= Greco-Bactrian Kingdom =

Hellenistic-era Greek kingdom (256–100 BCE)

Kingdom of Bactria Βασιλεία τῆς Βακτριανῆς Basileía tẽs Baktrianẽs
- 256 BC – c. 120 BC
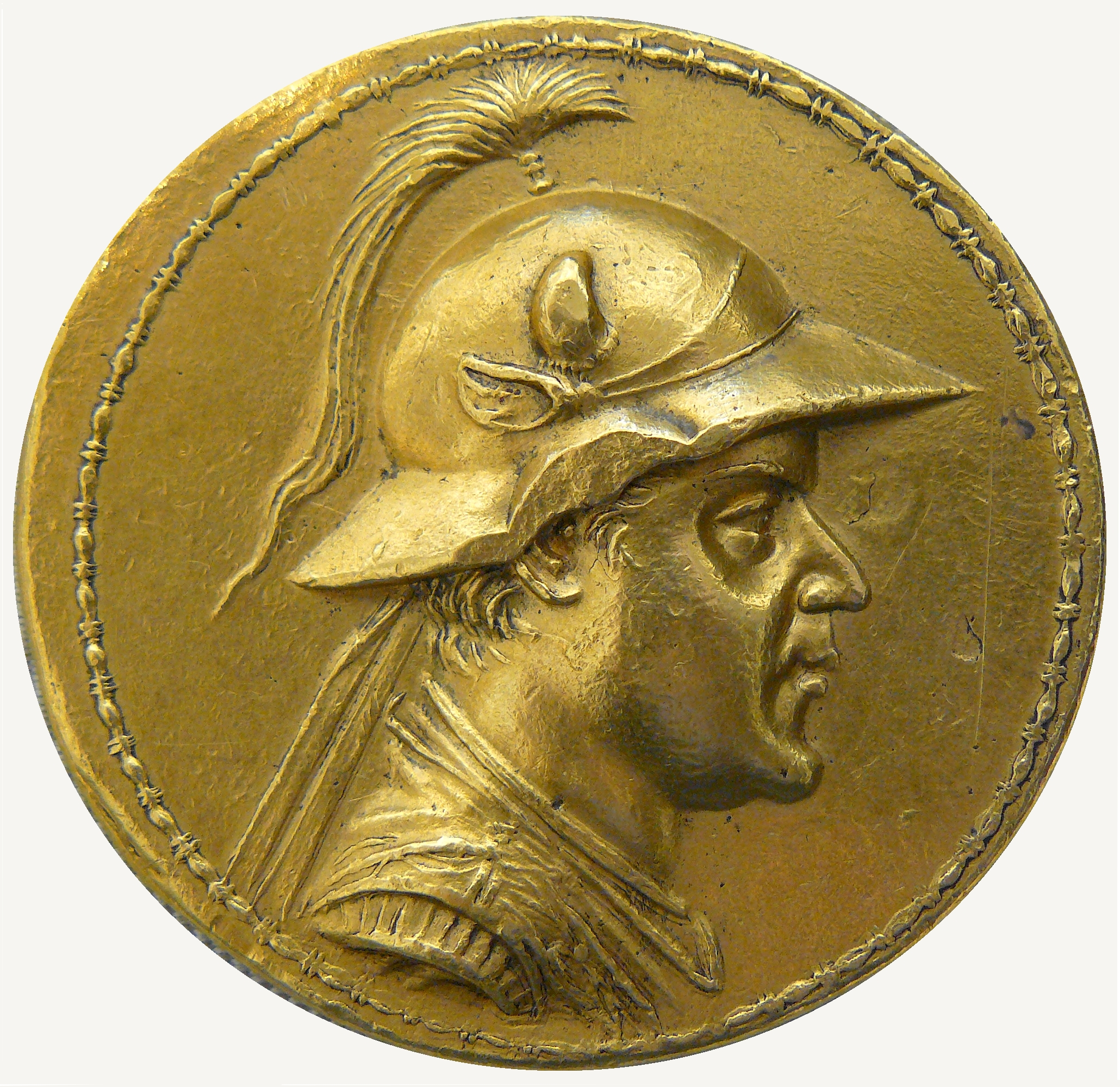
- Eucratides the Great wearing a crested Boeotian helmet, shown on his gold 20-stater, the largest gold coin ever minted in the ancient world, c. 2nd century BC.

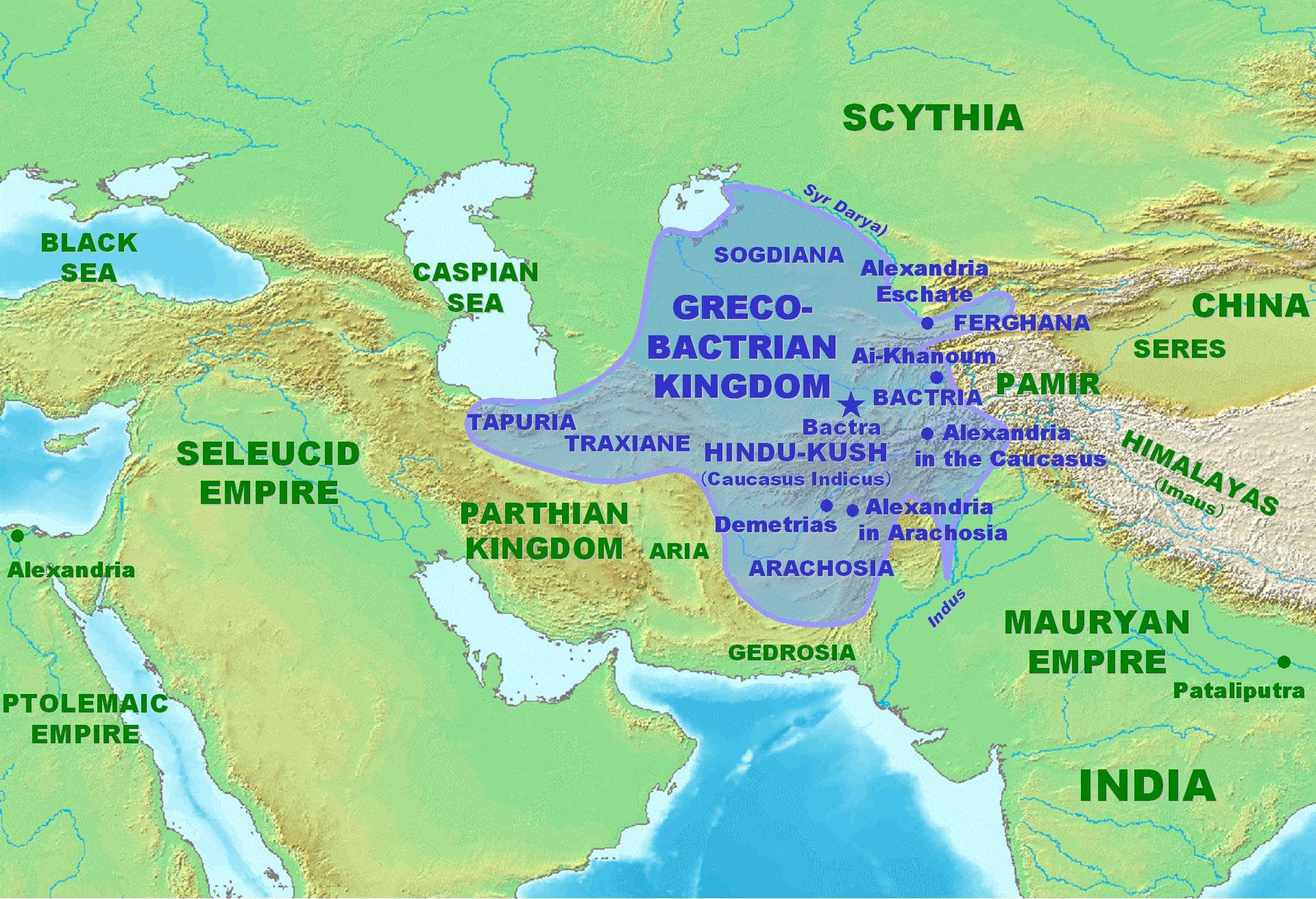
- Approximate maximum extent of the Greco-Bactrian Kingdom under the reign of Eucratides the Great, including the regions of Tapuria and Traxiane to the west, Sogdiana and Ferghana to the north, Bactria and Arachosia to the south.
- Capital: Bactra; Ai-Khanoum
- Common languages: Greek (official); Bactrian; Pali; Sanskrit; Aramaic; Sogdian
- Religion: Greek polytheism; Greco-Buddhism; Zoroastrianism; Hinduism
- Government: Monarchy
- Basileus
  - 256–235 BC: Diodotus I (first)
  - 200–180 BC: Demetrius I
  - 171–145 BC: Eucratides the Great
  - 117–100 BC: Heliocles I (last)
- Historical era: Hellenistic period
  - Established: 256 BC
  - Disestablished: c. 120 BC

Area
- 184 BC: 2,500,000 km^{2} (970,000 sq mi)
- Currency: Stater
Preceded by
Seleucid Empire
Succeeded by
Indo-Greek Kingdom
Parthian Empire
Kushan Empire

The Greco-Bactrian Kingdom (Greek: Βασιλεία τῆς Βακτριανῆς, romanized: Basileía tẽs Baktrianẽs, lit. 'Kingdom of Bactria'), officially the Kingdom of Bactria was a Greek kingdom during the Hellenistic period located in Central Asia and Afghanistan. The kingdom was founded by the Seleucid satrap Diodotus I Soter in about 256 BC, and continued to dominate Central Asia while ruled by the Euthydemid and Eucratid dynasties, until its fall around 120 BC. (Note: Some cities were still controlled by Greek kings such as Hermaeus Soter (90–70 BC) in what is today Kabul.) At its peak the kingdom consisted of present-day Afghanistan, Tajikistan, Uzbekistan and Turkmenistan, and for a short time, small parts of Kazakhstan, Pakistan and Iran. An extension further east, with military campaigns and settlements, may have reached the borders of the Qin State in China by about 230 BC.

A Greek population was already present in Bactria by the 5th century BC. Alexander the Great had conquered the region by 327 BC, founding many cities, most of them named Alexandria, and further settling Macedonians and other Greeks. After the death of Alexander, control of Bactria passed on to his general Seleucus I Nicator. The fertility and the prosperity of the region led to the creation of the Greco-Bactrian kingdom under Diodotus by the early 3rd century BC, as a successor state of the Seleucid Empire. The Bactrian Greeks grew increasingly more powerful and invaded north-western India between 190 and 180 BC under king Demetrius, the son of Euthydemus. This invasion led to the creation of the Indo-Greek Kingdom, which in turn was a successor to the Greco-Bactrian kingdom, and was subsequently ruled by the kings Pantaleon and Apollodotus I. Historical records indicate that many rich and prosperous cities were present in the kingdom, but only a few of them have been excavated, such as Ai-Khanoum and Bactra. The city of Ai-Khanoum, in north-eastern Afghanistan, had all the hallmarks of a true Hellenistic city with a Greek theater, gymnasium and some houses with colonnaded courtyards.

The kingdom reached its peak under Eucratides the Great, who seems to have seized power through a coup around 171 BC and established his own dynasty. Eucratides also invaded India and successfully fought against the Indo-Greek kings. However, soon the kingdom began to decline. The Parthians and nomadic tribes such as Sakas and Yuezhi became a major threat. Eucratides was killed by his own son in about 145 BC, which may have further destabilised the kingdom. Heliocles was the last Greek king to rule in Bactria.

Even after the fall of the Greco-Bactrian kingdom, their rich Hellenistic legacy lasted for many more centuries. The Yuezhi invaders settled in Bactria and became Hellenized. They subsequently founded the Kushan Empire around 30 AD, and adopted the Greek alphabet to write their language and added Greek deities to their pantheon. The Greco-Bactrian city of Ai-Khanoum was at the doorstep of India and was known for its sophistication and Hellenistic features. Greek art was spread by the Indo-Greeks; influencing Indian art, religion and culture, leading to a new style of syncretic art called Greco-Buddhist art.

== History ==
=== Origins ===
The Oxus Valley region was originally settled by nomadic Zoroastrian tribes, referred to generally as Scythian by classical Greek writers. Bactria is referenced multiple times in the Avesta. In Zaroastrian writings the region is associated with the Turanian people.

Bactria (known to the Greeks as Βακτριανή, i.e. Baktrianē) was inhabited by Greek settlers since the time of Darius I, when the majority of the population of Barca, in Cyrenaica, was deported to the region for refusing to surrender assassins. Greek influence increased under Xerxes I, after the descendants of Greek priests who had once lived near Didyma (western Asia Minor) were forcibly relocated in Bactria, and later on with other exiled Greeks, most of them prisoners of war. Greek communities and language were already common in the area by the time that Alexander the Great conquered Bactria in 328 BC.

Alexander the Great crossed the Hindu Kush in 329 BCE in pursuit of the Persian Satrap Bessus, entering the Oxus valley that same year. Following the execution of Bessus, Alexander began the process of pacification in Bactria and neighboring Sogdiana, depositing garrisons at Bactra, Maracanda, and Cyropolis. It was at this time that Alexander massacred the Greek community that had previously been settled in the region.

Settlement of newly established colonies along the Oxus and the Jaxartes was carried out by predominantly Greek mercenaries cut loose from the main body of Alexander's army due to injury, age, or questionable loyalty. 20,000 Greek soldiers were summoned from the Balkans to reinforce Alexander's army. This served to replace immense casualties suffered during a mass revolt in Bactria and Sogdiana, as well as to weaken a fledgling anti-Macedonian uprising back in Greece.

In 326 BCE the Greek colonists staged a rebellion and attempted to march home to Greece following rumors of Alexander's death. A Greek named Athenodorus declared himself king of Bactria before confirmations of Alexander's survival caused the rebellion to melt away.

=== Independence and Diodotid dynasty ===
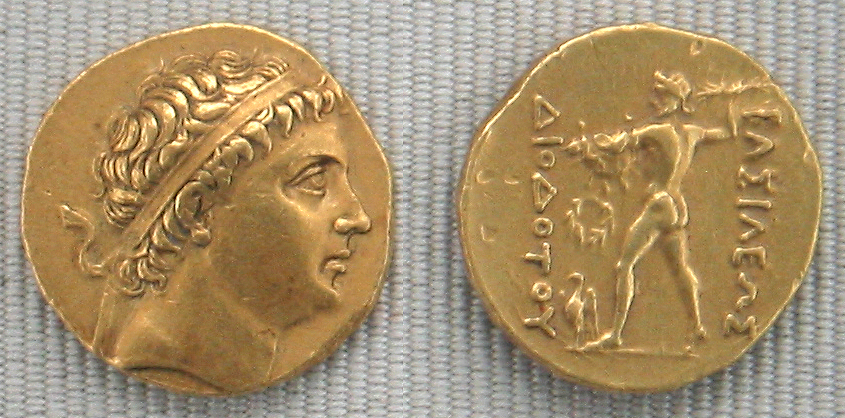
Gold coin of Diodotus c. 245 BC. The reverse shows Zeus standing, holding aegis and thunderbolt. The Greek inscription reads: ΒΑΣΙΛΕΩΣ ΔΙΟΔΟΤΟΥ, Basileōs Diodotou – "(of) King Diodotus".

Diodotus, the satrap of Bactria (and probably the surrounding provinces) founded the Greco-Bactrian Kingdom when he seceded from the Seleucid Empire around 250 BC and became Basileus, or king Diodotus I of Bactria. The preserved ancient sources (see below) are somewhat contradictory, and the exact date of Bactrian independence has not been settled. Somewhat simplified, there is a high chronology (c. 255 BC) and a low chronology (c. 246 BC) for Diodotus' secession. The high chronology has the advantage of explaining why the Seleucid king Antiochus II issued very few coins in Bactria, as Diodotus would have become independent there early in Antiochus' reign. On the other hand, the low chronology, from the mid-240s BC, has the advantage of connecting the secession of Diodotus I with the Third Syrian War, a catastrophic conflict for the Seleucid Empire.

Diodotus, the governor of the thousand cities of Bactria (Latin: Theodotus, mille urbium Bactrianarum praefectus), defected and proclaimed himself king; all the other people of the Orient followed his example and seceded from the Macedonians.

The new kingdom, highly urbanized and considered one of the richest of the Orient (opulentissimum illud mille urbium Bactrianum imperium "The extremely prosperous Bactrian empire of the thousand cities", according to the historian Justin), was to further grow in power and engage in territorial expansion to the east and the west:

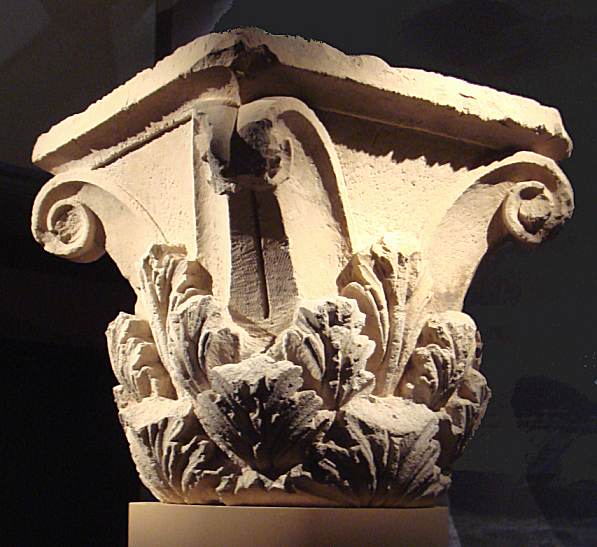
Corinthian capital, found at Ai-Khanoum, 2nd century BC

The Greeks who caused Bactria to revolt grew so powerful on account of the fertility of the country that they became masters, not only of Ariana, but also of India, as Apollodorus of Artemita says: and more tribes were subdued by them than by Alexander… Their cities were Bactra (also called Zariaspa, through which flows a river bearing the same name and emptying into the Oxus), and Darapsa, and several others. Among these was Eucratidia, which was named after its ruler.

In 247 BC, the Ptolemaic empire (the Greek rulers of Egypt following the death of Alexander the Great) captured the Seleucid capital, Antioch. In the resulting power vacuum, Andragoras, the Seleucid satrap of Parthia, proclaimed independence from the Seleucids, declaring himself king. A decade later, he was defeated and killed by Arsaces of Parthia, leading to the rise of a Parthian Empire. This cut Bactria off from contact with the Greek world. Overland trade continued at a reduced rate, while sea trade between Greek Egypt and Bactria developed.

Diodotus was succeeded by his son Diodotus II, who allied himself with the Parthian Arsaces in his fight against Seleucus II:

Soon after, relieved by the death of Diodotus, Arsaces made peace and concluded an alliance with his son, also by the name of Diodotus; some time later he fought against Seleucos who came to punish the rebels, and he prevailed: the Parthians celebrated this day as the one that marked the beginning of their freedom.

=== Euthydemid dynasty and Seleucid invasion ===
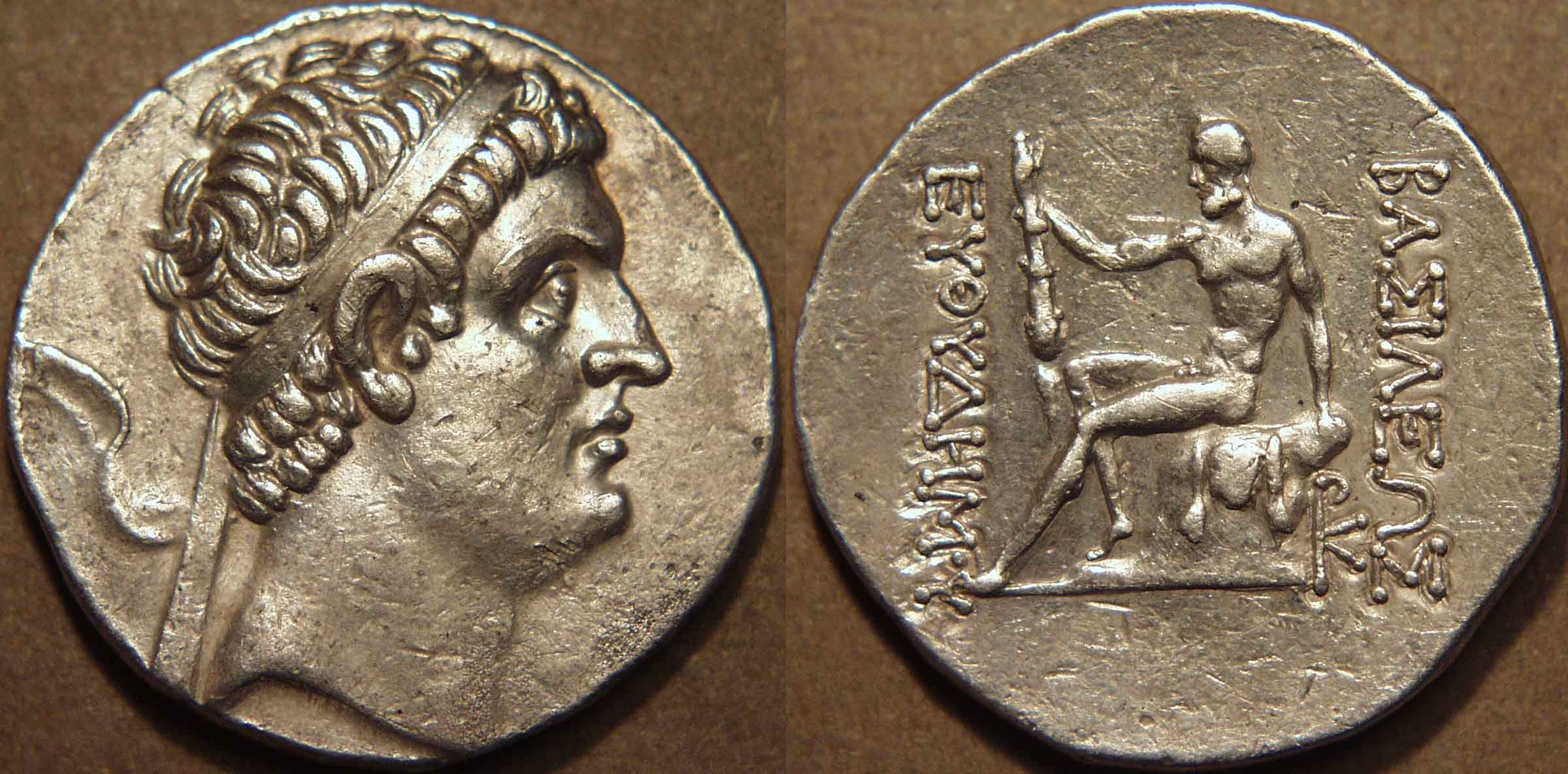
Coin depicting the Greco-Bactrian king Euthydemus, 230–200 BC. The reverse shows Heracles seated, holding club in right hand. The Greek inscription reads: ΒΑΣΙΛΕΩΣ ΕΥΘΥΔΗΜΟΥ, Basileōs Euthydēmou – "(of) King Euthydemus".

Euthydemus, an Ionian Greek from Magnesia according to Polybius, and possibly satrap of Sogdiana, overthrew the dynasty of Diodotus II around 230–220 BC and started his own dynasty. Euthydemus's control extended to Sogdiana, going beyond the city of Alexandria Eschate founded by Alexander the Great in Ferghana:

And they also held Sogdiana, situated above Bactriana towards the east between the Oxus River, which forms the boundary between the Bactrians and the Sogdians, and the Iaxartes River. And the Iaxartes forms also the boundary between the Sogdians and the nomads.

Euthydemus was attacked by the Seleucid ruler Antiochus III around 210 BC. Although he commanded 10,000 horsemen, Euthydemus initially lost a battle on the Arius and had to retreat. He then successfully resisted a three-year siege in the fortified city of Bactra, before Antiochus finally decided to recognize the new ruler, and to offer one of his daughters to Euthydemus's son Demetrius around 206 BC. Classical accounts also relate that Euthydemus negotiated peace with Antiochus III by suggesting that he deserved credit for overthrowing the original rebel Diodotus and that he was protecting Central Asia from nomadic invasions thanks to his defensive efforts:

... for if he did not yield to this demand, neither of them would be safe: Seeing that great hordes of Nomads were close at hand, who were a danger to both; and that if they admitted them into the country, it would certainly be utterly barbarised.

In an inscription found in the Kulob area of Tajikistan, in eastern Greco-Bactria, and dated to 200–195 BC, a Greek by the name of Heliodotus, dedicating a fire altar to Hestia, mentions Euthydemus as the greatest of all kings, and his son Demetrius I as "Demetrios Kallinikos", meaning "Demetrius the Glorious Conqueror":

τόνδε σοι βωμὸν θυώδη, πρέσβα κυδίστη θεῶν Ἑστία, Διὸς κ(α)τ᾽ ἄλσος καλλίδενδρον ἔκτισεν καὶ κλυταῖς ἤσκησε λοιβαῖς ἐμπύροις Ἡλιόδοτος ὄφρα τὸμ πάντων μέγιστον Εὐθύδημον βασιλέων τοῦ τε παῖδα καλλίνικον ἐκπρεπῆ Δημήτριον πρευμενὴς σώιζηις ἐκηδεῖ(ς) σὺν τύχαι θεόφρον[ι].

tónde soi bōmòn thuṓdē, présba kydístē theôn Hestía, Diòs kat' álsos kallídendron éktisen kaì klytaîs ḗskēse loibaîs empýrois Hēliódotos óphra tòm pántōn mégiston Euthýdēmon basiléōn toû te paîda kallínikon ekprepê Dēmḗtrion preumenḕs sṓizēis ekēdeî(s) sỳn Týchai theόphron(i).

"Heliodotus dedicated this fragrant altar for Hestia, venerable goddess, illustrious amongst all, in the grove of Zeus, with beautiful trees; he made libations and sacrifices so that the greatest of all kings Euthydemus, as well as his son, the glorious, victorious and remarkable Demetrius, be preserved of all pains, with the help of Tyche with divine thoughts."

Following the departure of the Seleucid army, the Bactrian kingdom seems to have expanded. In the west, areas in north-eastern Iran may have been absorbed, possibly as far as into Parthia, whose ruler had been defeated by Antiochus the Great. These territories possibly are identical with the Bactrian satrapies of Tapuria and Traxiane.

=== Expansion into the Indian subcontinent (around 180 BC) ===
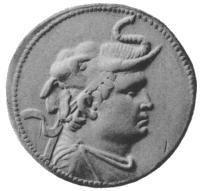
Silver coin of king Demetrius I of Bactria (reigned c. 200–180 BC), wearing an elephant scalp, symbol of his conquests in northwest Indian subcontinent.

Demetrius, the son of Euthydemus, started an invasion of the subcontinent before 180 BC, and a few years after the Mauryan Empire had been overthrown by the Shunga dynasty. Historians differ on the motivations behind the invasion. Some historians suggest that the invasion of the subcontinent was intended to show their support for the Mauryan Empire, and to protect the Buddhist faith from the religious persecutions of the Shungas as alleged by Buddhist scriptures (Tarn). Other historians have argued however that the accounts of these persecutions have been exaggerated (Thapar, Lamotte).

Demetrius may have been as far as the imperial capital Pataliputra in today's eastern India (today Patna). However, these campaigns are typically attributed to Menander. His conquests were mentioned along with that of Menander by the historian Strabo, as having "subdued more tribes than Alexander." The invasion was completed by 175 BC. This established in the northwestern Indian Subcontinent what is called the Indo-Greek Kingdom, which lasted for almost two centuries until around 10 AD. The Buddhist faith flourished under the Indo-Greek kings, especially Menander who was arguably the most powerful of them all. It was also a period of great cultural syncretism, exemplified by the development of Greco-Buddhism in the region of Gandhara.

=== Eucratides the Great ===
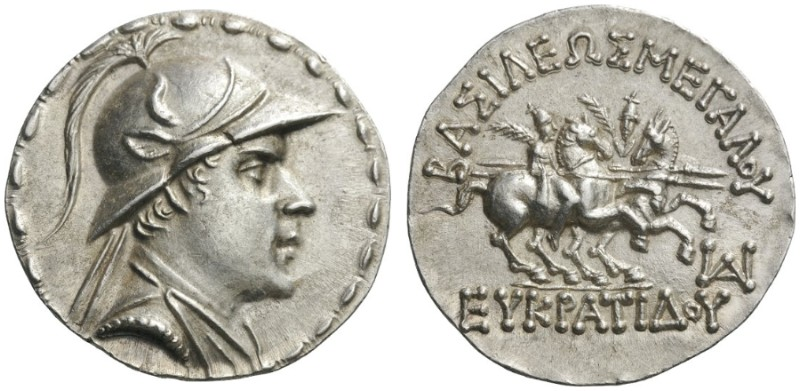
Silver tetradrachm of King Eucratides I, reigned c. 171–145 BC. The obverse shows the King wearing a crested helmet with a diadem. The reverse shows the Dioscuri on horseback, with the Greek inscription: ΒΑΣΙΛΕΩΣ ΜΕΓΑΛΟΥ ΕΥΚΡΑΤΙΔΟΥ, Basileōs Megalou Eukratidou – "(of) Great King Eucratides".

Back in Bactria, Eucratides I, either a general of Demetrius or an ally of the Seleucids, managed to overthrow the Euthydemid dynasty and establish his own rule, the short-lived Eucratid dynasty, around 170 BC, probably dethroning Antimachus I and Antimachus II. The Indian branch of the Euthydemids tried to strike back. An Indian king called Demetrius (very likely Demetrius II) is said to have returned to Bactria with 60,000 men to oust the usurper, but he apparently was defeated and killed in the encounter:

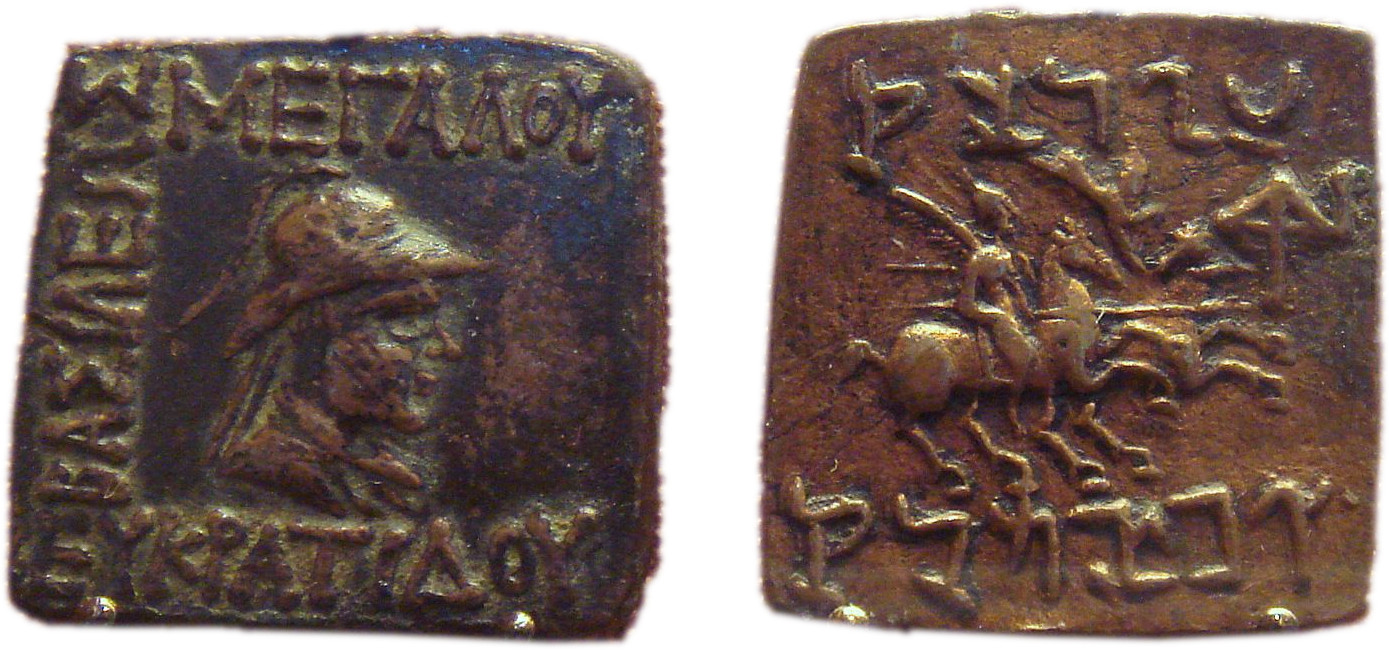
Bilingual coin of Eucratides I in the Indian standard, on the obverse Greek inscription reads: ΒΑΣΙΛΕΩΣ ΜΕΓΑΛΟΥ ΕΥΚΡΑΤΙΔΟΥ, Basileōs Megalou Eukratidou – "(of) Great King Eucratides"; on the reverse Pali language in Kharoshthi legend reads: Maharajasa Evukratidasa, "of Great King Eucratides".

Eucratides led many wars with great courage, and, while weakened by them, was put under siege by Demetrius, king of the Indians. He made numerous sorties, and managed to vanquish 60,000 enemies with 300 soldiers, and thus liberated after four months, he put India under his rule.

Eucratides campaigned extensively in present-day northwestern India, and ruled a vast territory, as indicated by his minting of coins in many Indian mints, possibly as far as the Jhelum River in Punjab. In the end, however, he was repulsed by the Indo-Greek king Menander I, who managed to create a huge unified territory.

In a rather confused account, Justin explains that Eucratides was killed on the field by "his son and joint king", who would be his own son, either Eucratides II or Heliocles I (although there are speculations that it could have been his enemy's son Demetrius II). The son drove over Eucratides' bloodied body with his chariot and left him dismembered without a sepulcher:

As Eucratides returned from India, he was killed on the way back by his son, whom he had associated to his rule, and who, without hiding his parricide, as if he didn't kill a father but an enemy, ran with his chariot over the blood of his father, and ordered the corpse to be left without a sepulture.

=== Defeats by Parthia ===
During or after his Indian campaigns, Eucratides was attacked and defeated by the Parthian king Mithridates I, possibly in alliance with partisans of the Euthydemids:

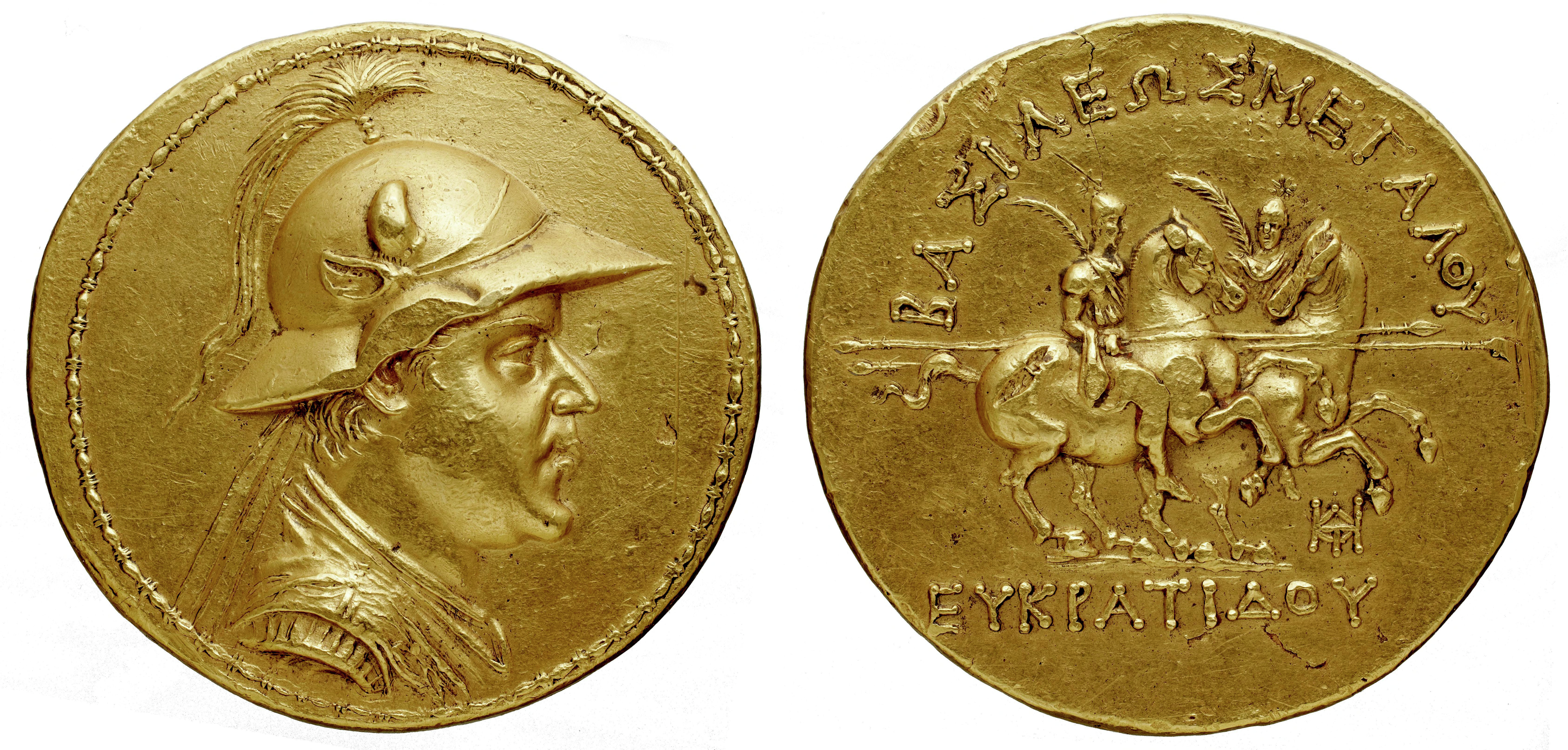
Gold 20-stater of Eucratides I, the largest gold coin of Antiquity. The coin weighs 169.2 grams, and has a diameter of 58 millimeters. The reverse shows the Dioscuri on horseback.

The Bactrians, involved in various wars, lost not only their rule but also their freedom, as, exhausted by their wars against the Sogdians, the Arachotes, the Dranges, the Arians and the Indians, they were finally crushed, as if drawn of all their blood, by an enemy weaker than them, the Parthians.

Following his victory, Mithridates I gained Bactria's territory west of the Arius, the regions of Tapuria and Traxiane: "The satrapy Turiva and that of Aspionus were taken away from Eucratides by the Parthians."

In the year 141 BC, the Greco-Bactrians seem to have entered in an alliance with the Seleucid king Demetrius II to fight again against Parthia:

The people of the Orient welcomed his (Demetrius II's) arrival, partly because of the cruelty of the Arsacid king of the Parthians, partly because, used to the rule of the Macedonians, they disliked the arrogance of this new people. Thus, Demetrius, supported by the Persians, Elymes and Bactrians, routed the Parthians in numerous battles. At the end, deceived by a false peace treaty, he was taken prisoner.

The 5th-century historian Orosius reports that Mithridates I managed to occupy territory between the Indus and the Hydaspes towards the end of his reign (c. 138 BC, before his kingdom was weakened by his death in 136 BC). (Note: Mentioned in "Hellenism in ancient India", Banerjee, p 140, to be taken carefully since Orosius is often rather unreliable in his accounts.)

Heliocles I ended up ruling what territory remained. The defeat, both in the west and the east, may have left Bactria very weakened and open to nomadic invasions.

=== Nomadic invasions and fall ===
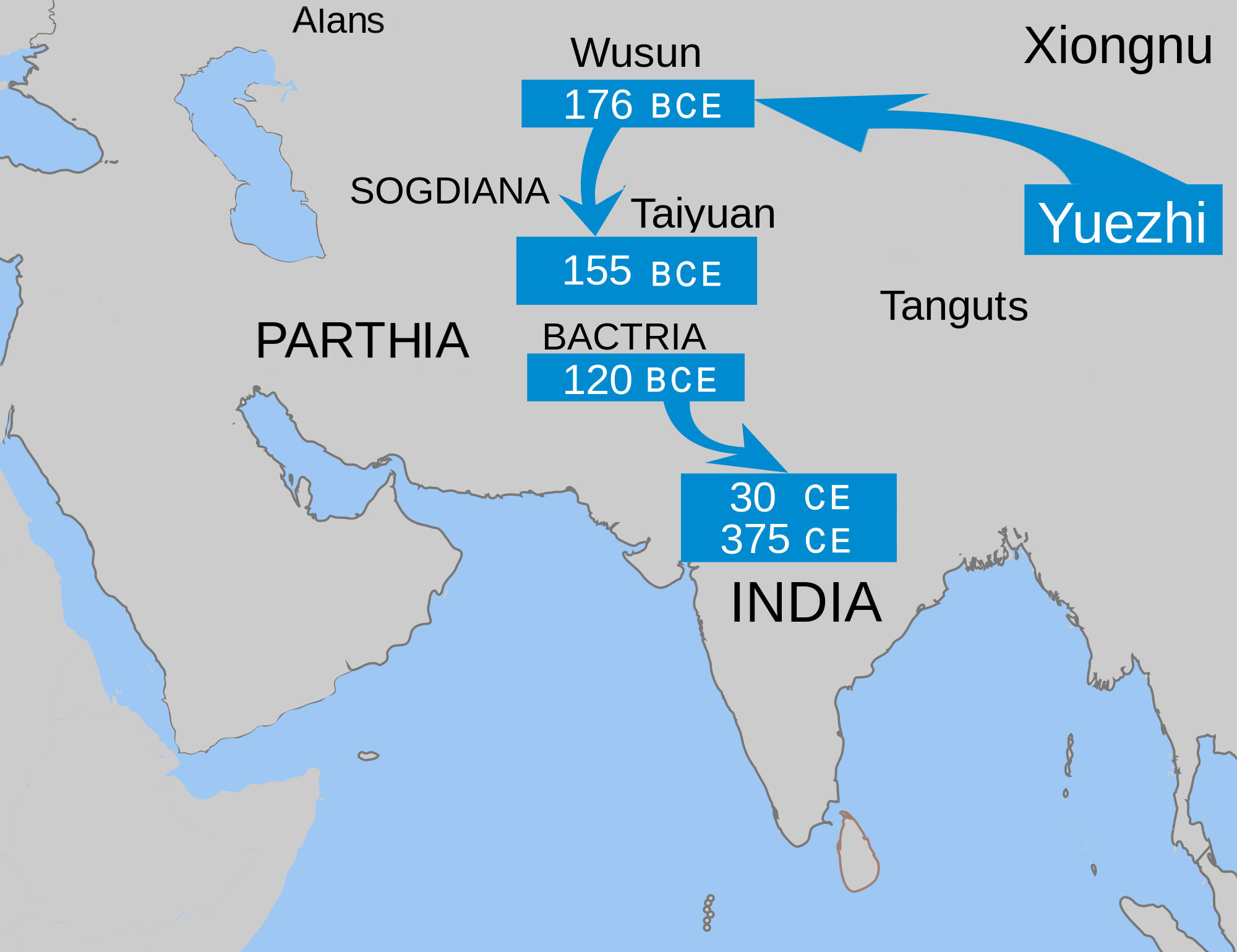
The migrations of the Yuezhi through Central Asia, from around 176 BC–AD 30

A nomadic steppe people called the Yuezhi inhabited a region thousands of miles to the east of Bactria on the edges of the Han Empire called the Hexi Corridor. Shortly before 176 BC, the Xiongnu invaded the Hexi Corridor, forcing the Yuezhi to flee the region. In 162 BC the Yuezhi were driven west to the Ili River valley by the Xiongnu. In 132 they were driven out of the Ili valley by the Wusun. The surviving Yuezhi migrated again south towards the territory just north of the Oxus River where they encountered and expelled a nomadic steppe nation called Sakastan.

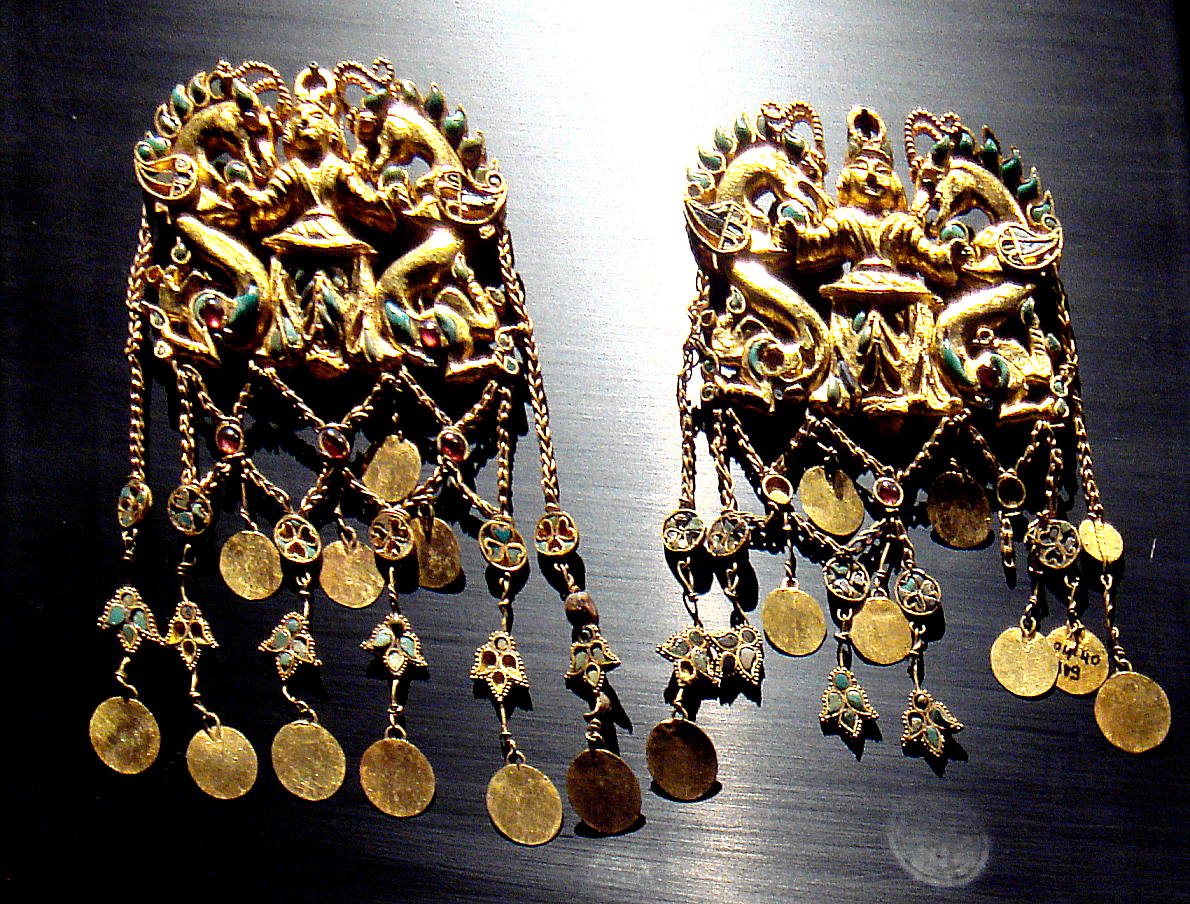
Gold artefacts of the Scythians in Bactria, at the site of Tillia tepe

Around 140 BC, eastern Scythians (the Saka, or Sacaraucae of Greek sources), apparently being pushed forward by the southward migration of the Yuezhi started to invade various parts of Parthia and Bactria. Their invasion of Parthia is well documented: they attacked in the direction of the cities of Merv, Hecatompolis and Ecbatana. They managed to defeat and kill the Parthian king Phraates II, son of Mithridates I, routing the Greek mercenary troops under his command (troops he had acquired during his victory over Antiochus VII). Again in 123 BC, Phraates's successor, his uncle Artabanus I, was killed by the Scythians.

When the Han Chinese diplomat Zhang Qian visited the Yuezhi around 126 BC, trying to obtain their alliance to fight the Xiongnu, he explained that the Yuezhi were settled north of the Oxus but also held under their sway the territory south of Oxus, which makes up the remainder of Bactria.

According to Zhang Qian, the Yuezhi represented a considerable force of between 100,000 and 200,000 mounted archer warriors, (Note: "They are a nation of nomads, moving from place to place with their herds, and their customs are like those of the Xiongnu. They have some 100,000 or 200,000 archer warriors ... The Yuezhi originally lived in the area between the Qilian or Heavenly mountains and Dunhuang, but after they were defeated by the Xiongnu they moved far away to the west, beyond Dayuan, where they attacked and conquered the people of Daxia (Bactria) and set up the court of their king on the northern bank of the Gui (Oxus) river".) with customs identical to those of the Xiongnu, which would probably have easily defeated Greco-Bactrian forces (in 208 BC when the Greco-Bactrian king Euthydemus I confronted the invasion of the Seleucid king Antiochus III the Great, he commanded 10,000 horsemen). Zhang Qian actually visited Bactria (named Daxia in Chinese) in 126 BC, and portrays a country which was totally demoralized and whose political system had vanished, although its urban infrastructure remained:

Daxia (Bactria) is located over 2,000 li southwest of Dayuan, south of the Gui (Oxus) river. Its people cultivate the land and have cities and houses. Their customs are like those of Dayuan. It has no great ruler but only a number of petty chiefs ruling the various cities. The people are poor in the use of arms and afraid of battle, but they are clever at commerce. After the Great Yuezhi moved west and attacked Daxia, the entire country came under their sway. The population of the country is large, numbering some 1,000,000 or more persons. The capital is called the city of Lanshi (Bactra) and has a market where all sorts of goods are bought and sold. (Records of the Great Historian by Sima Qian, quoting Zhang Qian, translation by Burton Watson)

The Yuezhi further expanded southward into Bactria around 120 BC, apparently further pushed out by invasions from the northern Wusun. It seems they also pushed Scythian tribes before them, which continued to India, where they came to be identified as Indo-Scythians.

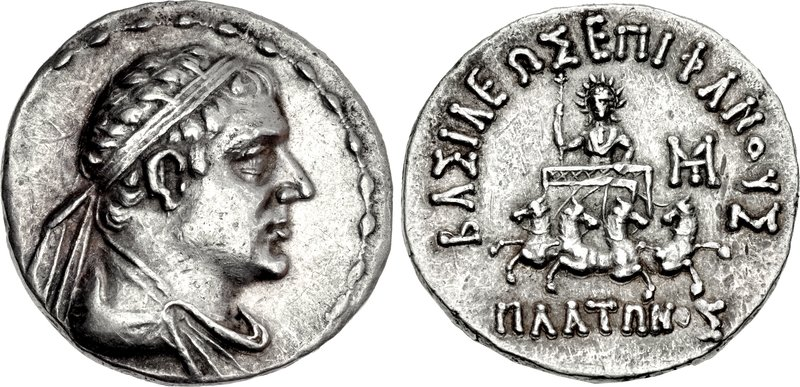
Silver coin of Plato of Bactria, wearing a diadem. The reverse shows Helios on his chariot facing forward. Greek legend reads: ΒΑΣΙΛΕΩΣ ΕΠΙΦΑΝΟΥΣ ΠΛΑΤΩΝΟΣ, Basileōs Epiphanous Platōnos – "(of) King Plato the God-Manifest."

This invasion of Bactria is also described in western Classical sources from the 1st century BC:

The best known tribes are those who deprived the Greeks of Bactriana, the Asii, Pasiani, Tochari, and Sacarauli, who came from the country on the other side of the Jaxartes, opposite the Sacae and Sogdiani.

Around that time the king Heliocles abandoned Bactria and moved his capital to the Kabul valley, from where he ruled his Indian holdings. Apparently there were two other Greco-Bactrian kings preceding Heliocles in the same region and from the same dynasty, named Eucratides II and Plato Epiphanes, the latter probably being a brother of Eucratides I. Since Heliocles left the Bactrian territory, he is technically the last Greco-Bactrian king, although several of his descendants, moving beyond the Hindu Kush, would form the western part of the Indo-Greek kingdom. The last of these "western" Indo-Greek kings, Hermaeus, would rule until around 70 BC, when the Yuezhi again invaded his territory in the Paropamisadae (while the "eastern" Indo-Greek kings would continue to rule until around AD 10 in the area of the Punjab region).

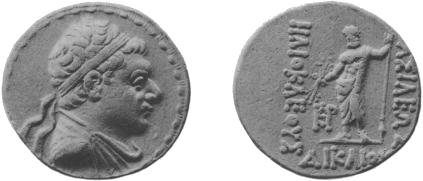
Silver coin of Heliocles (r. 150–125 BC), the last Greco-Bactrian king. The reverse shows Zeus holding thunderbolt and sceptre. Greek legend reads: ΒΑΣΙΛΕΩΣ ΔΙΚΑΙΟΥ ΗΛΙΟΚΛΕΟΥΣ, Basileōs Dikaiou Hēliokleous – "(of) King Heliocles the Just".

Overall, the Yuezhi remained in Bactria for more than a century. They became Hellenized to some degree, as suggested by their adoption of the Greek alphabet to write their later Iranian court language, and by numerous remaining coins, minted in the style of the Greco-Bactrian kings, with the text in Greek.

There is evidence for the persistence of Greek populations in Bactria after the collapse of the Greco-Bactrian kingdom. For example, an obol of a previously unknown ruler called Antigonus has been found and it seems he ruled after the kingdom's collapse, as evidenced by the use of a lunate sigma and the lower art quality of the coin, perhaps dating from the end of the 1st century BC. Antigonus might have briefly won a battle against the Yuezhi or the Saka before he was overrun himself.

Around 12 BC the Yuezhi then moved further to northern India where they established the Kushan Empire.

== Army ==
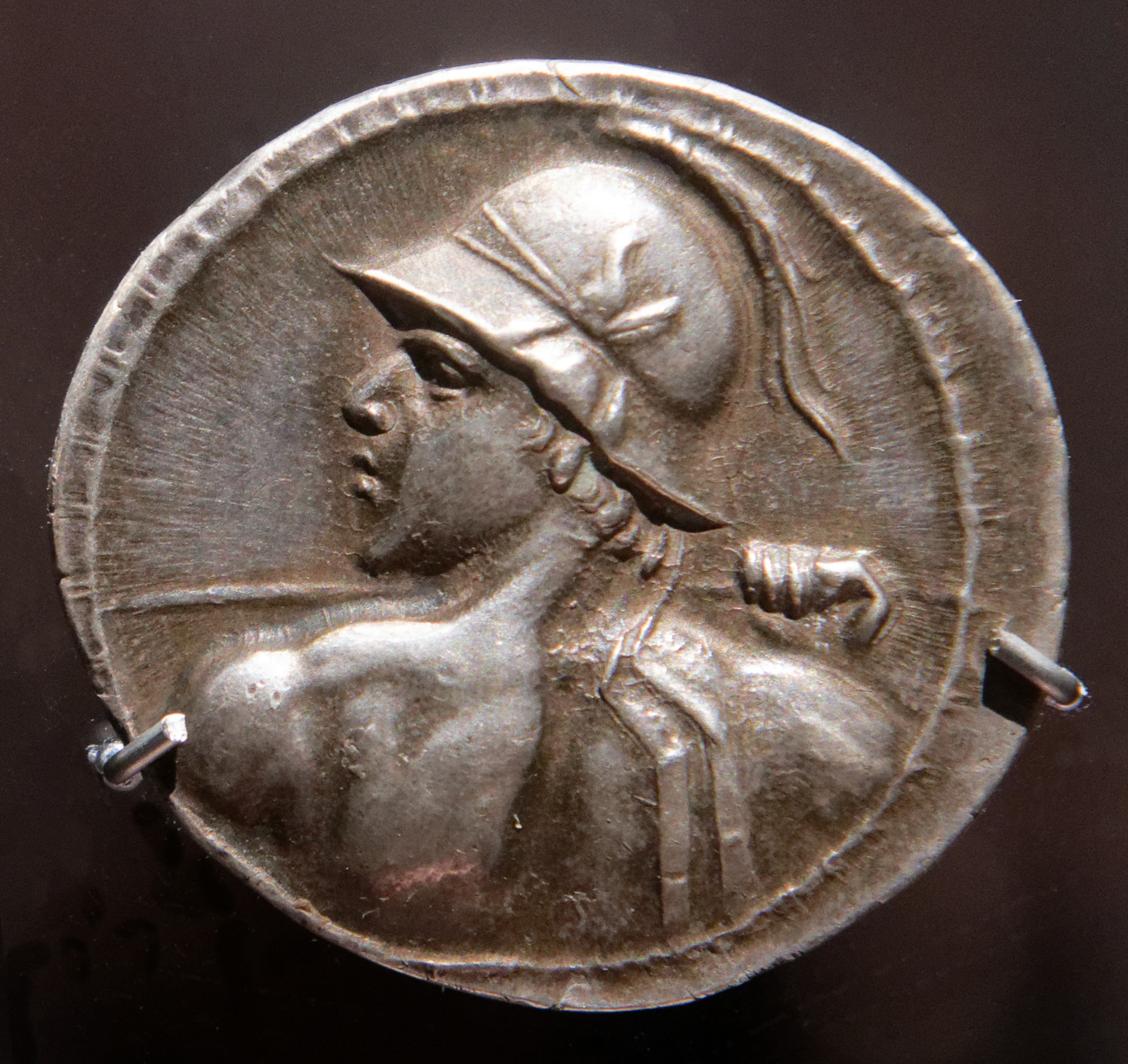
Coin showing Eucratides I as a warrior wearing a crested helmet adorned with bull's horn and ear. He also wears a diadem underneath, while holding a spear in his right hand; obverse.

Before the Greek conquest, the armies of Bactria were overwhelmingly composed of cavalry and were well known as effective soldiers, making up large portions of the Achaemenid cavalry contingents. 2,000 Bactrian horsemen fought at the Granicus against Alexander and 9,000 at the Battle of Gaugamela on the left flank of Darius' army. Herodotus also mentions the widespread use of chariots among the Bactrians. After Alexander's conquest of Bactria, Bactrian cavalry units served in his army during the invasion of India and after the Indian campaign, Alexander enlarged his elite companion cavalry by adding Bactrians, Sogdians and other east Iranian cavalrymen. Both Aeschylus (The Persians, v. 318) and Curtius mention that Bactria was able to field a force of 30,000 horse. Most of these horsemen were lightly armed, using bows and javelins before closing with sword and spear. Herodotus describes the Persian cavalry of Mardonius at the Battle of Plataea (which included Bactrians) as horse archers (hippotoxotai). Bactrian infantry is described by Herodotus as wearing caps in the Median style, short spears and reed Scythian style bows.

Alexander and Seleucus I both settled Macedonians and other Greeks in Bactria, and archeological finds in the region have also attested to a major Macedonian presence, as evidenced by the presence of symbols, style of coinage, and epigraphic names. Greek garrisons in the satrapy of Bactria were housed in fortresses called phrouria and at major cities. Military colonists were settled in the countryside and were each given an allotment of land called a kleros. These colonists numbered in the tens of thousands, and were trained in the fashion of the Macedonian army. A Greek army in Bactria during the anti-Macedonian revolt of 323 BC numbered 23,000.

The army of the Greco-Bactrian kingdom was then a multi-ethnic force with Greek colonists making up large portions of the infantry as pike phalanxes, supported by light infantry units of local Bactrians and mercenary javelin-wielding Thureophoroi. The cavalry arm was very large for a Hellenistic army and composed mostly of native Bactrian, Sogdian and other Indo-Iranian light horsemen. Polybius mentions 10,000 horse at the Battle of the Arius river in 208 BC. Greco-Bactrian armies also included units of heavily armored cataphracts and small elite units of companion cavalry. The third arm of the Greco-Bactrian army was the Indian war elephants, which are depicted in some coins with a tower (thorakion) or howdah housing men armed with bows and javelins. This force grew as the Greco-Bactrian kingdom expanded into India and was widely depicted in Greco-Bactrian coinage. Other units in the Bactrian military included mercenaries or levies from various surrounding peoples such as the Scythians, Dahae, Indians, and Parthians.

== Culture and legacy ==
=== Greek culture in Bactria ===
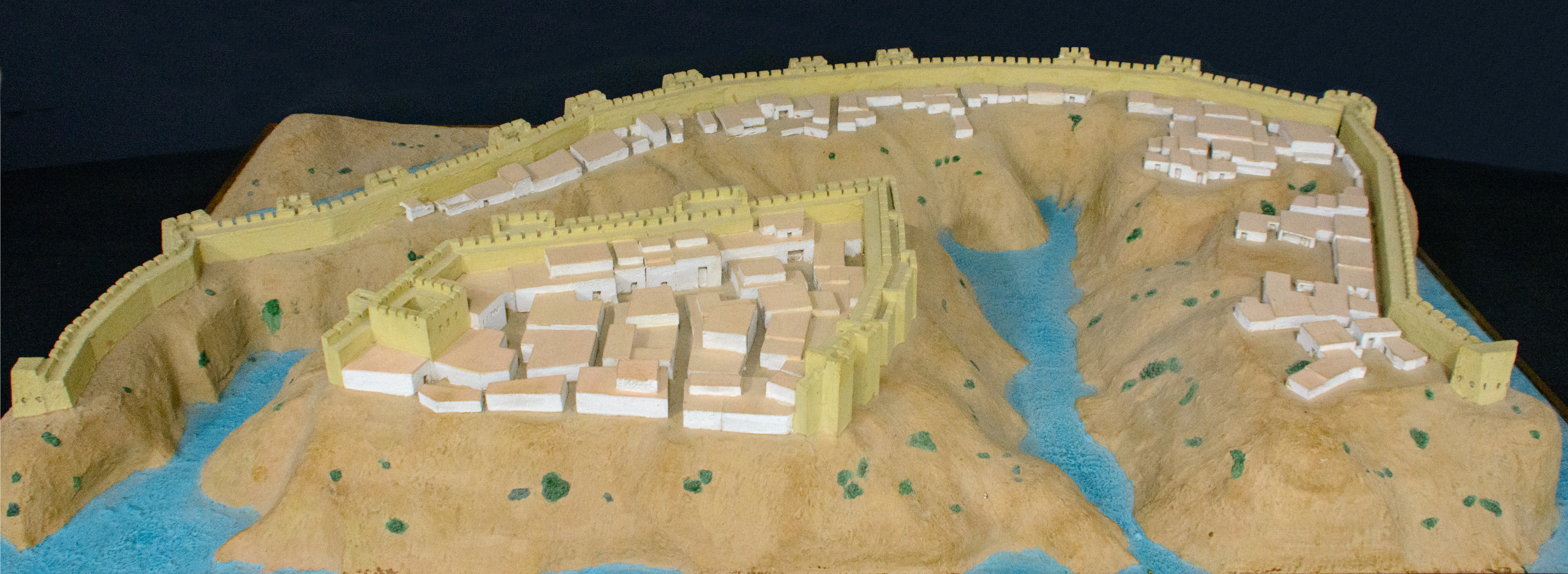
Reconstruction of Kampyr Tepe (Alexandria Oxiana)

Greeks first began settling the region long before Alexander conquered it. The Persian Empire had a policy of exiling rebelling Greek communities to that region long before it fell to Greek conquest. Therefore, it had a considerable Greek community that was expanded upon after Macedonian conquest.

The Greco-Bactrians were known for their high level of Hellenistic sophistication, and kept regular contact with both the Mediterranean and neighbouring India. They were on friendly terms with India and exchanged ambassadors.

Their cities, such as Ai-Khanoum in northeastern Afghanistan (probably Alexandria on the Oxus), and Bactra (modern Balkh) where Hellenistic remains have been found, demonstrate a sophisticated Hellenistic urban culture. This site gives a snapshot of Greco-Bactrian culture around 145 BC, as the city was burnt to the ground around that date during nomadic invasions and never re-settled. Ai-Khanoum "has all the hallmarks of a Hellenistic city, with a Greek theater, gymnasium and some Greek houses with colonnaded courtyards" (Boardman). Remains of Classical Corinthian columns were found in excavations of the site, as well as various sculptural fragments. In particular a huge foot fragment in excellent Hellenistic style was recovered, which is estimated to have belonged to a 5–6 meter tall statue.

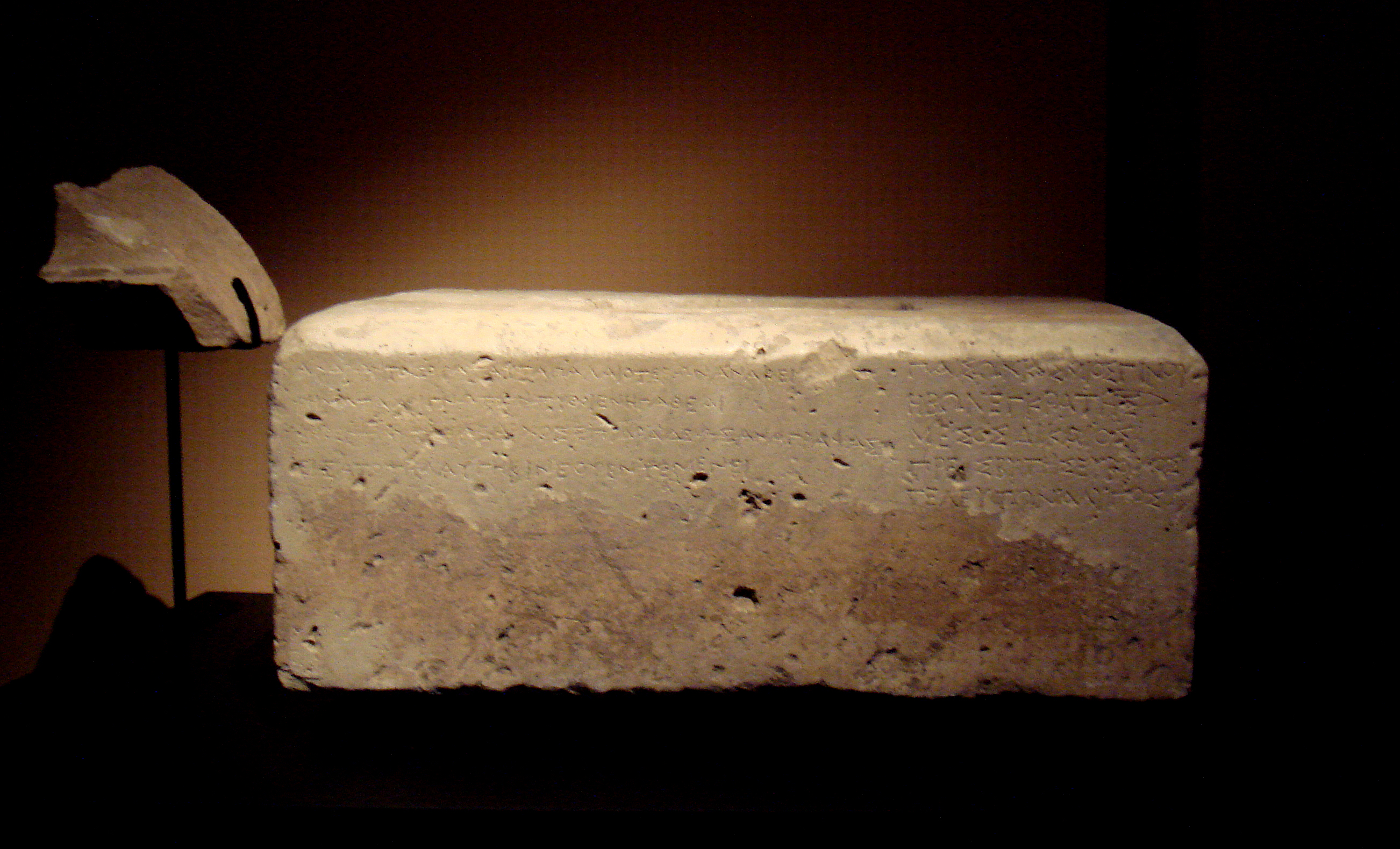
Stone block with the inscriptions of Kineas in Greek. Ai Khanoum.

One of the inscriptions in Greek found at Ai-Khanoum, the Herôon of Kineas, has been dated to 300–250 BC, and describes Delphic maxims:

παῖς ὢν κόσμιος γίνου
ἡβῶν ἐγκρατής
μέσος δίκαιος
πρεσβύτης εὔβουλος
τελευτῶν ἄλυπος

As children, learn good manners.
As young men, learn to control the passions.
In middle age, be just.
In old age, give good advice.
Then die, without regret.

Many other Greco-Bactrian cities have been identified, for example Alexandria Eschate (in modern Tajikistan), Eucratideia, and another city named Amphipolis. The latter being a previously unknown city which was mentioned on a Bactrian document and was clearly named after Amphipolis in ancient Macedonia. Excavated cities include Kampir Tepe in Uzbekistan, as well as Saksanokhur and Takht-i Sangin in Tajikistan (archaeological searches by a Soviet team under B.A. Litvinski), or in Dal'verzin Tepe.

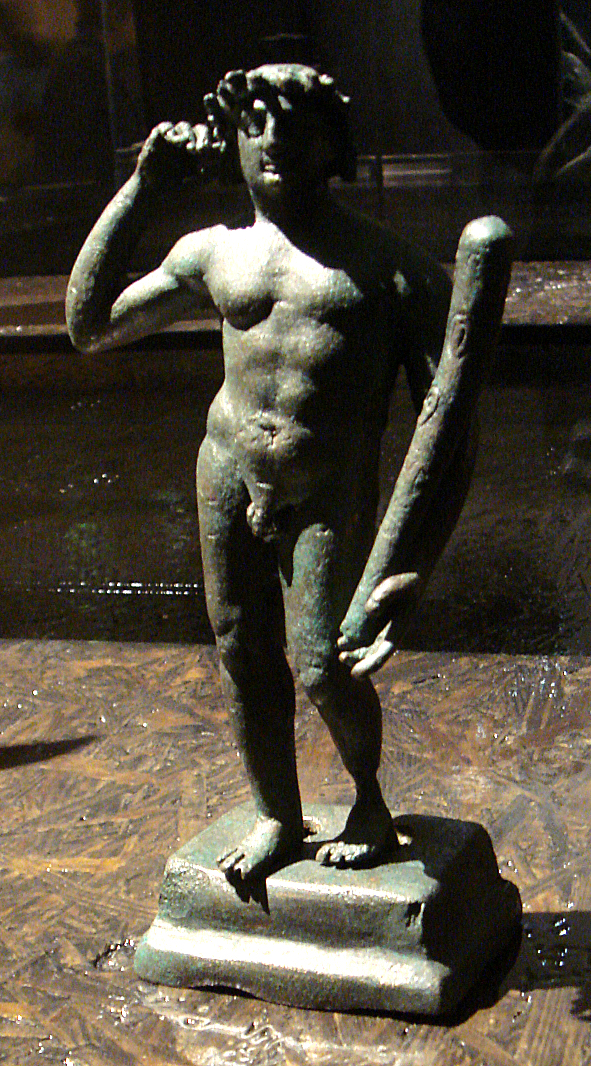
Bronze Heracles statuette. Ai Khanoum. 2nd century BC.

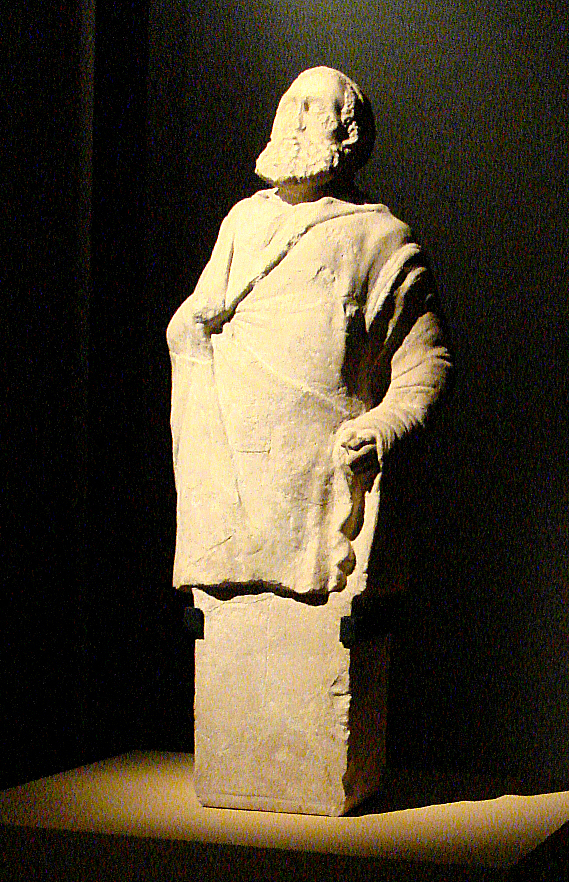
Sculpture of an old man, possibly a philosopher. Ai Khanoum, 2nd century BC.

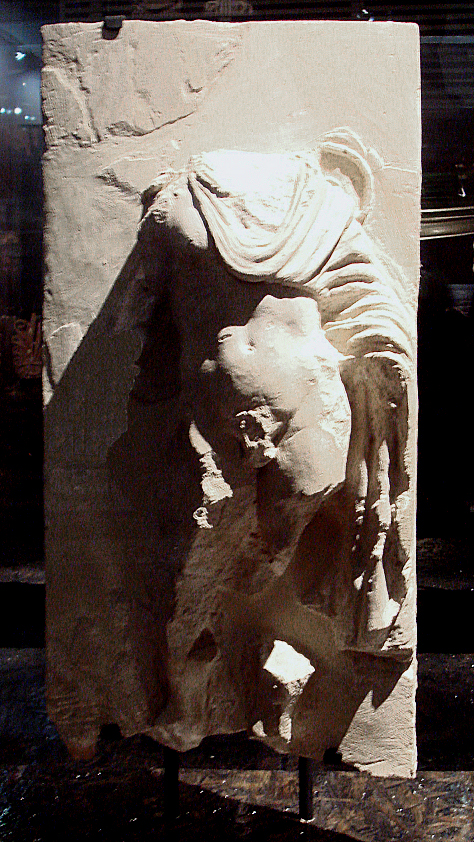
Frieze of a naked man wearing a chlamys. Ai Khanoum, 2nd century BC.

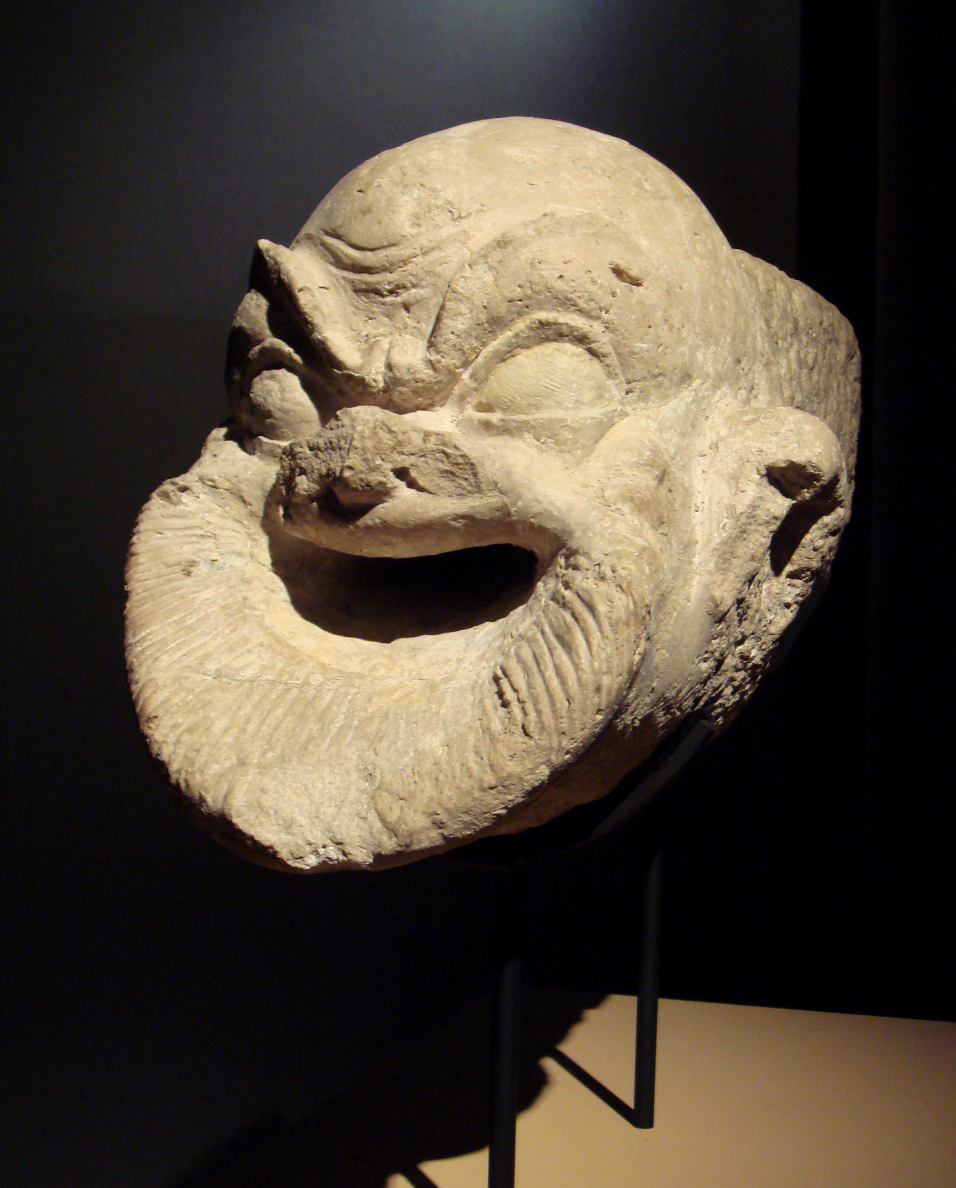
Gargoyle in the form of a Greek comic mask. Ai Khanoum, 2nd century BC.

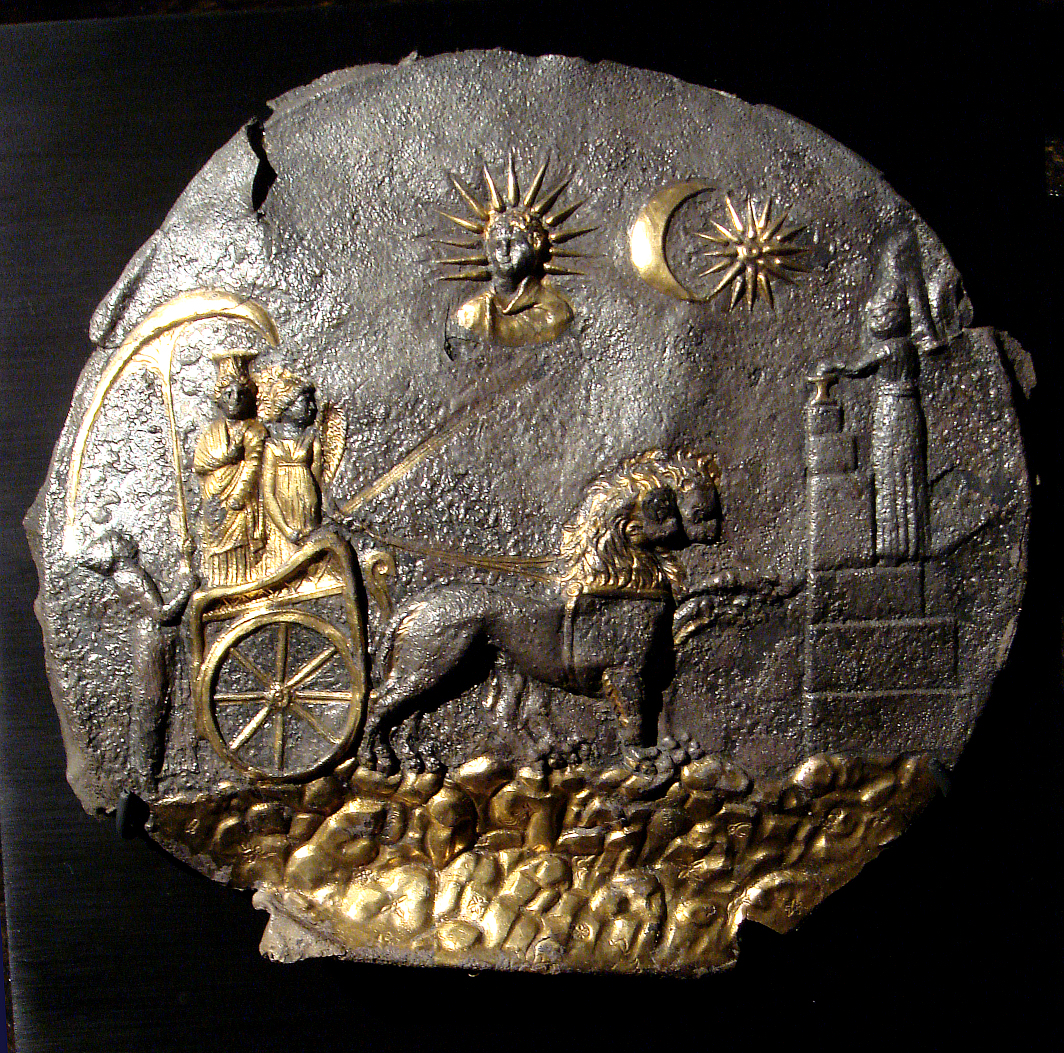
Plate depicting Cybele pulled by lions. Ai Khanoum.

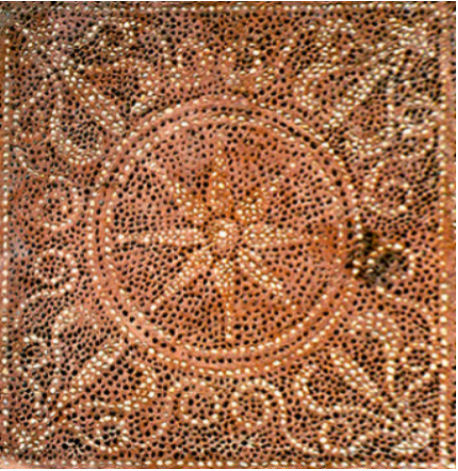
Mosaic depicting the Macedonian sun, Ai Khanoum, 2nd century BC.

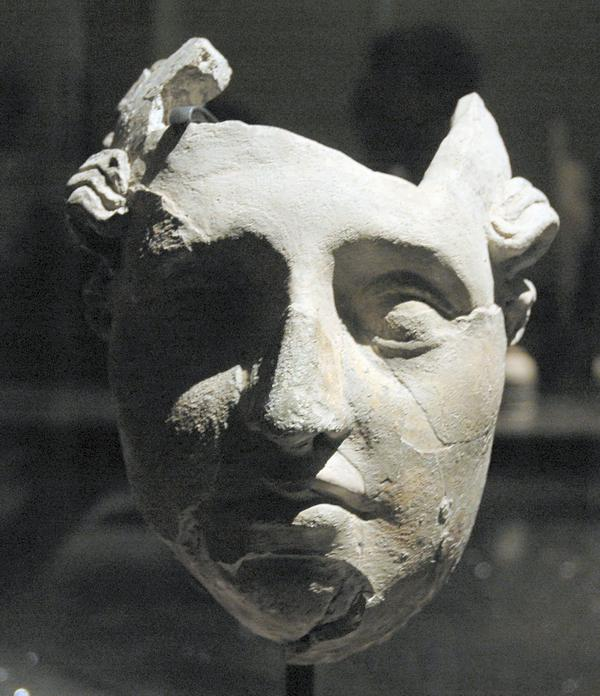
Portrait of a man, found in the administrative palace, 2nd century BC.

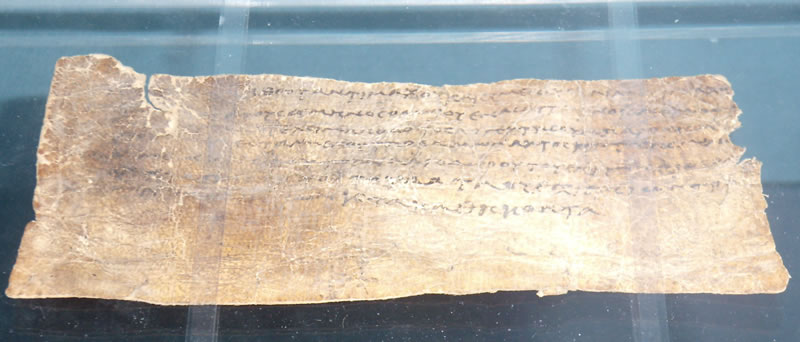
A Bactrian tax receipt written in Greek mentioning the kings Antimachus I, Eumenes and perhaps Antimachus II, 2nd century BC.

==== Takht-i Sangin ====
Takht-i Sangin (Tajik: "Throne of Stone") is an archaeological site located near the confluence of the Vakhsh and Panj rivers, the source of the Amu Darya, in southern Tajikistan. During the Hellenistic period it was a city of the Greco-Bactrian kingdom with a large temple dedicated to the Oxus (Vakhsh river), which remained in use in the following Kushan period, until the third century AD. The site may have been the source of the Oxus Treasure.

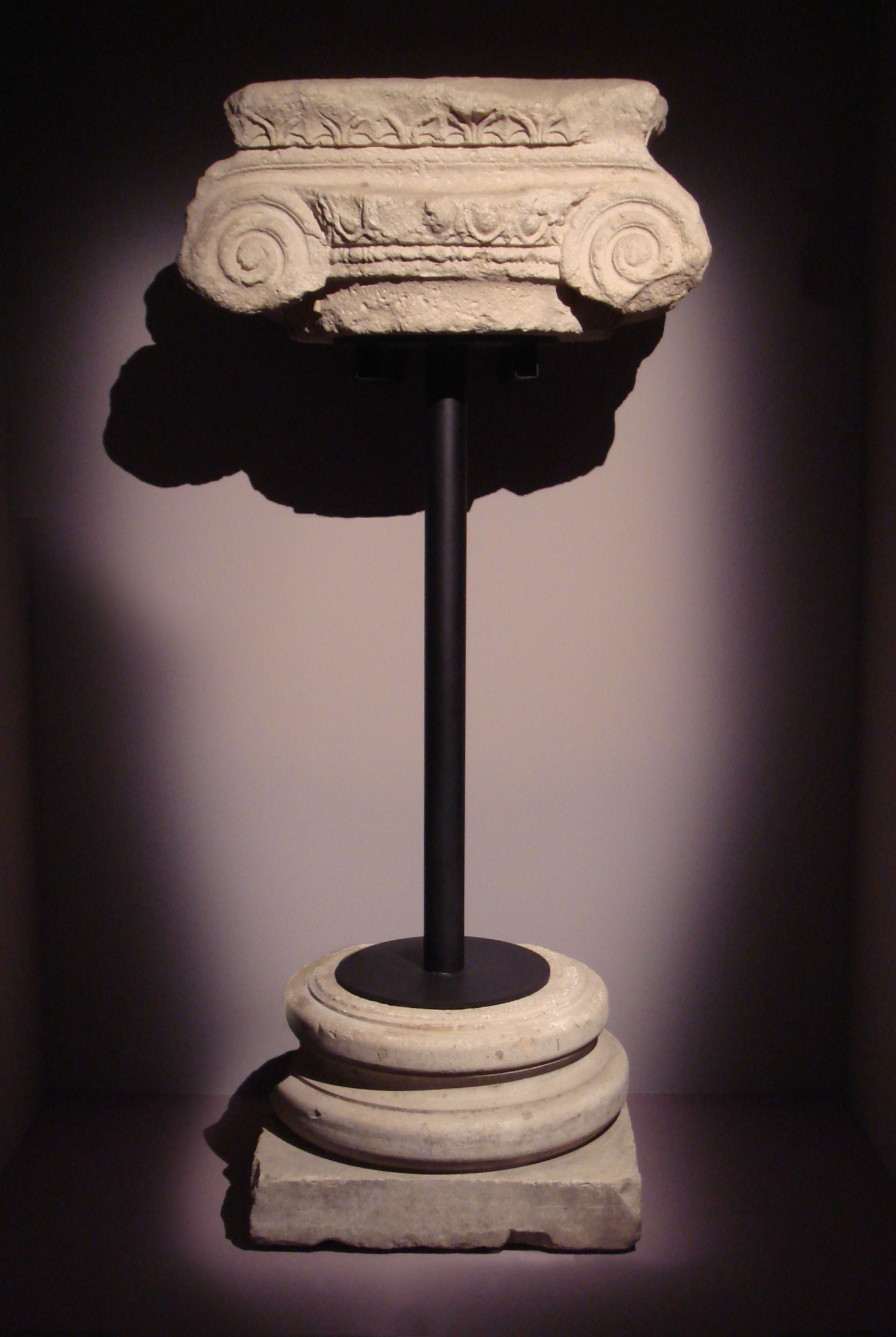
Ionic pillar, cella of the Temple of the Oxus, Takht-i Sangin, late 4th – early 3rd century BCE.

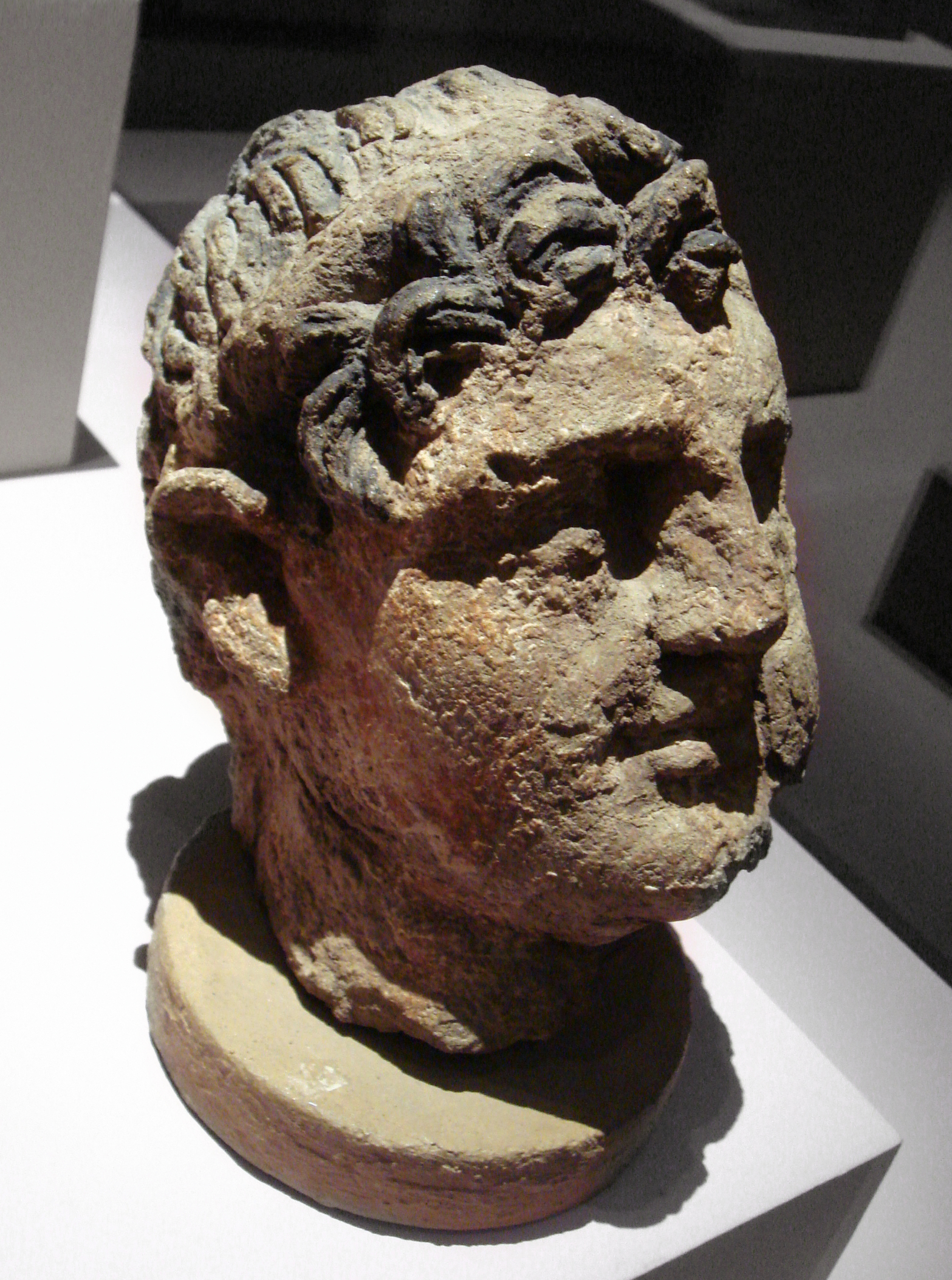
Head of a Greco-Bactrian ruler with diadem, Temple of the Oxus, Takht-i Sangin, 3rd–2nd century BCE. This could also be a portrait of Seleucus I.

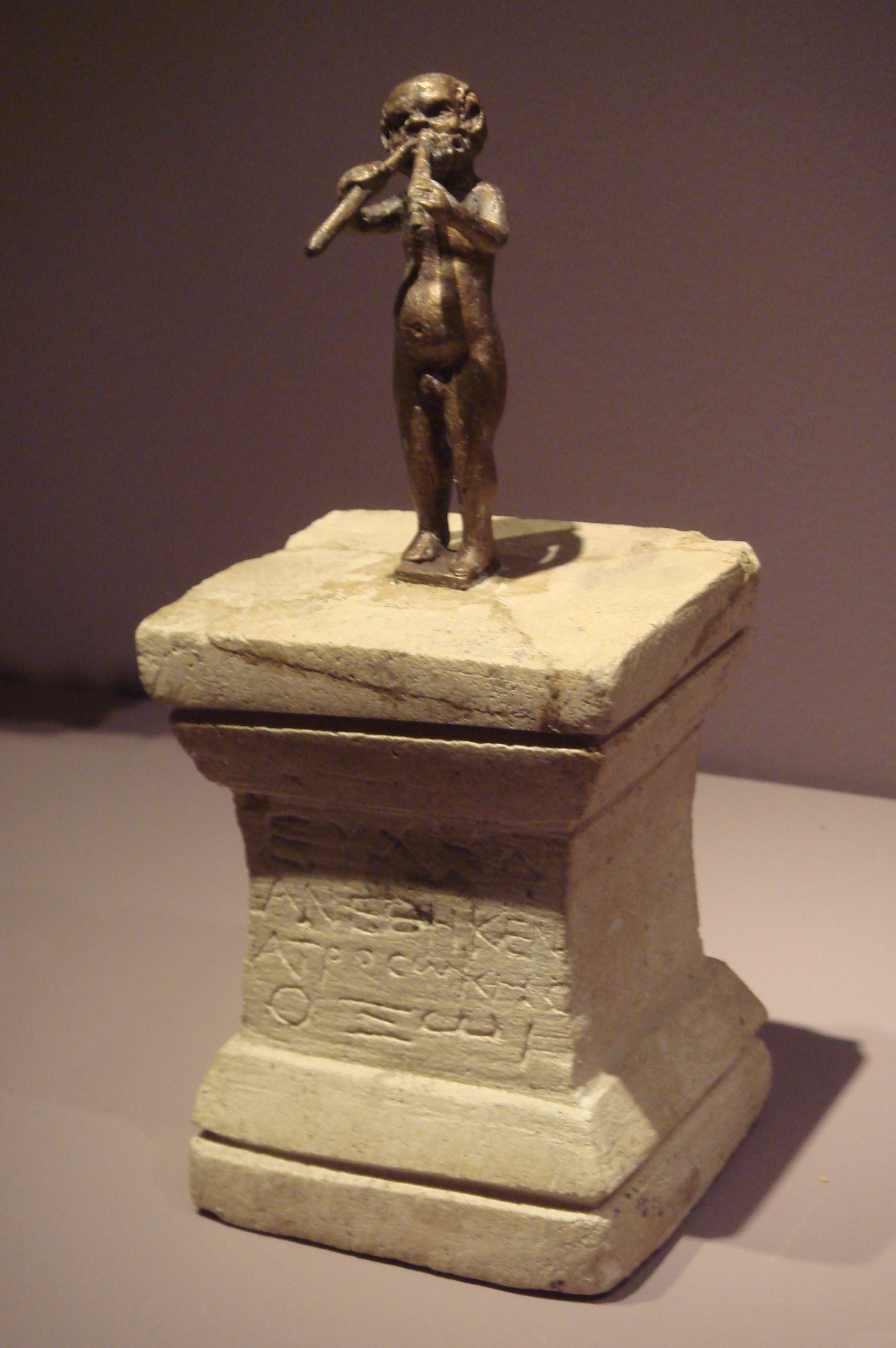
Hellenistic silenus Marsyas from Takhti Sangin, with dedication in Greek to the god of the Oxus, by "Atrosokes" (a Bactrian name). Temple of the Oxus, Takht-i Sangin, 200–150 BCE. Tajikistan National Museum.

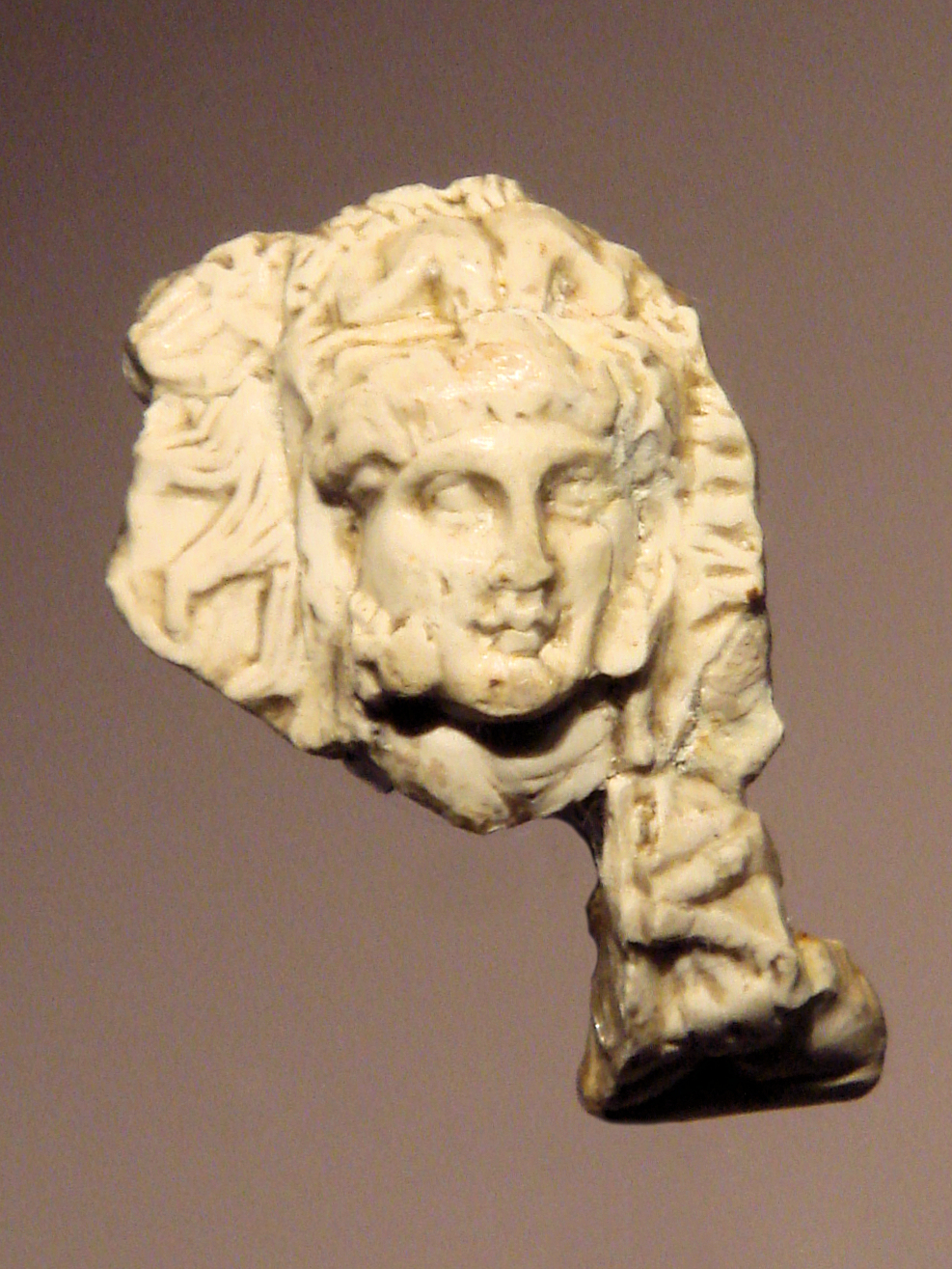
Alexander-Heracles head, Takht-i Sangin, Temple of the Oxus, 3rd century BCE.

=== Coinage ===
Some of the Greco-Bactrian coins, and those of their successors the Indo-Greeks, are considered the finest examples of Greek numismatic art with "a nice blend of realism and idealization", including the largest coins to be minted in the Hellenistic world: the largest gold coin was minted by Eucratides (reigned 171–145 BC), the largest silver coin by the Indo-Greek king Amyntas Nicator (reigned c. 95–90 BC). The portraits "show a degree of individuality never matched by the often bland depictions of their royal contemporaries further West" (Roger Ling, "Greece and the Hellenistic World").

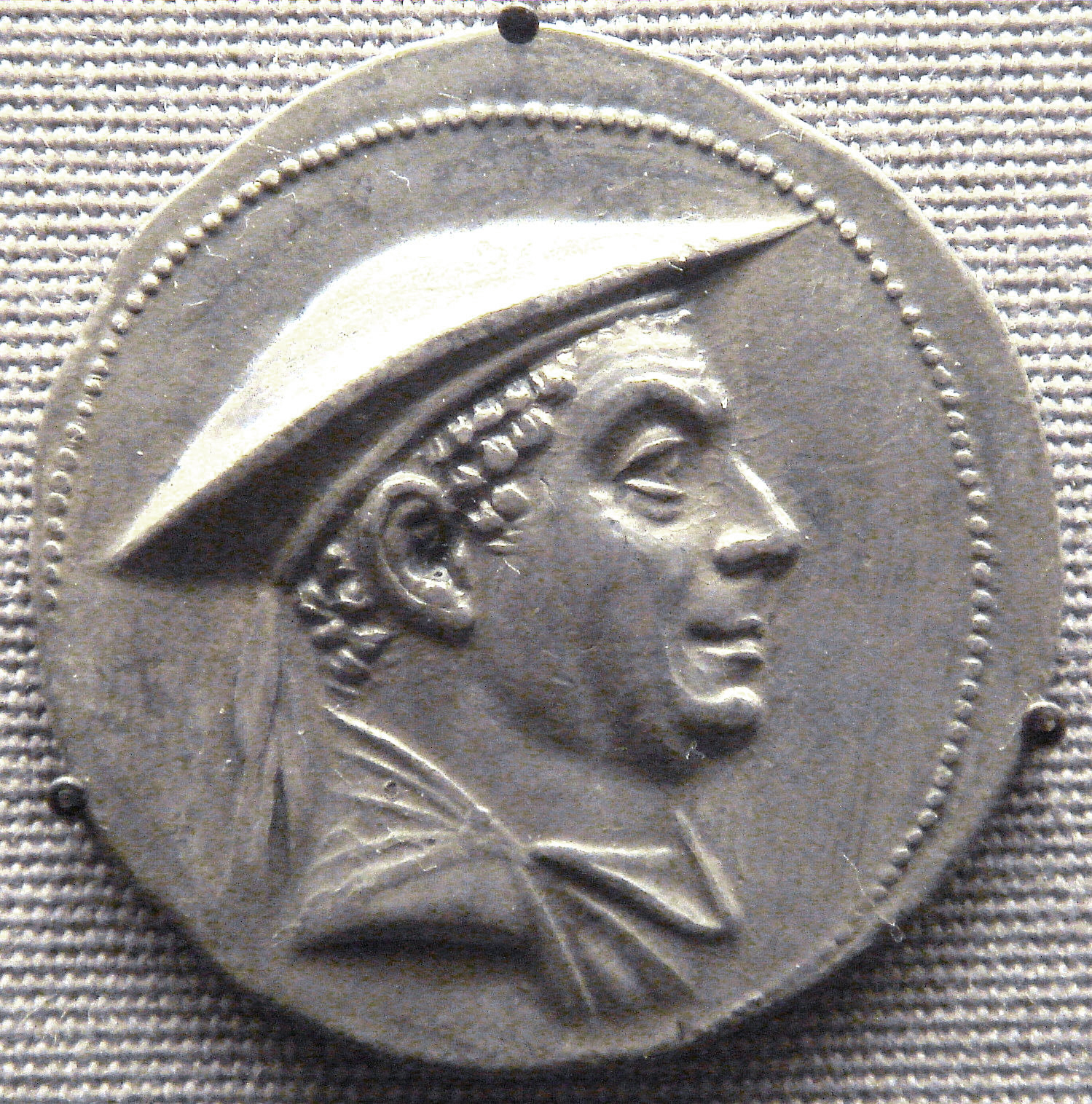
Coin of king Antimachus I wearing a Macedonian kausia hat. His portrait is oftentimes shown possessing a slight smile, as in this example.

Such portraits show high levels of detail with some kings seen smiling, while others are shown aging throughout their reign, even depicting old age on their coins. Such realistic imagery on coins seems to have been very important to the Greco-Bactrian kings, who wanted to display their individuality or to distinguish themselves from the style of other contemporary Hellenistic kingdoms.

Greco-Bactrian coins also depict the kings wearing distinct headgear, such as helmets modelled on the Boeotian cavalry helmet of Alexander the Great, or the Macedonian kausia. This is unique to the Greco-Bactrian kings, who first featured such designs on their coins as other Hellenistic rulers are shown to only wear the diadem. As such the Greco-Bactrians are especially known for their innovative coinage designs. Further examples include the use of different metal alloys for their coins and the issue of bilingual coinage, using Greek on the obverse and an Indian language (such as Pali) in the Kharoshti or Brahmi scripts on the reverse. Local Indian symbols and deities are also depicted, i.e. Buddhist symbols and some Hindu deities (see Influence on Indian art subsection below). This syncretic design was first introduced after king Demetrius I of Bactria conquered areas of the Indian subcontinent between 190 and 180 BC, with king Pantaleon being the first to issue coins of the Indian standard, when the Greeks truly started ruling over Indian populations.

=== Contacts with Han China ===
To the north, Euthydemus also ruled Sogdiana and Ferghana, and there are indications that from Alexandria Eschate the Greco-Bactrians may have led expeditions as far as Kashgar and Ürümqi in Xinjiang, leading to the first known contacts between China and the West around 220 BC. The Greek historian Strabo too writes that: "they extended their empire even as far as the Seres (Chinese) and the Phryni". (Strabo, XI.XI.I).

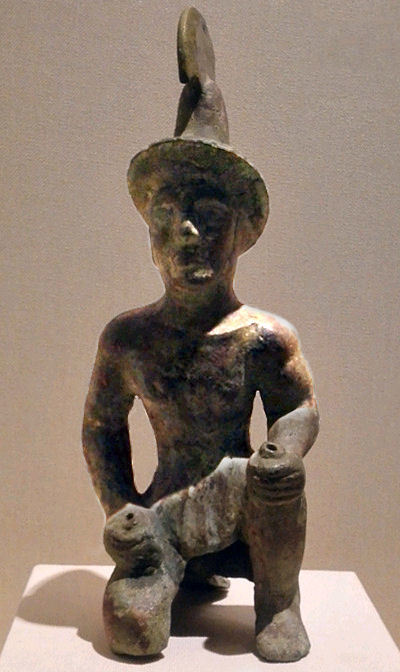
Possible statuette of a Greek hoplite, wearing a version of the Greek Phrygian helmet, from a 3rd-century BC burial site north of the Tian Shan, Xinjiang Region Museum, Ürümqi.

Several statuettes and representations of Greek soldiers have been found north of the Tian Shan, on the doorstep to China, and are today on display in the Xinjiang museum at Ürümqi (Boardman). (Note: On the image of the Greek kneeling warrior: "A bronze figurine of a kneeling warrior, not Greek work, but wearing a version of the Greek Phrygian helmet ... From a burial, said to be of the 4th century BC, just north of the Tien Shan range".) Middle Eastern or Greek influences on Chinese art have also been suggested (Hirth, Rostovtzeff). Designs with rosette flowers, geometric lines, meanders and glass inlays, suggestive of Egyptian, Persian, and/or Hellenistic influences, (Note: Notice of the British Museum on the Zhou vase (2005, attached image): "Red earthenware bowl, decorated with a slip and inlaid with glass paste. Eastern Zhou period, 4th–3rd century BC. This bowl may have intended to copy a possibly foreign vessel in bronze or even silver. Glass has been both imported from the Near East and produced domestically by the Zhou States since the 5th century BC.") can be found on some early Han dynasty bronze mirrors. (Note: "The things which China received from the Graeco-Iranian world-the pomegranate and other "Chang-Kien" plants, the heavy equipment of the cataphract, the traces of Greeks influence on Han art (such as) the famous white bronze mirror of the Han period with Graeco-Bactrian designs ... in the Victoria and Albert Museum" Its popularity at the end of the Eastern Zhou period may have been due to foreign influence.")

Some speculate that Greek influence is found in the artworks of the burial site of China's first Emperor Qin Shi Huang, dating back to the 3rd century BC, including in the manufacture of the famous Terracotta Army. This idea suggested that Greek artists may have come to China at that time to train local artisans in making sculptures However, this idea is disputed.

Numismatics also suggest that some technology exchanges may have occurred on these occasions: the Greco-Bactrians were the first in the world to issue cupro-nickel (75:25 ratio) coins, an alloy technology only known by the Chinese at the time under the name "White copper" (some weapons from the Warring States period were in copper-nickel alloy). The practice of exporting Chinese metals, in particular iron, for trade is attested around that period. Kings Euthydemus I, Euthydemus II, Agathocles and Pantaleon made these coin issues around 170 BC. An alternative suggestion is that the metal in the coinage derived from a mine where a cupro-nickel alloy occurred naturally, perhaps Anarak in eastern Iran. Copper-nickel would not be used again in coinage until the 19th century.

The presence of Chinese people in India from ancient times is also suggested by the accounts of the "Ciñas" in the Mahabharata and the Manu Smriti. When the famous Han dynasty explorer and ambassador Zhang Qian visited Bactria in approximately 126 BC, he reported the presence of Chinese products in the Bactrian markets:

“When I was in Bactria (Daxia)”, Zhang Qian reported, “I saw bamboo canes from Qiong and cloth made in the province of Shu (territories of southwestern China). When I asked the people how they had gotten such articles, they replied, ‘Our merchants go buy them in the markets of Shendu’ [India].”

— Shiji 123, Sima Qian, translation by Burton Watson).

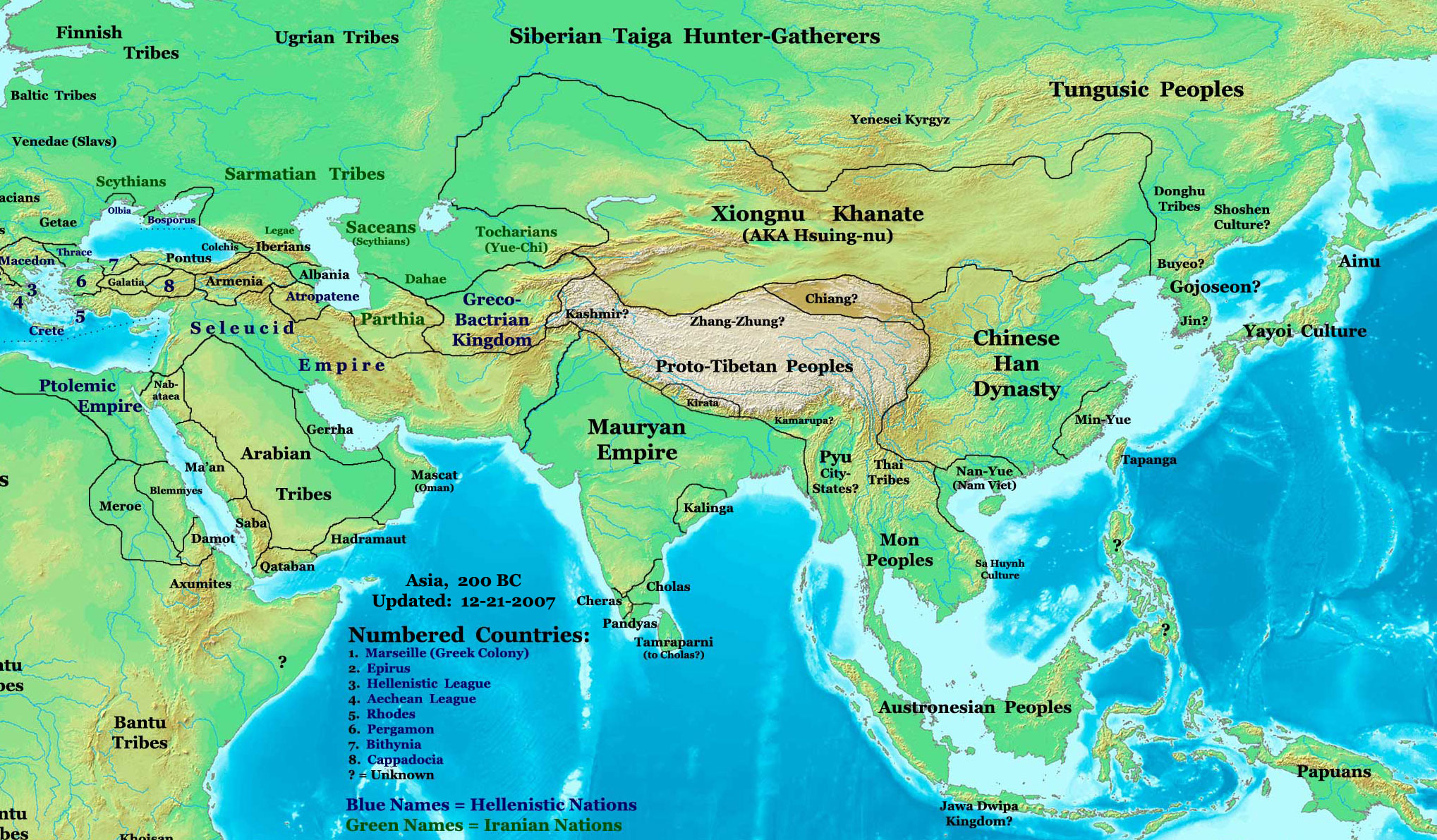
Map of Asia in c. 200 BC showing the Han dynasty, the Greco-Bactrian Kingdom, the Maurya Empire and the Yuezhi.

The purpose of Zhang Qian's journey was to look for civilizations on the steppe that the Han could ally with against the Xiongnu. Upon his return, Zhang Qian informed the Chinese emperor Han Wudi of the level of sophistication of the urban civilizations of Ferghana, Bactria and Parthia, who became interested in developing commercial relationships with them:

The Son of Heaven on hearing all this reasoned thus: Ferghana (Dayuan) and the possessions of Bactria (Daxia) and Parthia (Anxi) are large countries, full of rare things, with a population living in fixed abodes and given to occupations somewhat identical with those of the Chinese people, and placing great value on the rich produce of China. (Hanshu, Former Han History).

A number of Chinese envoys were then sent to Central Asia, triggering the development of the Silk Road from the end of the 2nd century BC.

=== Contacts with the Indian subcontinent (250–180 BC) ===
The Indian emperor Chandragupta, founder of the Maurya Empire, conquered the northwestern subcontinent upon the death of Alexander the Great around 323 BC. However, contacts were kept with his Greek neighbours in the Seleucid Empire, a dynastic alliance or the recognition of intermarriage between Greeks and Indians were established (described as an agreement on Epigamia in Ancient sources), and several Greeks, such as the historian Megasthenes, resided at the Mauryan court. Subsequently, each Mauryan emperor had a Greek ambassador at his court.

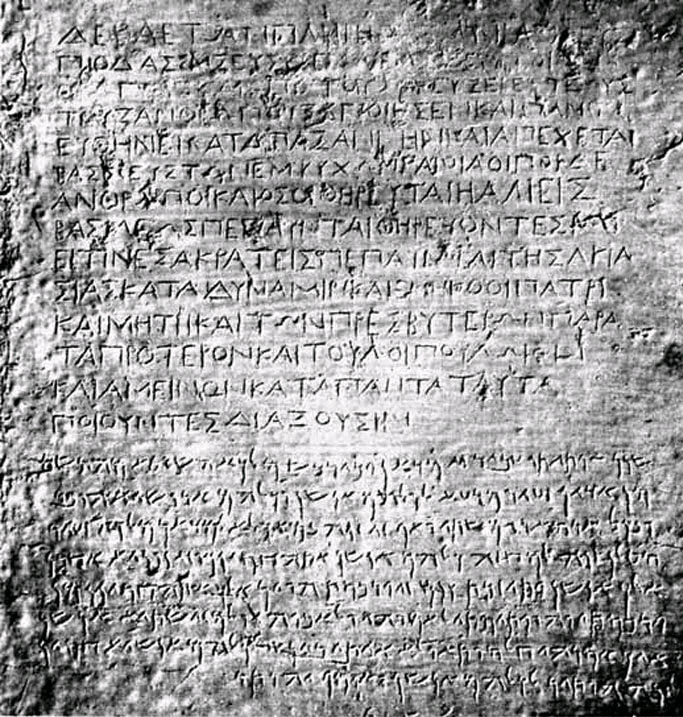
Kandahar Bilingual Rock Inscription of Ashoka (in Greek and Aramaic), found in Kandahar. c. 250 BC, Kabul Museum.

Chandragupta's grandson Ashoka converted to the Buddhist faith and became a great proselytizer in the line of the traditional Pali canon of Theravada Buddhism, directing his efforts towards the Indo-Iranic and the Hellenistic worlds from around 250 BC. According to the Edicts of Ashoka, set in stone, some of them written in Greek, he sent Buddhist emissaries to the Greek lands in Asia and as far as the Mediterranean. The edicts name each of the rulers of the Hellenistic world at the time.

The conquest by Dharma has been won here, on the borders, and even six hundred yojanas (4,000 miles) away, where the Greek king Antiochos rules, beyond there where the four kings named Ptolemy, Antigonos, Magas and Alexander rule, likewise in the south among the Cholas, the Pandyas, and as far as Tamraparni. (Edicts of Ashoka, 13th Rock Edict, S. Dhammika).

Some of the Greek populations that had remained in northwestern India apparently converted to Buddhism:

Here in the king's domain among the Greeks, the Kambojas, the Nabhakas, the Nabhapamkits, the Bhojas, the Pitinikas, the Andhras and the Palidas, everywhere people are following Beloved-of-the-Gods' instructions in Dharma. (Edicts of Ashoka, 13th Rock Edict, S. Dhammika).

Furthermore, according to Pali sources, some of Ashoka's emissaries were Greek Buddhist monks, indicating close religious exchanges between the two cultures:

When the thera (elder) Moggaliputta, the illuminator of the religion of the Conqueror (Ashoka), had brought the (third) council to an end ... he sent forth theras, one here and one there: ... and to Aparantaka (the "Western countries" corresponding to Gujarat and Sindh) he sent the Greek (Yona) named Dhammarakkhita ... and the thera Maharakkhita he sent into the country of the Yona. (Mahavamsa, XII).

Greco-Bactrians probably received these Buddhist emissaries (at least Maharakkhita, lit. "The Great Saved One", who was "sent to the country of the Yona") and somehow tolerated the Buddhist faith, although little proof remains. In the 2nd century AD, the Christian dogmatist Clement of Alexandria recognized the existence of Buddhist Sramanas among the Bactrians ("Bactrians" meaning "Oriental Greeks" in that period), and even their influence on Greek thought:

Thus philosophy, a thing of the highest utility, flourished in antiquity among the barbarians, shedding its light over the nations. And afterwards it came to Greece. First in its ranks were the prophets of the Egyptians; and the Chaldeans among the Assyrians; and the Druids among the Gauls; and the Sramanas among the Bactrians ("Σαρμαναίοι Βάκτρων"); and the philosophers of the Celts; and the Magi of the Persians, who foretold the Saviour's birth, and came into the land of Judea guided by a star. The Indian gymnosophists are also in the number, and the other barbarian philosophers. And of these there are two classes, some of them called Sramanas ("Σαρμάναι"), and others Brahmins ("Βραφμαναι").

==== Influence on Indian art during the 3rd century BC ====
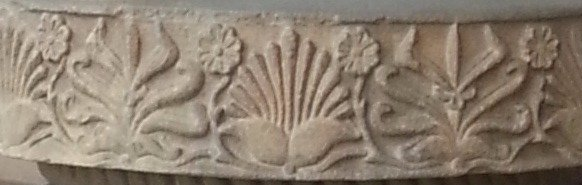
One of the Hellenistic-inspired "flame palmettes" and lotus designs, which may have been transmitted through Ai-Khanoum. Rampurva bull capital, India, circa 250 BC.

The Greco-Bactrian city of Ai-Khanoum, being located at the doorstep of India, interacting with the Indian subcontinent, and having a rich Hellenistic culture, was in a unique position to influence Indian culture as well. It is considered that Ai-Khanoum may have been one of the primary actors in transmitting Western artistic influence to India, for example in the creation of the Pillars of Ashoka or the manufacture of the quasi-Ionic Pataliputra capital, all of which were posterior to the establishment of Ai-Khanoum.

The scope of adoption goes from designs such as the bead and reel pattern, the central flame palmette design and a variety of other moldings, to the lifelike rendering of animal sculpture and the design and function of the Ionic anta capital in the palace of Pataliputra.

==== First visual representations of Indian deities ====
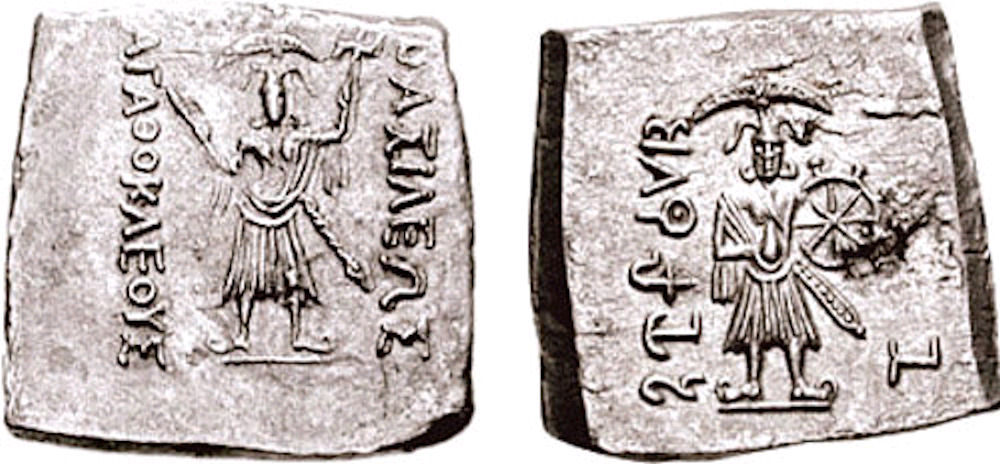
Coin of Agathocles showing Indian deities. Obverse with Greek legend: ΒΑΣΙΛΕΩΣ ΑΓΑΘΟΚΛΕΟΥΣ, Basileōs Agathokleous, "(of) King Agathocles". Reverse with Brahmi legend: 𑀭𑀚𑀦𑁂 𑀅𑀕𑀣𑀼𑀼𑀓𑁆𑀮𑁂𑀬𑁂𑀲, Rajane Agathuklayesa, "King Agathocles".

One of the last Greco-Bactrian kings, Agathocles of Bactria (ruled 190–180 BC), issued remarkable Indian-standard square coins bearing the first known representations of Indian deities, which have been variously interpreted as Vishnu, Shiva, Vasudeva, Buddha or Balarama. Altogether, six such Indian-standard silver drachmas in the name of Agathocles were discovered at Ai-Khanoum in 1970. These coins seem to be the first known representations of Vedic deities on coins, and they display early Avatars of Vishnu: Balarama-Sankarshana with attributes consisting of the Gada mace and the plow, and Vasudeva-Krishna with the Vishnu attributes of the Shankha (a pear-shaped case or conch) and the Sudarshana Chakra wheel. Some other coins by Agathocles are also thought to represent the Buddhist lion and the Indian goddess Lakshmi, consort of Vishnu. The Indian coinage of Agathocles is few but spectacular. These coins at least demonstrate the readiness of Greek kings to represent deities of foreign origin. The dedication of a Greek envoy to the cult of Garuda at the Heliodorus pillar in Besnagar could also be indicative of some level of religious syncretism.

=== Legacy in Central Asia and South Asia ===
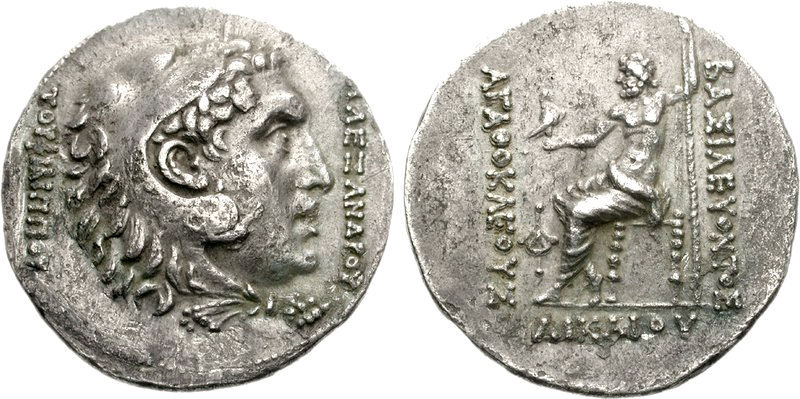
Commemorative coin of Agathocles of Bactria (reigned 190–180 BC), for Alexander the Great. The obverse shows Alexander as Heracles, with the Greek inscription: ΑΛΕΧΑΝΔΡΟΥ ΤΟΥ ΦΙΛΙΠΠΟΥ, Alexandrou tou Philippou, "Of Alexander, son of Philip". The reverse shows seated Zeus Aëtophoros, and Greek inscription: ΒΑΣΙΛΕΥΟΝΤΟΣ ΔΙΚΑΙΟΥ ΑΓΑΘΟΚΛΕΟΥΣ, Basileuontos Dikaiou Agathokleous, "During the reign of Agathocles the Just".

Overall, the Greco-Bactrians and their successors the Indo-Greeks, created a significant and influential civilisation in the region. During their 250-year-long rule, and with their highly developed Hellenistic tradition, they firmly established the Greek language and religious ideas in both Central Asia and northwestern India. The Greek language and writing was so prominent in Bactria in particular, that the invading tribes who settled in the region adopted the Greek alphabet to write their own language. The Bactrian language used in the region of modern-day Afghanistan continued to be written in the Greek script until the 9th century AD (nearly 1,000 years after the fall of the Greco-Bactrian kingdom). These tribes also heavily incorporated the Greek gods into their own religion and art. The Indo-Scythians, Indo-Parthians and the Yuezhi (who later became the Kushans), extensively copied the coin designs of the Greco-Bactrians (and the Indo-Greeks), but eventually this gave way to more diverse coin designs by the 1st century AD.

To the south, in the region of Arachosia, which was later controlled by the Indo-Greek kings, there is also evidence of persistence of Greek cities and language. For example, in his 1st-century AD Parthian stations itinerary, Isidore of Charax describes an "Alexandropolis, the metropolis of Arachosia", which he said was still Greek even at such a late time. The Kandahar Sophytos inscription from the same city, shows a real refinement of Greek language and culture so far east, and was likely written by a native man who had mastered the Greek language. The Greco-Bactrians and especially the Indo-Greeks were highly influential in the creation of syncretic artistic movements in India. The most important example being the Greco-Buddhist art of Gandhara found in the region of modern-day Pakistan and Afghanistan, which includes designs such as the ornate Indo-Corinthian capitals, and the drapery of Buddhist clothing, with some elements later spreading as far as Pataliputra in India.

== List of Greco-Bactrian kings ==
The below table lists the known Greek rulers of Bactria, along with their dates and titles or epithets.

Greco-Bactrian Kings (c. 255 BC–130 BC)
Reign (approx.)	King	Title
255–239 BC	Diodotus I	Soter
239–223 BC	Diodotus II	Theos
230–200 BC	Euthydemus I	Theos
200–180 BC	Demetrius I	Anicetus
200–180 BC	Pantaleon	Soter
190–180 BC	Agathocles	Dikaios
185–180 BC	Euthydemus II	—
180–170 BC	Antimachus I	Theos
180–160 BC	Apollodotus I	Soter
175–160 BC	Demetrius II	—
171–145 BC	Eucratides I	Megas
145–140 BC	Plato	Epiphanes
145–140 BC	Eucratides II	Soter
140–130 BC	Heliocles I	Dikaios

Dates that overlap show that multiple kings ruled at the same time, but in different regions whose exact details are not known very well. For example, Apollodotus I likely ruled areas south of Bactria and the Indian subcontinent while Antimachus I ruled in Bactria. Eucratides II and Heliocles I would have each ruled smaller parts of southern Bactria.

== See also ==
- Greco-Buddhism
- Indo-Greek Kingdom
- Indo-Scythians
- Ptolemaic Kingdom
- Seleucid Empire
- Yuezhi

== Sources ==
- Beckwith, Christopher I. (2009). Empires of the Silk Road: A History of Central Eurasia from the Bronze Age to the Present. Princeton University Press. ISBN 978-1-4008-2994-1.
- Boardman, John (1994). The Diffusion of Classical Art in Antiquity. Princeton University Press. ISBN 0-691-03680-2.
- Boardman, John, Jasper Griffin, and Oswyn Murray (2001). The Oxford Illustrated History of Greece and the Hellenistic World. Oxford University Press. ISBN 978-0-19-285438-4.
- Bopearachchi, Osmund (1991). Monnaies Gréco-Bactriennes et Indo-Grecques, Catalogue Raisonné. Bibliothèque Nationale de France, ISBN 2-7177-1825-7.
- Bopearachchi, Osmund and Christine Sachs (2003). De l'Indus à l'Oxus, Archéologie de l'Asie Centrale: catalogue de l'exposition. ISBN 2-9516679-2-2.
- Hitch, Doug (2010). "Empires of the Silk Road: A History of Central Eurasia from the Bronze Age to the Present" (PDF). Journal of the American Oriental Society. 130 (4): 654–658. Bibcode:2010IJNAr..39..207P. doi:10.1111/j.1095-9270.2009.00260_11.x. Archived from the original (PDF) on 26 December 2013.
- Holt, F. L. (1989). Alexander the Great and Bactria: The Formation of a Greek Frontier in Central Asia: 2nd Edition. Leiden: Brill. ISBN 90-04-08612-9.
- McEvilley, Thomas (2002). The Shape of Ancient Thought. Comparative studies in Greek and Indian Philosophies. Allworth Press and the School of Visual Arts. ISBN 1-58115-203-5
- Narain, A. K. (1990). "Indo-Europeans in Central Asia". In Sinor, Denis (ed.). The Cambridge History of Early Inner Asia. Vol. 1. Cambridge University Press. pp. 151–177. doi:10.1017/CHOL9780521243049.007. ISBN 978-1-139-05489-8.
- Puri, B. N. (2000). Buddhism in Central Asia. Motilal Banarsidass, Delhi. ISBN 81-208-0372-8.
- Tarn, W. W. (1966). The Greeks in Bactria and India. 2nd Edition. Cambridge University Press.
- Watson, Burton, trans. (1993). Records of the Great Historian: Han Dynasty II, by Sima Qian. Columbia University Press. ISBN 0-231-08167-7.
