= Heliocles I =

Greco-Bactrian king

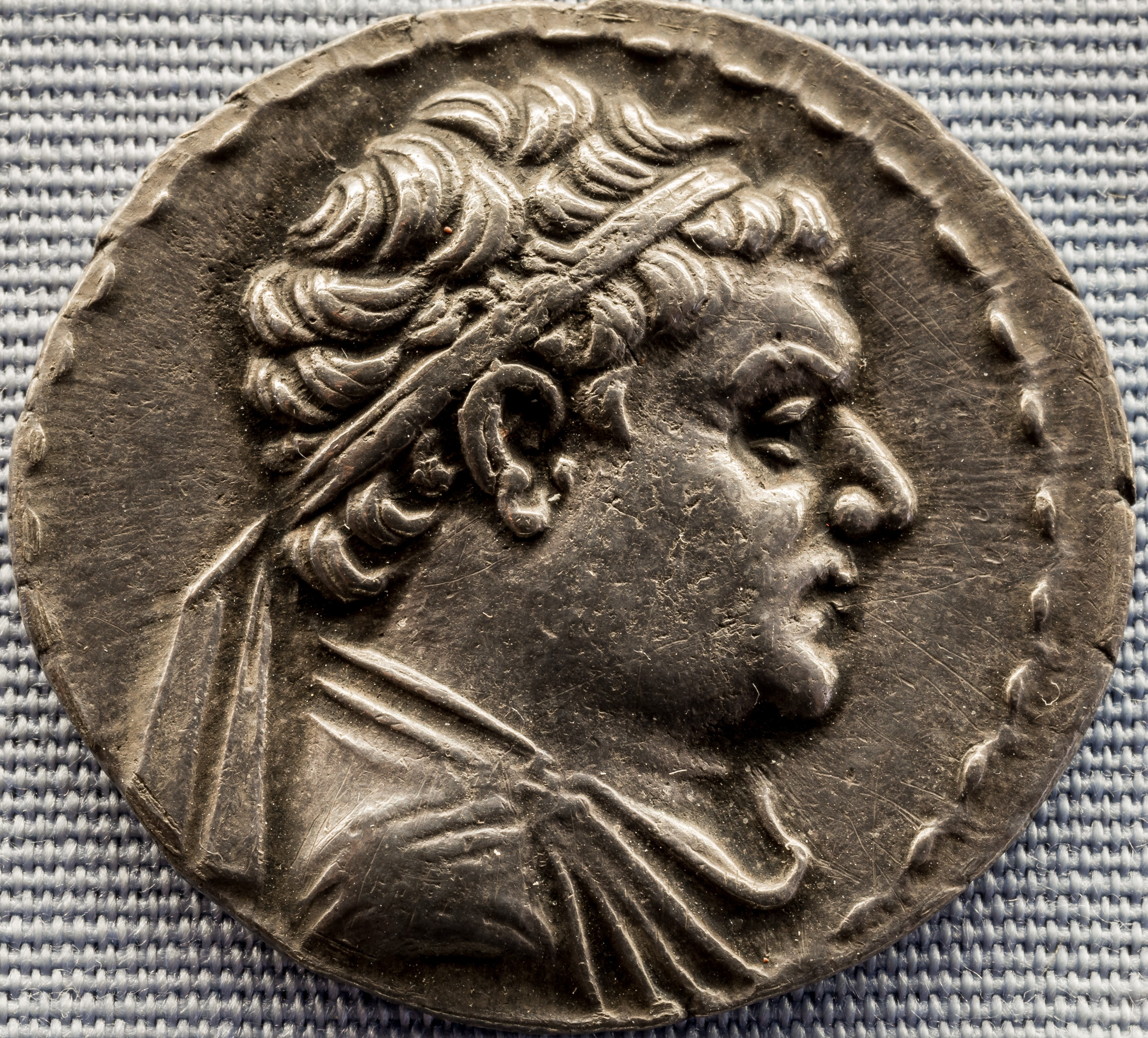
Portrait of Heliocles I on the obverse of one of his silver coins, showing the king wearing a royal diadem and a chlamys cloak.

Heliocles I (Ancient Greek: Ἡλιοκλῆς, romanized: Hēlioklês, meaning "glory of Helios"; reigned c. 145–120 BC) was a Greco-Bactrian king, a son and successor of Eucratides the Great, and considered the last Greek king to reign over the Bactrian country.

== Reign ==
His reign was a troubled one; according to Roman historian Justin, Eucratides was murdered crossing the Hindu Kush by one of his sons, although this is highly disputed and Justin fails to name the perpetrator. Eucratides’ death led to instability, even civil war, which caused the Indian parts of the empire to be lost to Indo-Greek king Menander I and southern Bactria to be lost to the Yuezhi.

== Yuezhi invasion ==
From 130 BC a nomadic people, the Yuezhi, started to invade Bactria from the north and we could assume that Heliocles was likely killed in battle during this invasion. Details from Chinese sources seem to indicate that the nomad invasion did not end civilisation in Bactria entirely. Hellenised cities continued to exist for some time, and the well-organised agricultural systems were not demolished.

The Yuezhi would copy and adapt the coin types of Heliocles I for a long time after the latter's death.

Heliocles I used the Greek epithet Dikaios ("the Just") on his coins. There is evidence that Heliocles I ruled around the same time as Eucratides II, as a silver coin has been discovered showing both rulers sharing the coin in a joint issue.

== Gallery ==
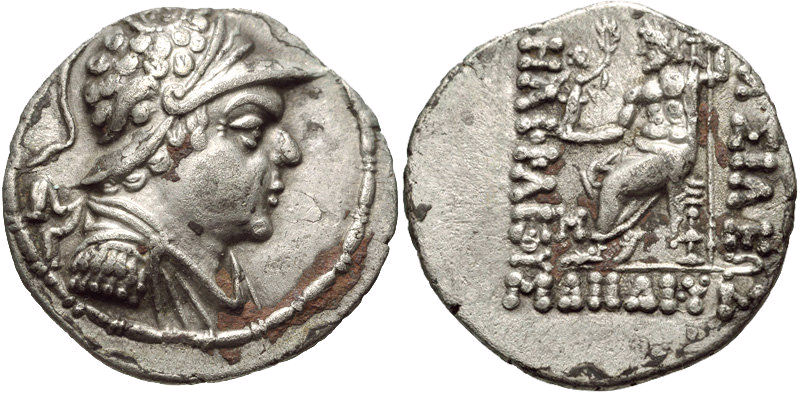
Tetradrachm of Heliocles I, showing the king helmetted and in uniform. Reverse shows seated Zeus and Greek legend: ΒΑΣΙΛΕΩΣ ΔΙΚΑΙΟΥ ΗΛΙΟΚΛΕΟΥΣ Basileōs Dikaiou Hēliokleous, "Of King Heliocles the Just".

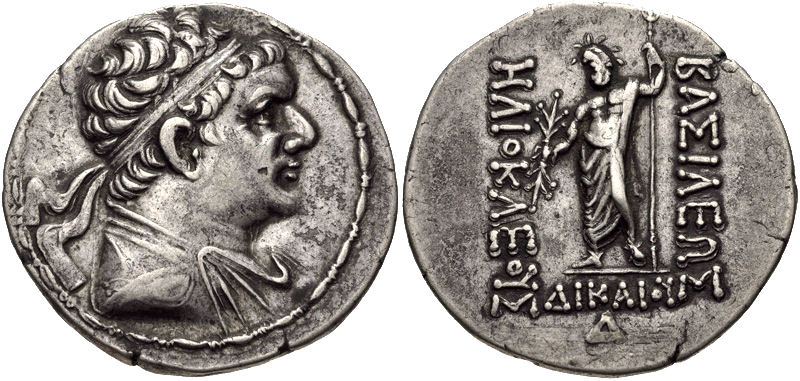
Tetradrachm of Heliocles I. The Reverse shows standing Zeus, and Greek legend: ΒΑΣΙΛΕΩΣ ΔΙΚΑΙΟΥ ΗΛΙΟΚΛΕΟΥΣ, Basileōs Dikaiou Hēliokleous, "Of King Heliocles the Just".

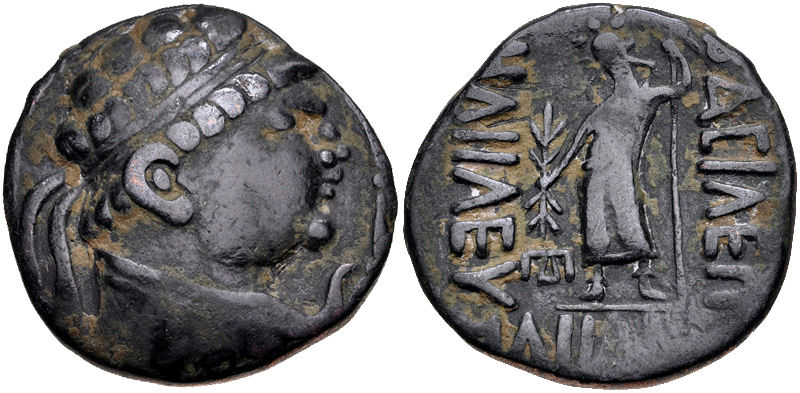
Yuezhi copy of a coin of king Heliocles I. The Yuezhi are thought to have invaded his territory and taken over his coinage as a consequence.

| Preceded by Eucratides | Greco-Bactrian King (in Eastern Bactria); 145 – 130 BCE | Succeeded by Zoilos I |

| | Greco-Bactrian kings | | Indo-Greek kings | | | | | |
| Territories/ dates | West Bactria | East Bactria | Paropamisade | Arachosia | Gandhara | Western Punjab | Eastern Punjab | Mathura |
| 326-325 BCE | Campaigns of Alexander the Great in India | | | | | | Nanda Empire | |
| 312 BCE | Creation of the Seleucid Empire | | | | | | Creation of the Maurya Empire | |
| 305 BCE | Seleucid Empire after Mauryan war | | Maurya Empire | | | | | |
| 280 BCE | Foundation of Ai-Khanoum | | | | | | | |
| 255–239 BCE | Independence of the Greco-Bactrian kingdom Diodotus I | | Emperor Ashoka (268-232 BCE) | | | | | |
| 239–223 BCE | Diodotus II | | | | | | | |
| 230–200 BCE | Euthydemus I | | | | | | | |
| 200–190 BCE | Demetrius I | | | | Sunga Empire | | | |
| 190-185 BCE | Euthydemus II | | | | | | | |
| 190–180 BCE | Agathocles | | | Pantaleon | | | | |
| 185–170 BCE | Antimachus I | | | | | | | |
| 180–160 BCE | | | Apollodotus I | | | | | |
| 175–170 BCE | Demetrius II | | | | | | | |
| 160–155 BCE | | | Antimachus II | | | | | |
| 170–145 BCE | Eucratides I | | | | | | | |
| 155–130 BCE | Yuezhi occupation, loss of Ai-Khanoum | Eucratides II; Plato; Heliocles I | Menander I | | | | | |
| 130–120 BCE | Yuezhi occupation | | Zoilus I | | Agathoclea | | | Yavanarajya inscription |
| 120–110 BCE | | | Lysias | | Strato I | | | Yavanarajya inscription |
| 110–100 BCE | | | Antialcidas | | Heliocles II | | | Yavanarajya inscription |
| 100 BCE | | | Polyxenus | | Demetrius III | | | Yavanarajya inscription |
| 100–95 BCE | | | Philoxenus | | | | | Yavanarajya inscription |
| 95–90 BCE | | | Diomedes | Amyntas | | Epander | | Yavanarajya inscription |
| 90 BCE | | | Theophilus | Peucolaus | | Thraso | | Yavanarajya inscription |
| 90–85 BCE | | | Nicias | Menander II | | Artemidorus | | Yavanarajya inscription |
| 90–70 BCE | | | Hermaeus | Archebius | | | | Yavanarajya inscription |
| | | | Yuezhi occupation | | Maues (Indo-Scythian) | | | |
| 75–70 BCE | | | | Vonones | Telephus | Apollodotus II | | |
| 65–55 BCE | | | | Spalirises | | Hippostratus | Dionysius | |
| 55–35 BCE | | | | | Azes I (Indo-Scythians) | | Zoilus II | |
| 55–35 BCE | | | | | Vijayamitra/ Azilises | | Apollophanes | |
| 25 BCE – 10 CE | | | | Gondophares | Zeionises | Kharahostes | Strato II; Strato III | |
| | | | | Gondophares (Indo-Parthian) | | | Rajuvula (Indo-Scythian) | |
| | | | Kujula Kadphises (Kushan Empire) | | | | Bhadayasa (Indo-Scythian) | Sodasa (Indo-Scythian) |
