= Royal formula of Parthian coinage =

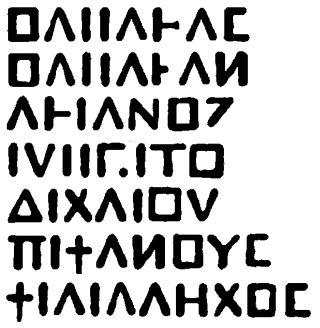
the inscription "ΒΑΣΙΛΕΩΣ ΒΑΣΙΛΕΩΝ ΑΡΣΑΚΟΥ ΕΥΕΡΓΕΤΟΥ ΔΙΚΑΙΟΥ ΕΠΙΦΑΝΟΥΣ ΦΙΛΕΛΛΗΝΟΣ" in a highly stylized variant of the Greek alphabet

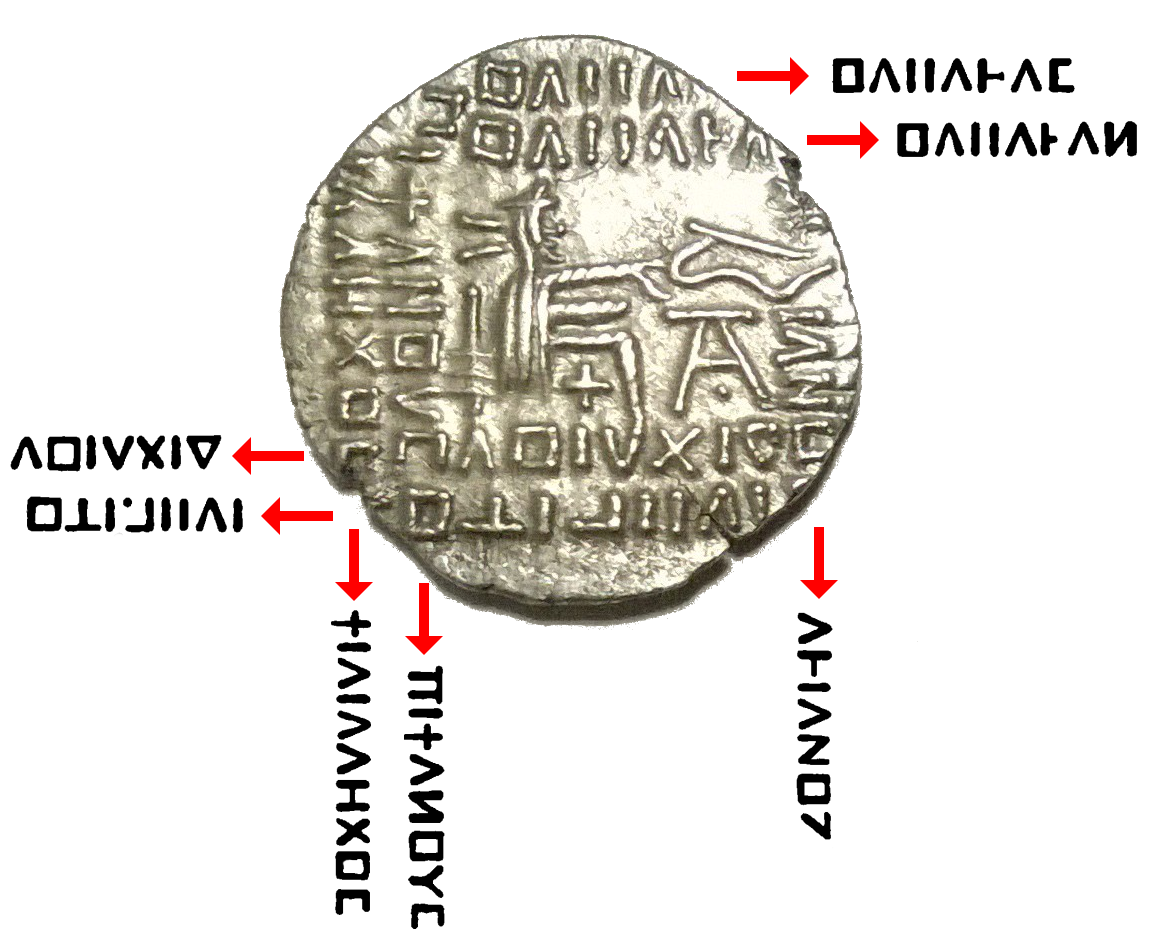
Royal formula on the reverse of a coin of Pacorus I

Greek inscriptions similar to "ΒΑΣΙΛΕΩΣ ΒΑΣΙΛΕΩΝ ΑΡΣΑΚΟΥ ΕΥΕΡΓΕΤΟΥ ΔΙΚΑΙΟΥ ΕΠΙΦΑΝΟΥΣ ΦΙΛΕΛΛΗΝΟΣ", meaning "[coin] of king of kings Arsaces, the benefactor (Euergetes), the just (Dikaios), the illustrious (Epiphanes), friend of the Greeks (Philhellen)", are found on coins of the Parthian Empire, starting from the reign of Artabanus I. Some variations of this inscription exist.

The name Arsaces indicates the Arsacid dynasty and appears until the period of Phraates IV.

== Transliteration ==
BASILEOS BASILEON ARSAKOU EUERGETOU DIKAIOU EPIPHANOUS PHILHELLENOS.

== Literal translation ==
Some of the more frequent epithets appearing in the royal formula:

- ΒΑΣΙΛΕΩΣ ΒΑΣΙΛΕΩΝ = Of the King of kings (Basileus of basileis)
- ΜΕΓΑΛΟΥ = the Great (genitive form)
- ΑΡΣΑΚΟΥ = Arsaces (genitive form)
- ΕΥΕΡΓΕΤΟΥ = Euergetes, the Benefactor (genitive form)
- ΑΥΤΟΚΡΑΤΟΡΟΣ = Autokratōr, absolute ruler (genitive form)
- ΔΙΚΑΙΟΥ = Dikaios, the Just (genitive form)
- ΕΠΙΦΑΝΟΥΣ = Epiphanes, the Illustrious (genitive form)
- ΦΙΛΟΠΑΤΟΡΟΣ = Philopator, father-loving (genitive form)
- ΦΙΛΕΛΛΗΝΟΣ = Philhellene, the Friend of the Greeks (genitive form)
