= Daxia =

Name for Tushara or Tokharistan

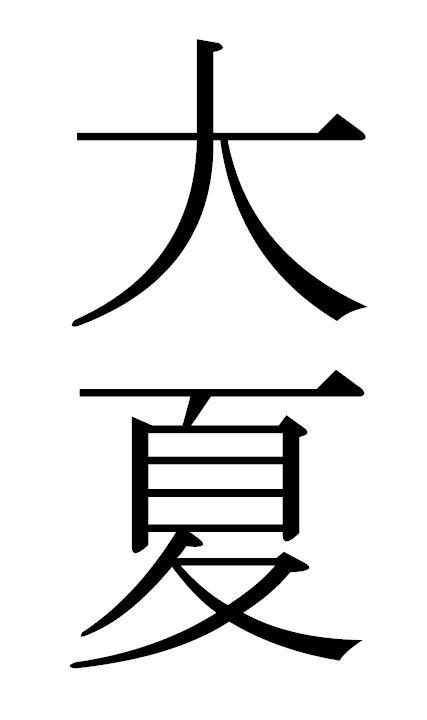
Chinese characters for Ta-Hsia or Daxia

Daxia, Ta-Hsia, or Ta-Hia (Chinese: 大夏; pinyin: Dàxià; literally: 'Great Xia') was apparently the name given in antiquity by the Han Chinese to Tukhara or Tokhara: the main part of Bactria, in what is now northern Afghanistan, and parts of southern Tajikistan and Uzbekistan.

The name "Daxia" first appears in Chinese accounts from the 3rd century BCE, to designate a kingdom in the far west – possibly a consequence of the first contacts with the expansion of the Greco-Bactrian Kingdom – and then is used by the explorer Zhang Qian in 126 BCE to designate Bactria.

It is possible that "Daxia", in part, conflated or confused Tokhara with the country of the Dahae (on the south-eastern shores of the Caspian Sea), who were usually known in classical Chinese sources as the Dayi (Chinese: 大益; pinyin: Dayi).

Daxia is mentioned by, for instance, Chapter VIII (Xiao Kuang) of the Guanzi (7th Century BCE): "In the west [Duke Huan]... having passed through the valleys of the Taihang and Bier, took captive the chief of the Da Xia. Further to the west, he subjugated the Xi Yu of Liusha, and for the first time the Rong People of Qin were obedient." (Taihang and Bier are located along the Shanxi-Hebei border in China.)

The reports of Zhang Qian are preserved in Shiji ("Records of the Great Historian") by Sima Qian in the 1st century BCE.

They describe an important urban civilization of about one million people, living in walled cities under small city kings or magistrates. Daxia was an affluent country with rich markets, trading in an incredible variety of objects, coming as far as Southern China. By the time Zhang Qian visited Daxia, there was no longer a major king and the Bactrians were suzerains to the nomadic Yuezhi, who were settled to the north of their territory beyond the Oxus. Overall, Zhang Qian depicted a rather sophisticated but demoralized people who were afraid of war.

Following these reports, the Chinese emperor Wudi was informed of the level of sophistication of the urban civilizations of Ferghana, Bactria and Parthia, and became interested in developing commercial relationships with them:

Thus the emperor learned of Dayuan, Daxia, Anxi, and the others, all states rich in unusual products whose people cultivated the land and made their living in much the same way as the Chinese. All these states, he was told, were militarily weak and prized Han goods and wealth. (Shiji 123)

These contacts immediately led to the dispatch of multiple embassies from the Chinese, initiating the development of the Silk Road.
