= Dikaios =

Dikaios (Greek: δίκαιος, lit. 'righteous, just'; sometimes romanised as Dicaeus) is a title first used by Hellenistic Greek rulers, and later also given to holy men and women of the Old Testament in Eastern Christianity.

== Etymology ==
The term is derived from the Greek word δίκη (díkē, “custom, justice”) and the suffix -ιος (-ios, an adjective-forming suffix). This is also related to the name of the goddess of justice, Dike.

== Usage ==
The word dikaios was mainly used as an epithet in the titles of Hellenized dynasts in regions such as Bactria Parthia, Cappadocia, and Pontus.

In Eastern Christianity, dikaios distinguishes these individuals from saints recognized in the Christian era. These righteous individuals, known as dikaioi, are celebrated with their own feast days in the liturgical year. Notably, figures like the Maccabees are commemorated akin to Christian martyrs, and even Pontius Pilate is honored as one of the Righteous in the Coptic Orthodox Church.

== Facts ==
- Eastern Christianity uses dikaios to distinguish pre-Christian era righteous individuals from saints recognized after Christ's time.
- Celebrated with their own feast days, these righteous figures, known as dikaioi, include the Maccabees and even Pontius Pilate in some traditions.
- Apart from its religious usage, dikaios was a common epithet in the titles of hellenized dynasts in various regions.

== See also ==
- Royal formula of Parthian coinage
