= City Museum, Gorkhatri =

City Museum
- د ښار موزه
- Established: 2006; 20 years ago
- Location: Gorkhatri, Peshawar, Khyber Pakhtunkhwa, Pakistan
- Coordinates: 34.0078°N 71.5795°E
- Type: Archaeology museum
- Owner: Government of Khyber Pakhtunkhwa
- Website: kparchaeology.gkp.pk

City Museum is an archaeology museum located on the archaeological site of Gorkhatri, Peshawar in the Khyber Pakhtunkhwa province of Pakistan. The museum was inaugurated on 23 March 2006 by Akram Khan Durrani, the then Chief Minister of Khyber Pakhtunkhwa.

The museum consists of three galleries: archaeological, ethnological, and antiquities. The latter is the most recent addition, exhibiting the antiquities of the British Raj which provide detailed information about archaeological and ethnological profile of Peshawar.

== History ==
Gorkhatri is the highest place in Peshawar and it is located at the heart of walled city of old Peshawar. The site having a huge deposit of the historical periods began from the Indo-Greeks or even earlier. The current structure of the Gorkhatri complex was established by Jahanara Begum, the daughter of the Mughal emperor Shah Jahan in 1640 A.D.

== Excavation ==
The excavations took place at the site of Gorkhatri from 1994 to 1995 and from that time on a series of excavations took place in the subsequent years. The complex was established as caravanserai for the merchandiser who came to Peshawar from Central Asia and Afghanistan and other areas. It was originally consisting of two monumental entrance (gateways), a Jamia Masjid and Hamam and a sequential of small cells (rooms) on four sides. The area is now occupied by modern buildings and a Hindu temple only the gateways and some small cells are present. The archaeological gallery of this museum represents a continuous profile of the Peshawar Valley in the form of excavation material recovered from the site of Gorkhuttree. This was discovered by an excavation from 2002 to 2011 led by the Directorate of Archaeology and Museums Government of Khyber Pakhtunkhwa. The second gallery is of ethnological culture of Peshawar, where household objects, traditional dresses, armaments, ornaments, musical instruments, arts, and craft objects are exhibited.

== See also ==
- Peshawar Museum
- List of museums in Pakistan
