= Lysias Anicetus =

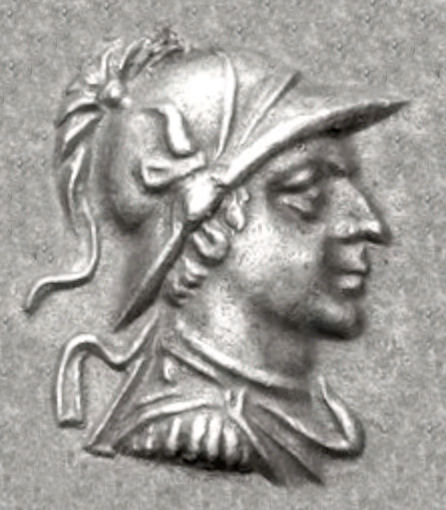
- Portrait of Lysias

Indo-Greek king
- Reign: 130–120 BC

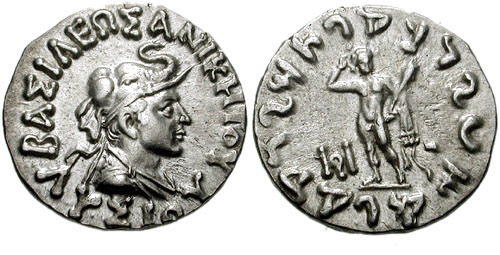
Silver coin of Lysias. The Obverse shows the king wearing an elephant scalp and diadem, with the Greek legend: ΒΑΣΙΛΕΩΣ ΑΝΙΚΗΤΟΥ ΛΥΣΙΟΥ, Basileōs Anikētou Lysiou, "Of the Invincible King Lysias". The reverse shows nude Heracles standing, crowning himself, holding club, lion's skin, and palm. Kharosthi legend reads: Maharajasa Apadihatasa Lisiasa, "Of the Great Invincible King Lysias".

Lysias Anicetus (Greek: Λυσίας ὁ Ἀνίκητος, Lysías ho Aníkētos, "Lysias the Invincible") was an Indo-Greek king from around 130–120 BC.

== Time of reign ==
According to numismatist Bopearachchi, Lysias was a close successor to Menander I and Zoilos I, and therefore may have ruled around 130–120 BC. R. C. Senior suggests a similar date.

Bopearachchi suggests that Lysias' territory covered the areas of the Paropamisade and Arachosia, but his coins have been found in the Punjab and it is possible that Lysias ruled most of the Indo-Greek territory for a period, though perhaps in cooperation with Antialcidas, with whom he shared most of his monograms.

Lysias apparently claimed to be a descendant of Demetrius, using a similar reverse of Heracles crowning himself, Demetrius' epithet Invincible, and sometimes the elephant crown always worn by this king. A similar reverse was also used by Zoilus I, who may have ruled some decades earlier and was likely an enemy of Menander.

Lysias' rule seems to have begun after the murder of Menander's infant son Thrason, and since his coins do not resemble Menander's it seems as though he, just as Zoilus, belonged to a competing line. Despite his magnificent coinage, his policies were probably rather defensive. The Bactrian kingdom had recently fallen to invading nomads and though the Indo-Greeks managed to avoid the same fate, they became isolated from the Hellenistic world.

== Coin types ==
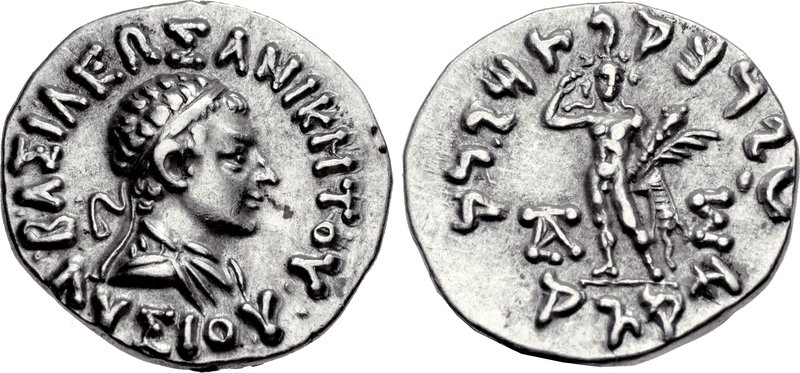
Silver coin of Lysias. The Obverse shows the king bareheaded and wearing a royal diadem, with surrounding Greek legend. The reverse shows nude Heracles standing, crowning himself, holding club, lion's skin, and palm, and with Kharosthi legend.

Lysias issued a number of bilingual Indian coins. On his silver portrait types he appears either diademed or dressed in various types of headgear worn by earlier kings: the elephant scalp of Demetrios I, a bull's horns helmet or Corinthian helmet with scales, and the Greek flat hat "kausia". He also appeared throwing a spear.

The reverse is always Herakles crowning himself, and holding his club, with the new addition of a palm to signify victory.

He also issued a series of Attic tetradrachms, and even smaller denominations (a hemidrachm is known) for circulation in Bactria.

His Indian type square bronzes show a bust of Herakles/elephant.

== "Mule coins" (overstrikes) ==
There is a bronze which features the obverse of Lysias and the reverse of Antialcidas. This was interpreted by Tarn and other earlier scholars as though the two kings might have forged some kind of alliance, but later, a bronze with the opposite arrangement was found.

The modern view is that these coins were "mules"--in other words, an improperly overstruck issue of one of the pertinent rulers. While not signs of an alliance, they still suggest that Lysias' and Antialcidas' reigns were adjacent.

== Gallery ==
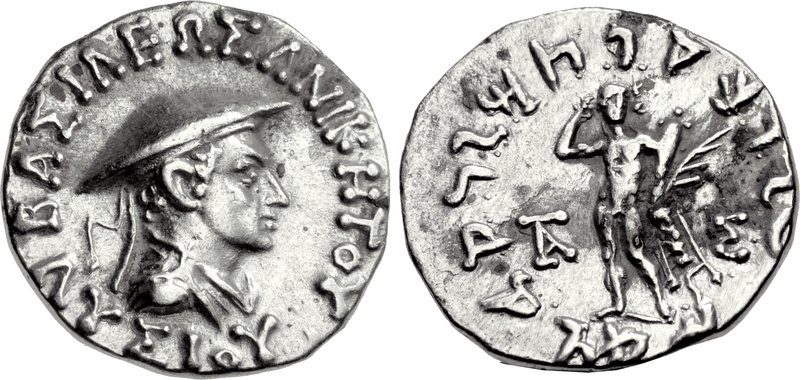
Silver coin of Lysias. Obverse shows the king wearing a kausia hat and the royal diadem, with the Greek legend: ΒΑΣΙΛΕΩΣ ΑΝΙΚΗΤΟΥ ΛΥΣΙΟΥ, Basileōs Anikētou Lysiou. Reverse with standing Heracles, and Kharosthi legend: Maharajasa Apadihatasa Lisiasa, "Of the Great Invincible King Lysias".

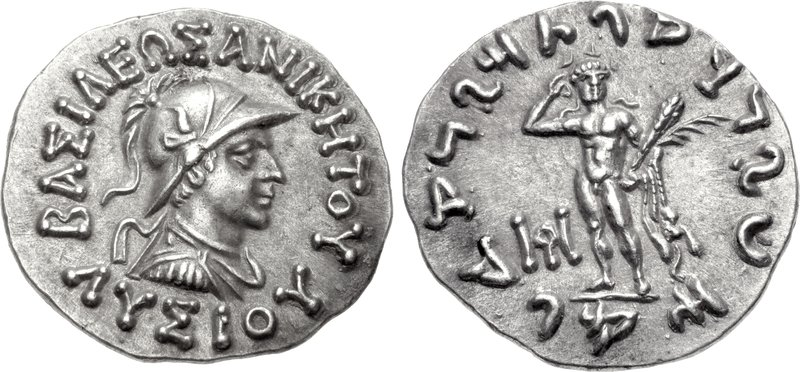
Another silver coin of Lysias. The obverse shows the king in uniform, wearing a crested Boeotian helmet and a royal diadem, with surrounding Greek legend. The reverse shows standing Heracles, and surrounding Kharosthi legend.

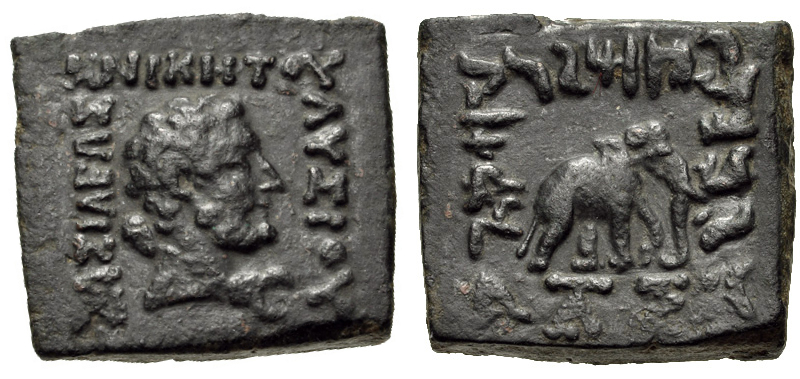
Indian square coin of Lysias. The Obverse, shows the head of Heracles, and with Greek legend. The reverse shows a walking elephant, and Kharosthi legend.

== See also ==
- Indo-Greek Kingdom
- Greco-Buddhism
- Indo-Scythians

Preceded by Zoilos I	Indo-Greek king (in Paropamisadae, Arachosia); 120 – 110 BC	Succeeded by Antialcidas

	Greco-Bactrian kings		Indo-Greek kings					
Territories/ dates	West Bactria	East Bactria	Paropamisade	Arachosia	Gandhara	Western Punjab	Eastern Punjab	Mathura
326-325 BCE	Campaigns of Alexander the Great in India						Nanda Empire	
312 BCE	Creation of the Seleucid Empire						Creation of the Maurya Empire	
305 BCE	Seleucid Empire after Mauryan war		Maurya Empire					
280 BCE	Foundation of Ai-Khanoum							
255–239 BCE	Independence of the Greco-Bactrian kingdom Diodotus I		Emperor Ashoka (268-232 BCE)					
239–223 BCE	Diodotus II							
230–200 BCE	Euthydemus I							
200–190 BCE	Demetrius I				Sunga Empire			
190-185 BCE	Euthydemus II							
190–180 BCE	Agathocles			Pantaleon				
185–170 BCE	Antimachus I							
180–160 BCE			Apollodotus I					
175–170 BCE	Demetrius II							
160–155 BCE			Antimachus II					
170–145 BCE	Eucratides I							
155–130 BCE	Yuezhi occupation, loss of Ai-Khanoum	Eucratides II; Plato; Heliocles I	Menander I					
130–120 BCE	Yuezhi occupation		Zoilus I		Agathoclea			Yavanarajya inscription
120–110 BCE			Lysias		Strato I			Yavanarajya inscription
110–100 BCE			Antialcidas		Heliocles II			Yavanarajya inscription
100 BCE			Polyxenus		Demetrius III			Yavanarajya inscription
100–95 BCE			Philoxenus					Yavanarajya inscription
95–90 BCE			Diomedes	Amyntas		Epander		Yavanarajya inscription
90 BCE			Theophilus	Peucolaus		Thraso		Yavanarajya inscription
90–85 BCE			Nicias	Menander II		Artemidorus		Yavanarajya inscription
90–70 BCE			Hermaeus	Archebius				Yavanarajya inscription
			Yuezhi occupation		Maues (Indo-Scythian)			
75–70 BCE				Vonones	Telephus	Apollodotus II		
65–55 BCE				Spalirises		Hippostratus	Dionysius	
55–35 BCE					Azes I (Indo-Scythians)		Zoilus II	
55–35 BCE					Vijayamitra/ Azilises		Apollophanes	
25 BCE – 10 CE				Gondophares	Zeionises	Kharahostes	Strato II; Strato III	
				Gondophares (Indo-Parthian)			Rajuvula (Indo-Scythian)	
			Kujula Kadphises (Kushan Empire)				Bhadayasa (Indo-Scythian)	Sodasa (Indo-Scythian)
