= Zoilus I =

Zoilus I Dicaeus ("The Just")
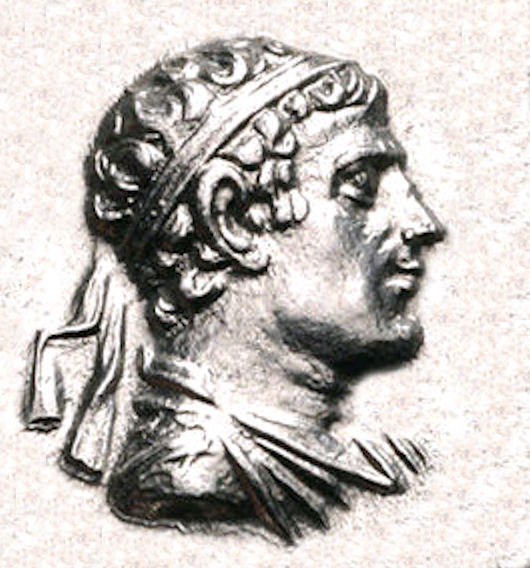
- Portrait of Zoilos I.

Indo-Greek king
- Reign: 130–120 BC

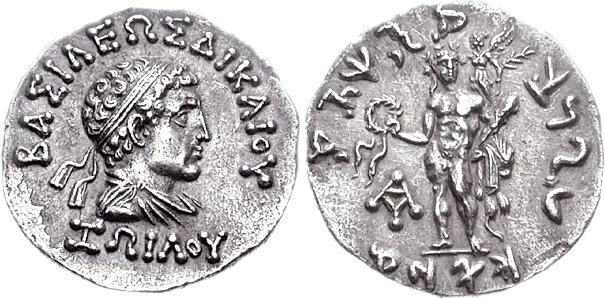
Silver coin of Zoilus I. Obverse shows the King wearing royal diadem, with Greek legend: ΒΑΣΙΛΕΩΣ ΔΙΚΑΙΟΥ ΖΩΙΛΟΥ, Basileōs Dikaiou Zōilou, "Of King Zoilus the Just". Reverse with standing Heracles, holding wreath, and Kharosthi legend: Maharajasa Dhramikasa Jhoilasa, "Of the Great King Zoilus, the Follower of the Dharma".

Zoilus I Dicaeus (Ancient Greek: Ζωΐλος Δίκαιος, romanized: Zōïlos Díkaios; epithet means "the Just") was an Indo-Greek king who ruled in Afghanistan and Pakistan, and occupied the areas of the Paropamisade and Arachosia previously held by Menander I. He may have belonged to the dynasty of Euthydemus I.

== Time of reign ==
Zoilus used to be dated after the death of Menander, c. 130–120 BC (Bopearachchi). Two coins of Zoilus I were however overstruck by Menander I, so Zoilus came to power while Menander was still alive and was perhaps his enemy. R. C. Senior has suggested some time between 150 and 135 BC.

== Coin types of Zoilos I ==
Zoilus I uses a silver coin type similar to that of Euthydemus II, son of Demetrius: Crowned Herakles standing, holding a wreath or diadem in his right hand, and a club and the lion skin in his left hand. On some of the coins, which are of lower artistic quality, Herakles is crowned by a small Nike. Zoilus I also struck rare gold-plated silver coins with portrait and Heracles.

In place of his Greek epithet "the just", Zoilus' Indian-standard coins bear the Pali title Dhramikasa ("Follower of the Dharma"), probably related to Buddhism. This is the first time this epithet appears on Indo-Greek coinage. A few monolingual Attic tetradrachms of Zoilos I have been found. Zoilus inherited (or took) several monograms from Menander I. In Pali language, written in Kharoshti script, his name was written as either Jhoila or Jhahila (transliterated), as the Z sound was foreign to Pali (see 'Catalog of the coins of Zoilus I' link below).

His bronze coins are square and original in that they combine the club of Heracles with a Scythian-type bowcase (for a short recurve bow) inside a victory wreath, suggesting contacts or even an alliance with horse-mounted people originating from the steppes, possibly either the Scythians (future Indo-Scythians), or the Yuezhi who had invaded Greco-Bactria. This bow can be contrasted to the traditional Hellenistic long bow depicted on the coins of the eastern Indo-Greek queen Agathokleia.

== Gallery ==
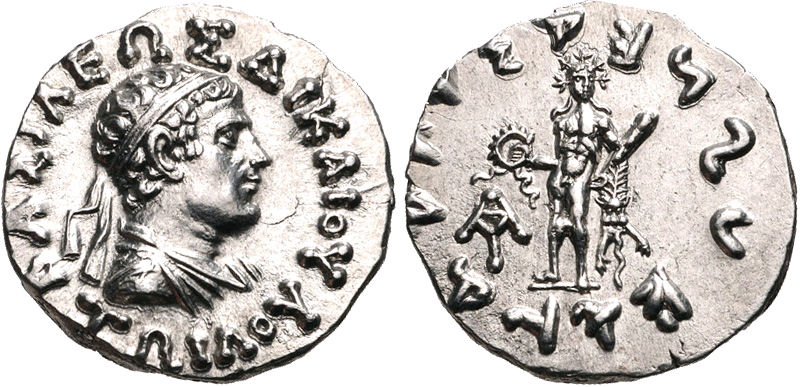
Silver coin of Zoilus I. Obverse shows the King wearing royal diadem, with Greek legend: ΒΑΣΙΛΕΩΣ ΔΙΚΑΙΟΥ ΖΩΙΛΟΥ, Basileōs Dikaiou Zōilou, "Of King Zoilus the Just". Reverse with standing Heracles, and Kharosthi legend: Maharajasa Dhramikasa Jhoilasa, "Of the Great King Zoilus, the Follower of the Dharma".

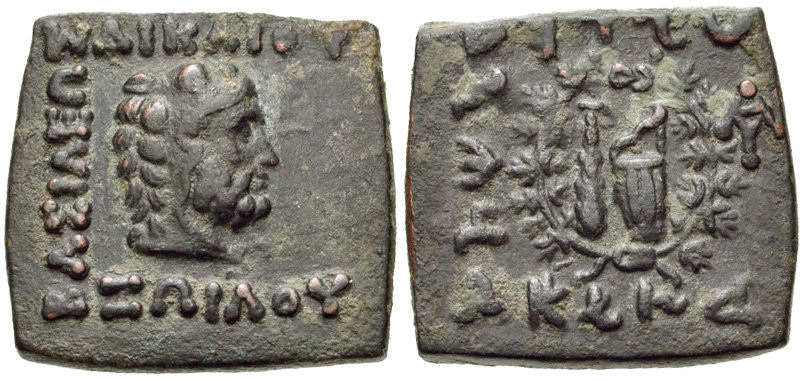
Indian square coin of Zoilus I. The obverse shows the head of Heracles, with Greek legend. The reverse shows the Heraclean club and the Scythian bow, within a circular wreath, with Kharosthi legend on the outside.

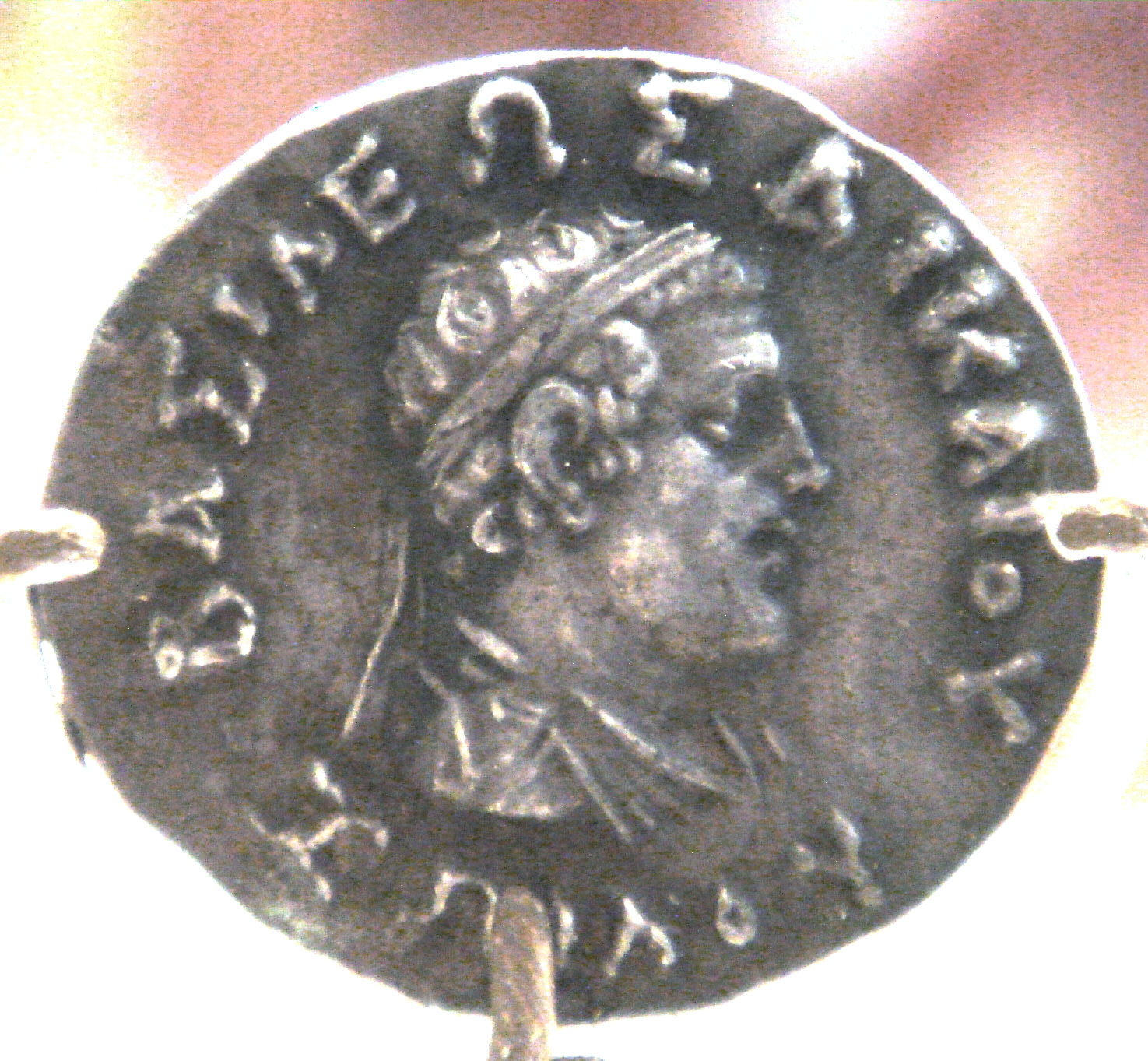
Another silver coin of Zoilus I. The Obverse, showing the King wearing a royal diadem, and with the Greek legend: ΒΑΣΙΛΕΩΣ ΔΙΚΑΙΟΥ ΖΩΙΛΟΥ, Basileōs Dikaiou Zōilou, "Of King Zoilus the Just".

== See also ==
- Indo-Greek Kingdom
- Greco-Buddhism
- Indo-Scythians

== Notes ==
Preceded by Heliocles	Indo-Greek king (in Paropamisadae, Arachosia); 130 – 120 BC	Succeeded by Lysias

	Greco-Bactrian kings		Indo-Greek kings					
Territories/ dates	West Bactria	East Bactria	Paropamisade	Arachosia	Gandhara	Western Punjab	Eastern Punjab	Mathura
326-325 BCE	Campaigns of Alexander the Great in India						Nanda Empire	
312 BCE	Creation of the Seleucid Empire						Creation of the Maurya Empire	
305 BCE	Seleucid Empire after Mauryan war		Maurya Empire					
280 BCE	Foundation of Ai-Khanoum							
255–239 BCE	Independence of the Greco-Bactrian kingdom Diodotus I		Emperor Ashoka (268-232 BCE)					
239–223 BCE	Diodotus II							
230–200 BCE	Euthydemus I							
200–190 BCE	Demetrius I				Sunga Empire			
190-185 BCE	Euthydemus II							
190–180 BCE	Agathocles			Pantaleon				
185–170 BCE	Antimachus I							
180–160 BCE			Apollodotus I					
175–170 BCE	Demetrius II							
160–155 BCE			Antimachus II					
170–145 BCE	Eucratides I							
155–130 BCE	Yuezhi occupation, loss of Ai-Khanoum	Eucratides II; Plato; Heliocles I	Menander I					
130–120 BCE	Yuezhi occupation		Zoilus I		Agathoclea			Yavanarajya inscription
120–110 BCE			Lysias		Strato I			Yavanarajya inscription
110–100 BCE			Antialcidas		Heliocles II			Yavanarajya inscription
100 BCE			Polyxenus		Demetrius III			Yavanarajya inscription
100–95 BCE			Philoxenus					Yavanarajya inscription
95–90 BCE			Diomedes	Amyntas		Epander		Yavanarajya inscription
90 BCE			Theophilus	Peucolaus		Thraso		Yavanarajya inscription
90–85 BCE			Nicias	Menander II		Artemidorus		Yavanarajya inscription
90–70 BCE			Hermaeus	Archebius				Yavanarajya inscription
			Yuezhi occupation		Maues (Indo-Scythian)			
75–70 BCE				Vonones	Telephus	Apollodotus II		
65–55 BCE				Spalirises		Hippostratus	Dionysius	
55–35 BCE					Azes I (Indo-Scythians)		Zoilus II	
55–35 BCE					Vijayamitra/ Azilises		Apollophanes	
25 BCE – 10 CE				Gondophares	Zeionises	Kharahostes	Strato II; Strato III	
				Gondophares (Indo-Parthian)			Rajuvula (Indo-Scythian)	
			Kujula Kadphises (Kushan Empire)				Bhadayasa (Indo-Scythian)	Sodasa (Indo-Scythian)
