= Thraso =

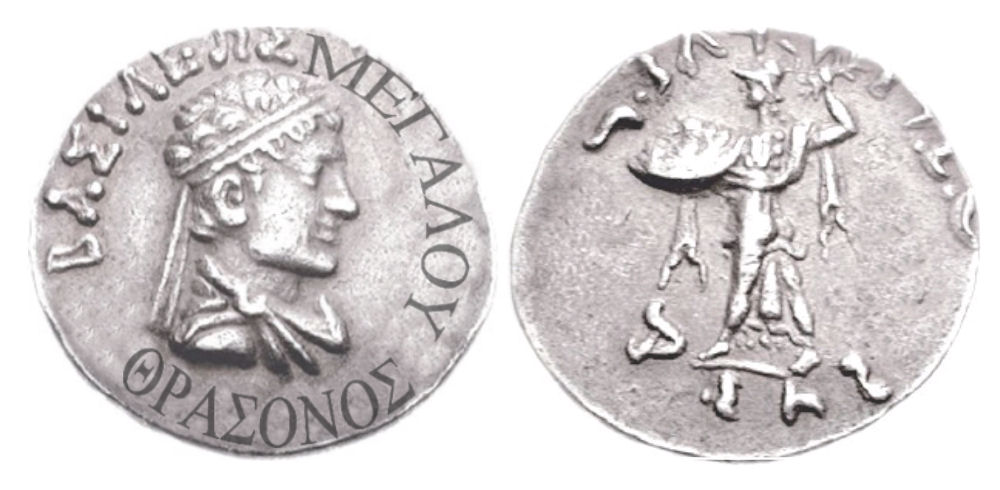
- Simulation of Thraso coin based on description by Bopearachchi, 1991 (actual coin image non published). Obv: Diademed king to the right, with coat attached on right shoulder. Greek Legend: ΒΑΣΙΛΕΩΣ ΜΕΓΑΛΟΥ ΘΡΑΣΟΝΟΣ; Rev: Athena Alkidemos moving to the left, left arm holding a horizontal shield, right arm holding thunderbolt. Legend Maharajasa mahatasa / Thrasasa

Indo-Greek king
- Reign: 95–80 BC

Thraso (Greek: Θράσων, Thrásо̄n) was an Indo-Greek king in Central and Western Punjab.

== Coinage ==
He was unknown until the 1982 discovery of one of his coins by R. C. Senior in the Surana hoard. The coin is in a style similar to those of Menander I, has the same type of Athena, and shares one of Menander's mint marks. On the coin, the title of Thraso is Basileus Megas ("Great King"), a title which only Eucratides the Great had dared take before him and which is seemingly misplaced on the young boy Thraso, whose single preserved coin indicates a small and insignificant reign.

Osmund Bopearachchi suggests a preliminary dating of 95–80 BC, but Senior himself concludes that Thraso was the son and heir of Menander (c. 155–130 BC), since his coin was not worn and was found in a hoard with only earlier coins.

It seems as though the child was briefly raised to the throne in the turmoil following the death of Menander, by a general who thought the grandiloquent title might strengthen his case.

	Greco-Bactrian kings		Indo-Greek kings					
Territories/ dates	West Bactria	East Bactria	Paropamisade	Arachosia	Gandhara	Western Punjab	Eastern Punjab	Mathura
326-325 BCE	Campaigns of Alexander the Great in India						Nanda Empire	
312 BCE	Creation of the Seleucid Empire						Creation of the Maurya Empire	
305 BCE	Seleucid Empire after Mauryan war		Maurya Empire					
280 BCE	Foundation of Ai-Khanoum							
255–239 BCE	Independence of the Greco-Bactrian kingdom Diodotus I		Emperor Ashoka (268-232 BCE)					
239–223 BCE	Diodotus II							
230–200 BCE	Euthydemus I							
200–190 BCE	Demetrius I				Sunga Empire			
190-185 BCE	Euthydemus II							
190–180 BCE	Agathocles			Pantaleon				
185–170 BCE	Antimachus I							
180–160 BCE			Apollodotus I					
175–170 BCE	Demetrius II							
160–155 BCE			Antimachus II					
170–145 BCE	Eucratides I							
155–130 BCE	Yuezhi occupation, loss of Ai-Khanoum	Eucratides II; Plato; Heliocles I	Menander I					
130–120 BCE	Yuezhi occupation		Zoilus I		Agathoclea			Yavanarajya inscription
120–110 BCE			Lysias		Strato I			Yavanarajya inscription
110–100 BCE			Antialcidas		Heliocles II			Yavanarajya inscription
100 BCE			Polyxenus		Demetrius III			Yavanarajya inscription
100–95 BCE			Philoxenus					Yavanarajya inscription
95–90 BCE			Diomedes	Amyntas		Epander		Yavanarajya inscription
90 BCE			Theophilus	Peucolaus		Thraso		Yavanarajya inscription
90–85 BCE			Nicias	Menander II		Artemidorus		Yavanarajya inscription
90–70 BCE			Hermaeus	Archebius				Yavanarajya inscription
			Yuezhi occupation		Maues (Indo-Scythian)			
75–70 BCE				Vonones	Telephus	Apollodotus II		
65–55 BCE				Spalirises		Hippostratus	Dionysius	
55–35 BCE					Azes I (Indo-Scythians)		Zoilus II	
55–35 BCE					Vijayamitra/ Azilises		Apollophanes	
25 BCE – 10 CE				Gondophares	Zeionises	Kharahostes	Strato II; Strato III	
				Gondophares (Indo-Parthian)			Rajuvula (Indo-Scythian)	
			Kujula Kadphises (Kushan Empire)				Bhadayasa (Indo-Scythian)	Sodasa (Indo-Scythian)

== Notes ==
Preceded by Epander	Indo-Greek Ruler (in Punjab) c. 130 BCE	Succeeded by Artemidoros Aniketos
