= Ancient Orient Museum =

Coordinates: 35.728534°N 139.720785°E

- 古代オリエント博物館

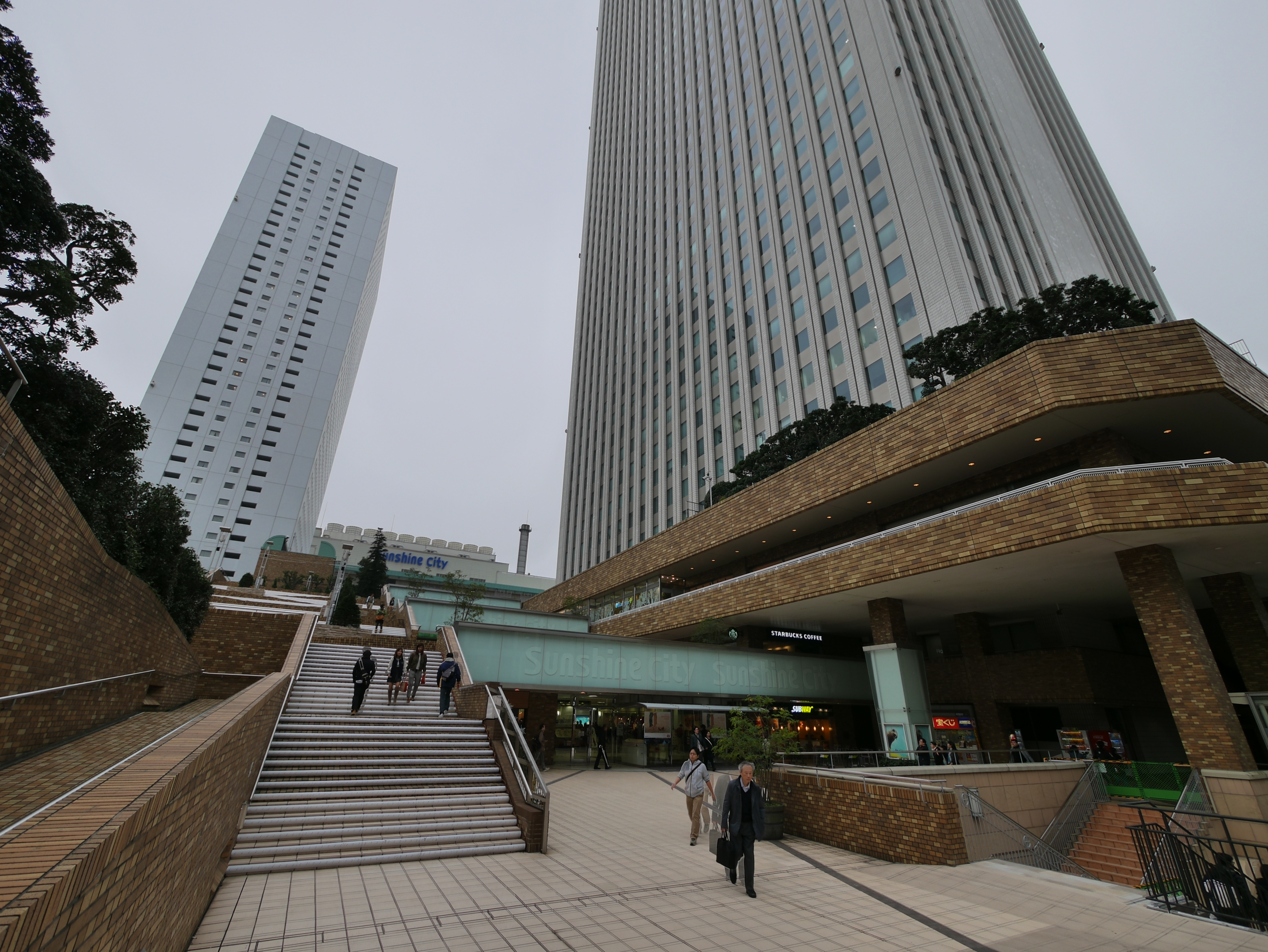
- The Ancient Orient Museum is located on the 7th floor of Sunshine City, Tokyo
- Location: Ikebukuro, Tokyo, Japan
- Type: Archaeology museum
- Website: aom-tokyo.com

The Ancient Orient Museum (Japanese: 古代オリエント博物館, Hepburn: Kodai Oriento Hakubutsukan) is a private museum in Tokyo, Japan, specializing in artifacts of the ancient Near East and Central Asia. Its permanent exhibit features a collection of Greco-Buddhist art of Gandhara, and several works of art pertaining to the art of ancient Palmyra and Persia.

== Location ==
The museum is located in the Sunshine City complex in Ikebukuro, on the 7th floor of the Cultural Center (文化会館).

== History ==
The Ancient Orient Museum was opened on 5 October 1978.

== Gallery ==
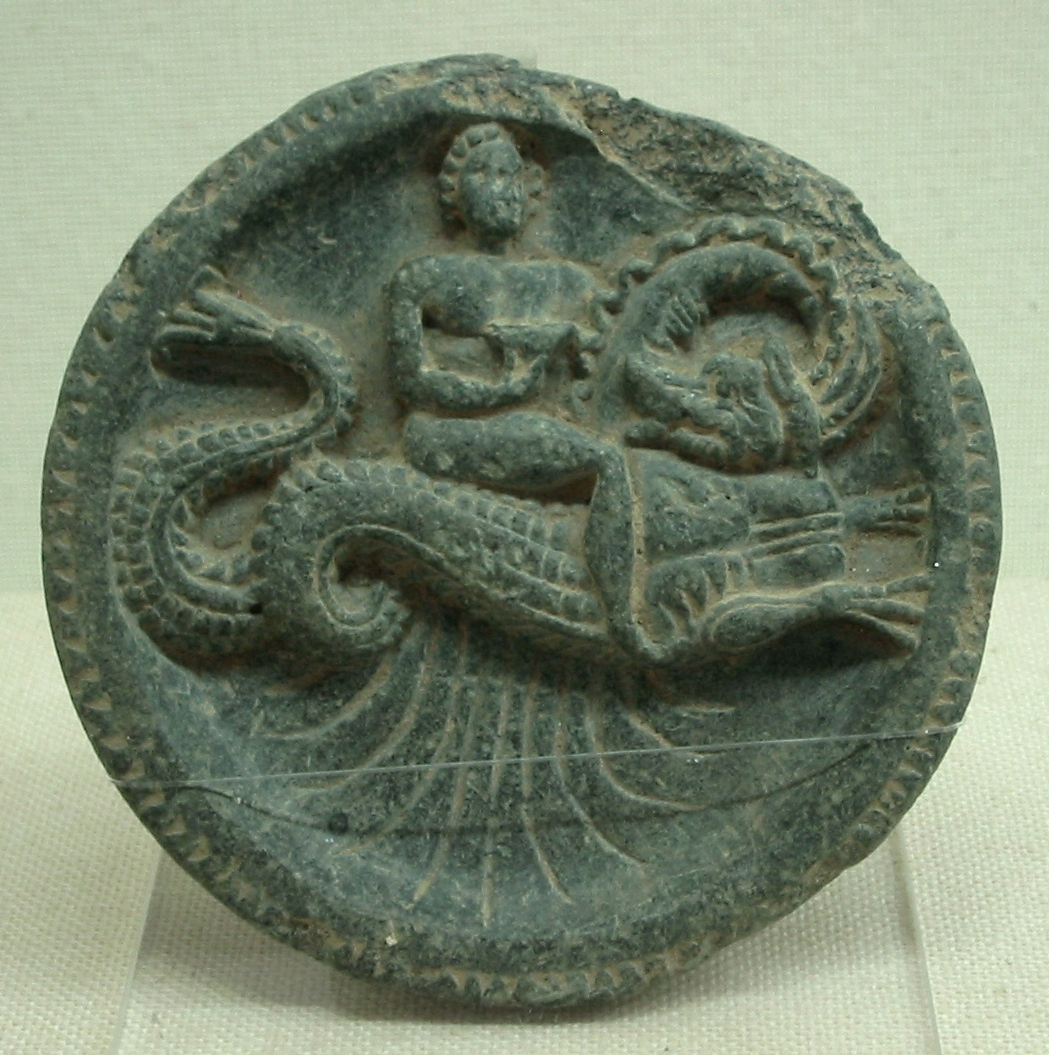
Gandhara stone palette

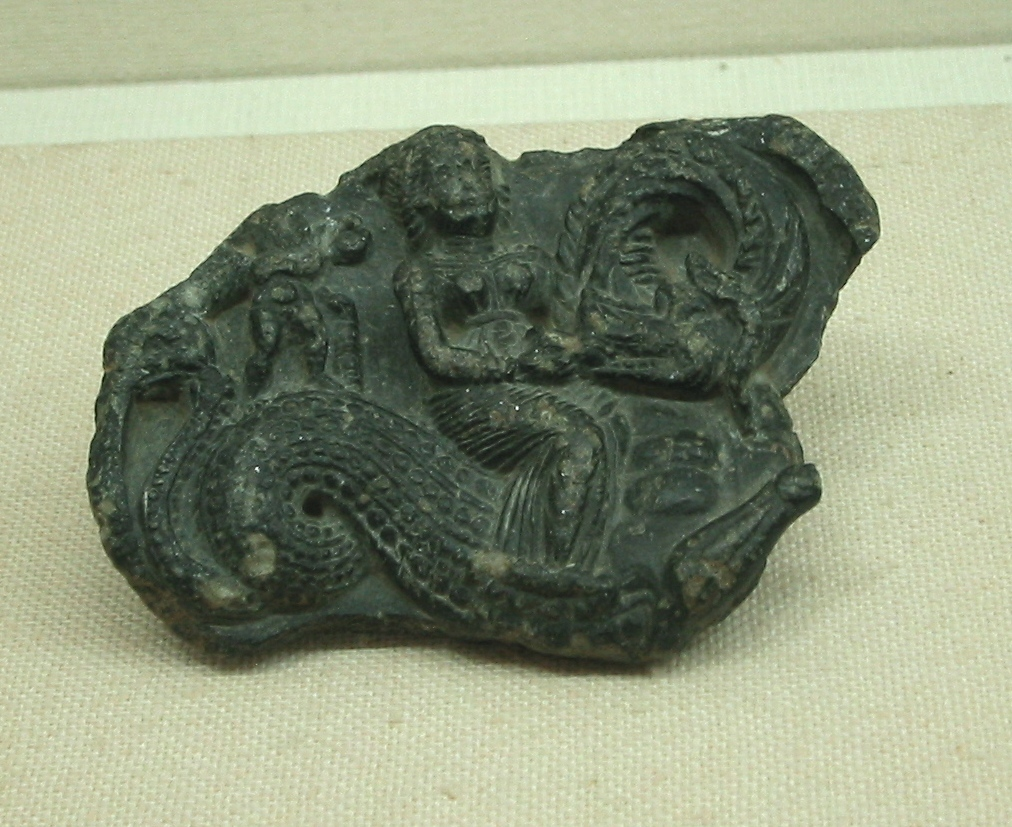
Fragment of a Gandhara stone palette

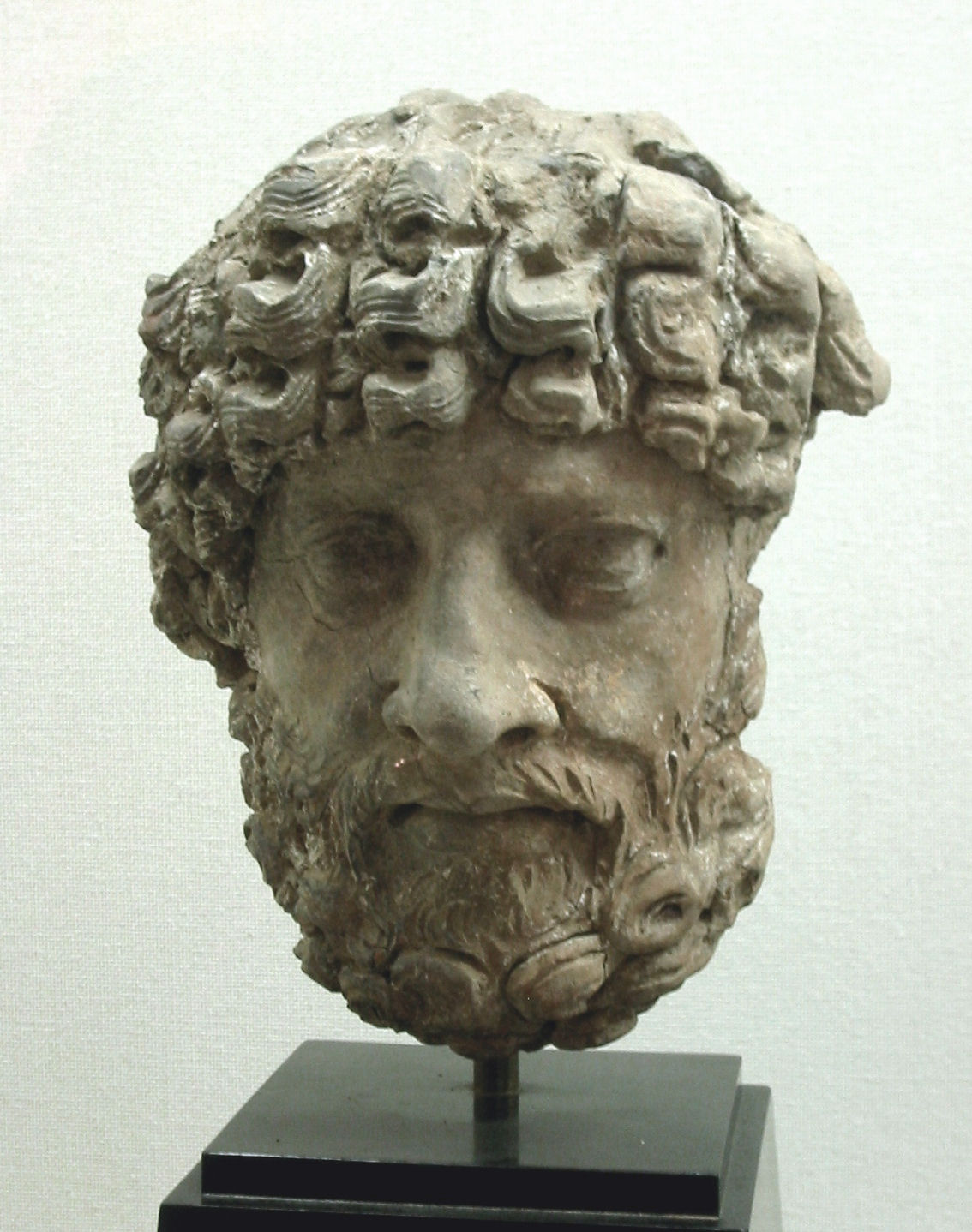
Gandhara Poseidon

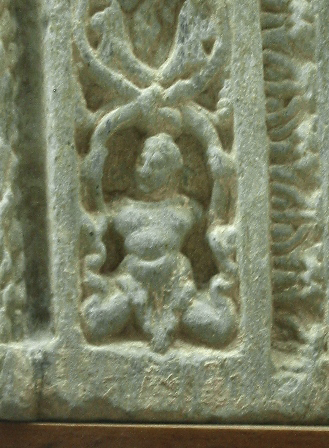
Gandhara Triton

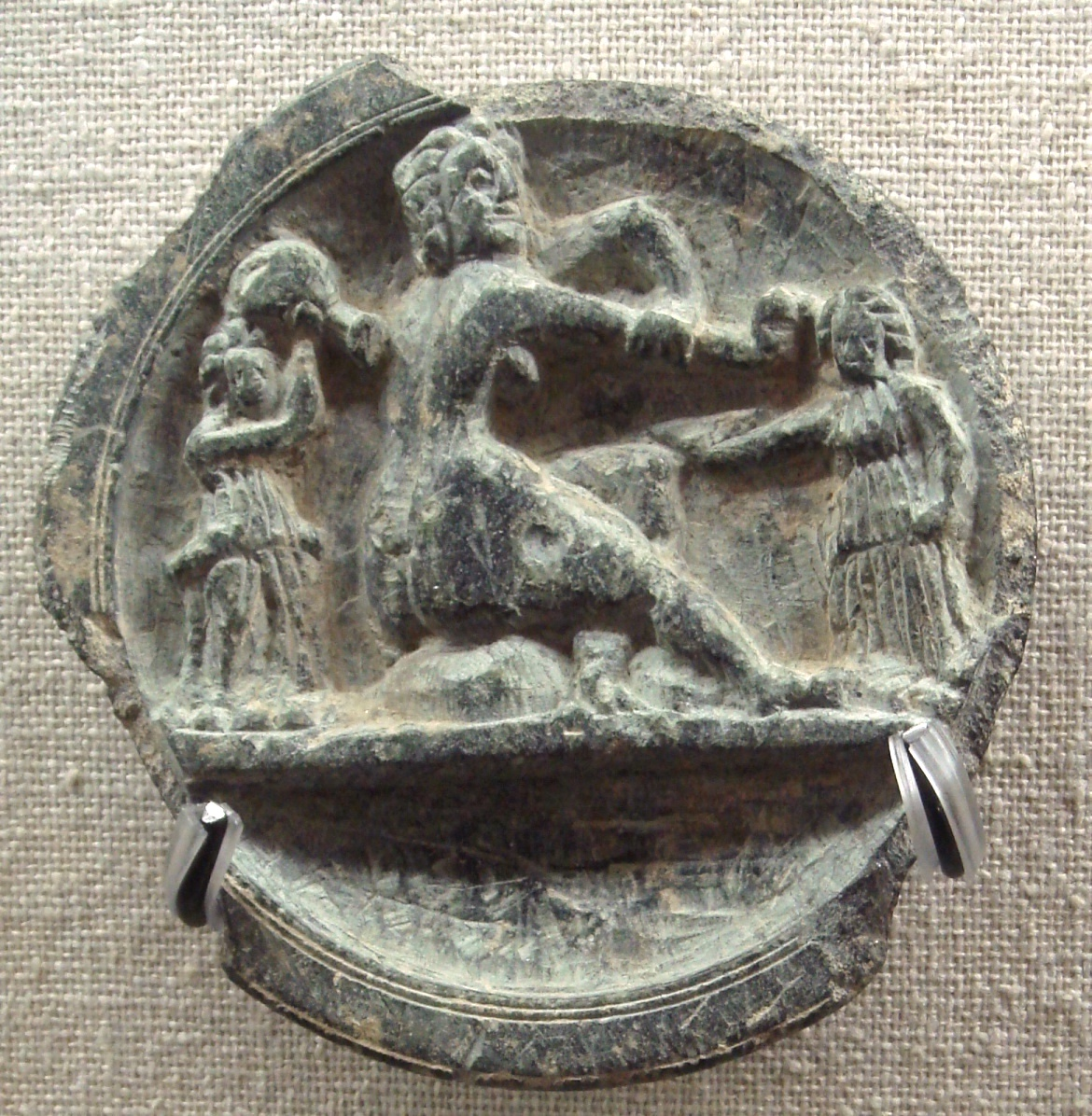
Aphrodite at her bath

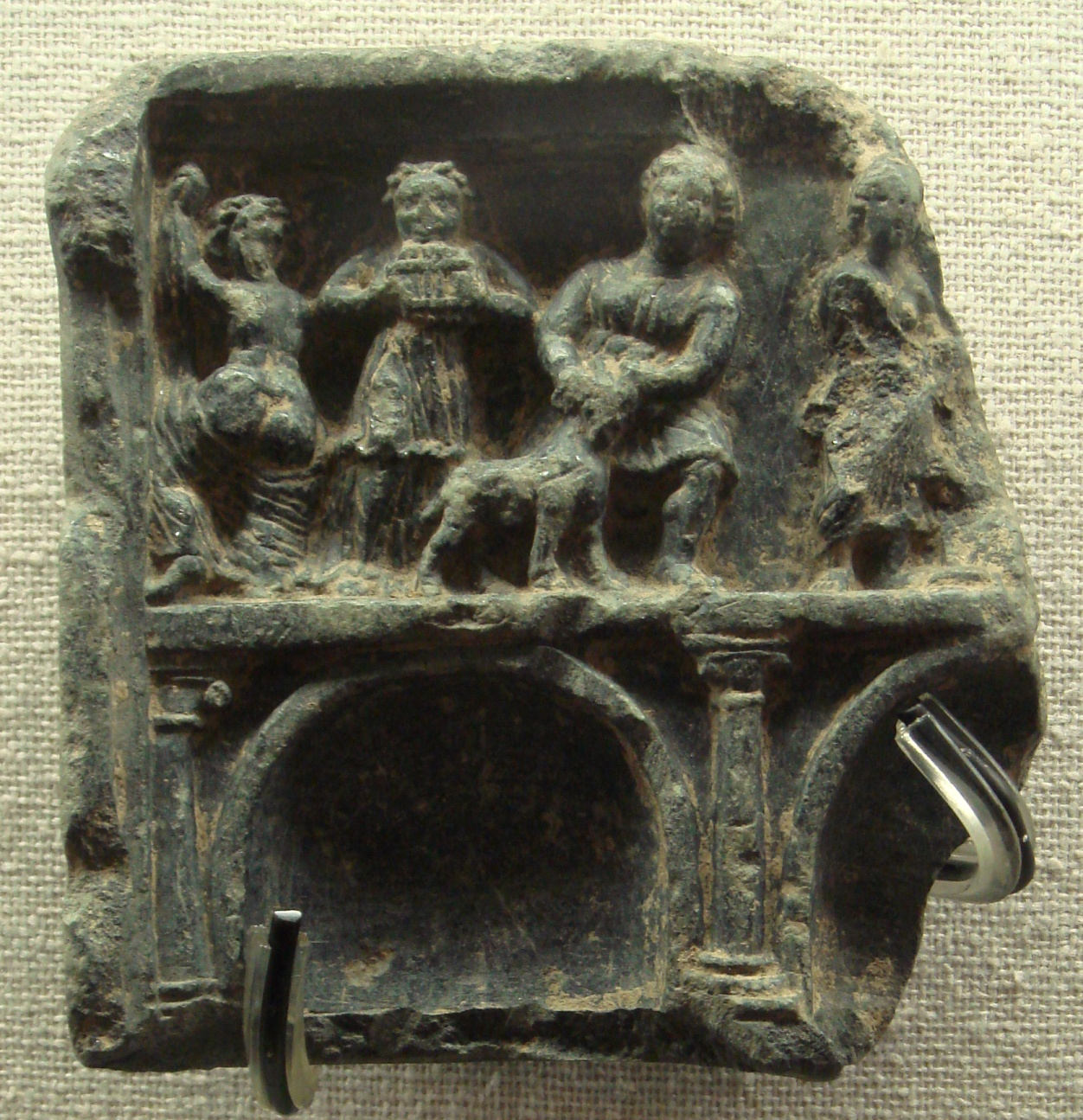
Indo-Greek festivities

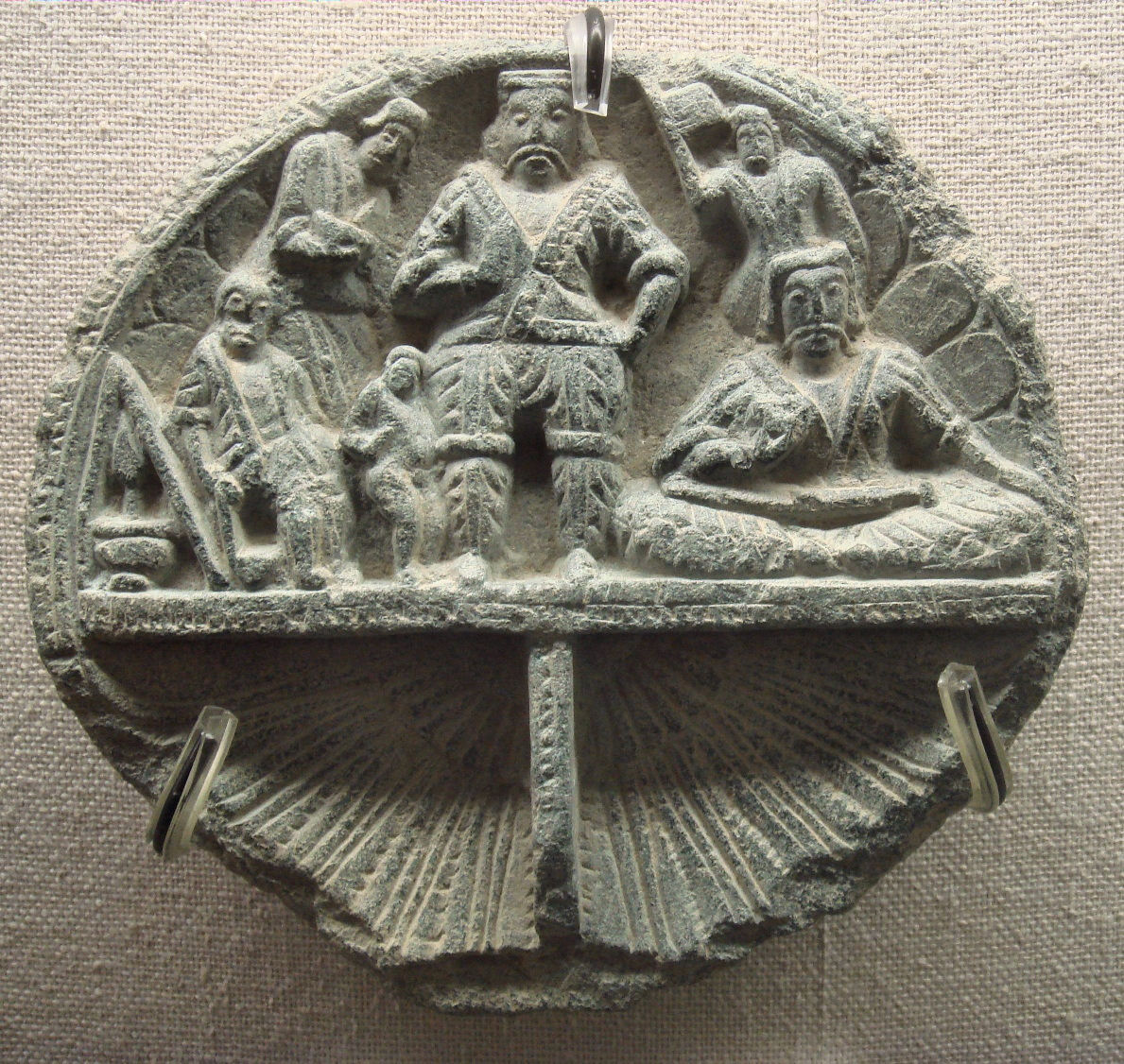
Indo-Parthian king and attendants

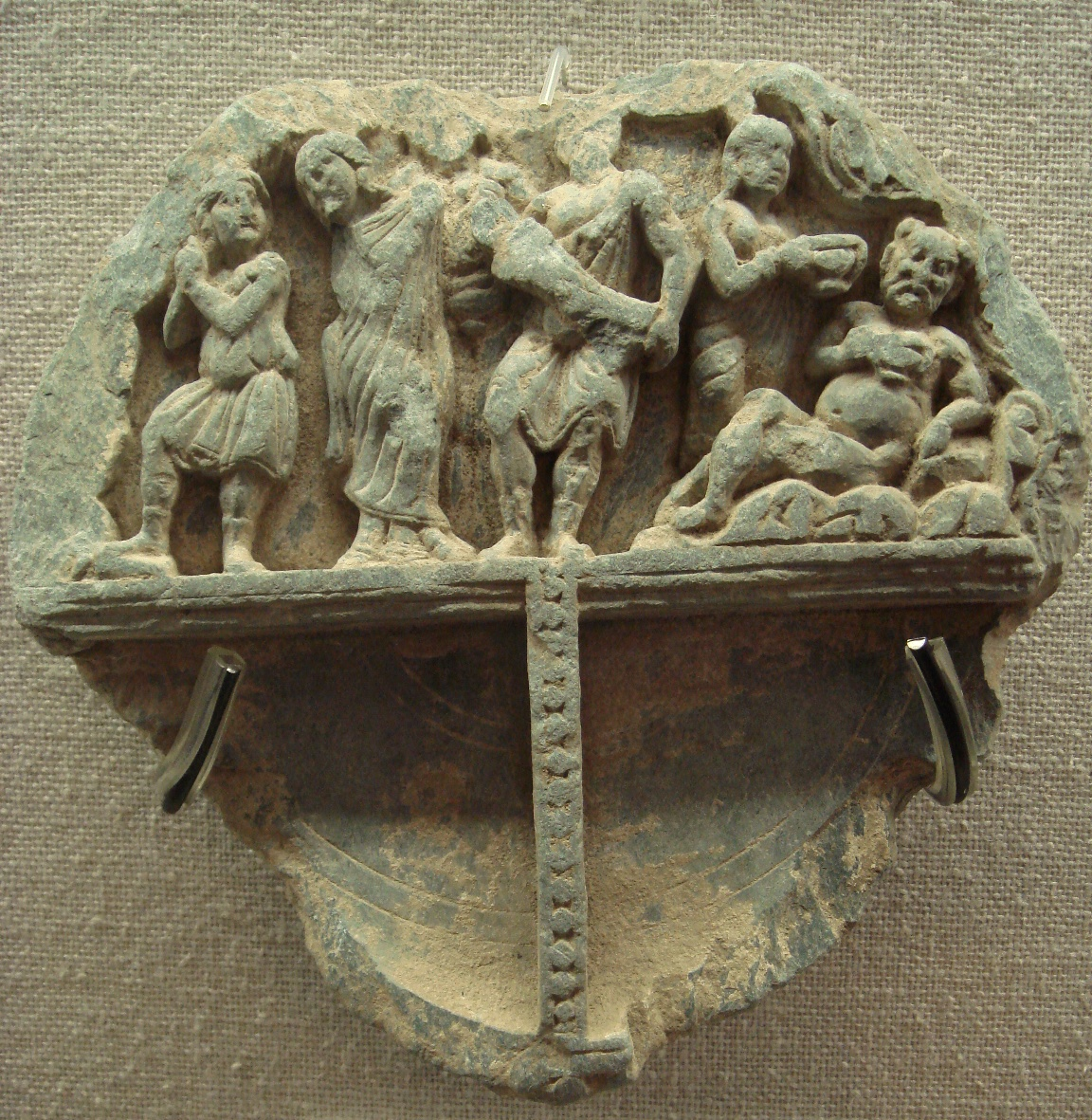
Indo-Greek drinking party

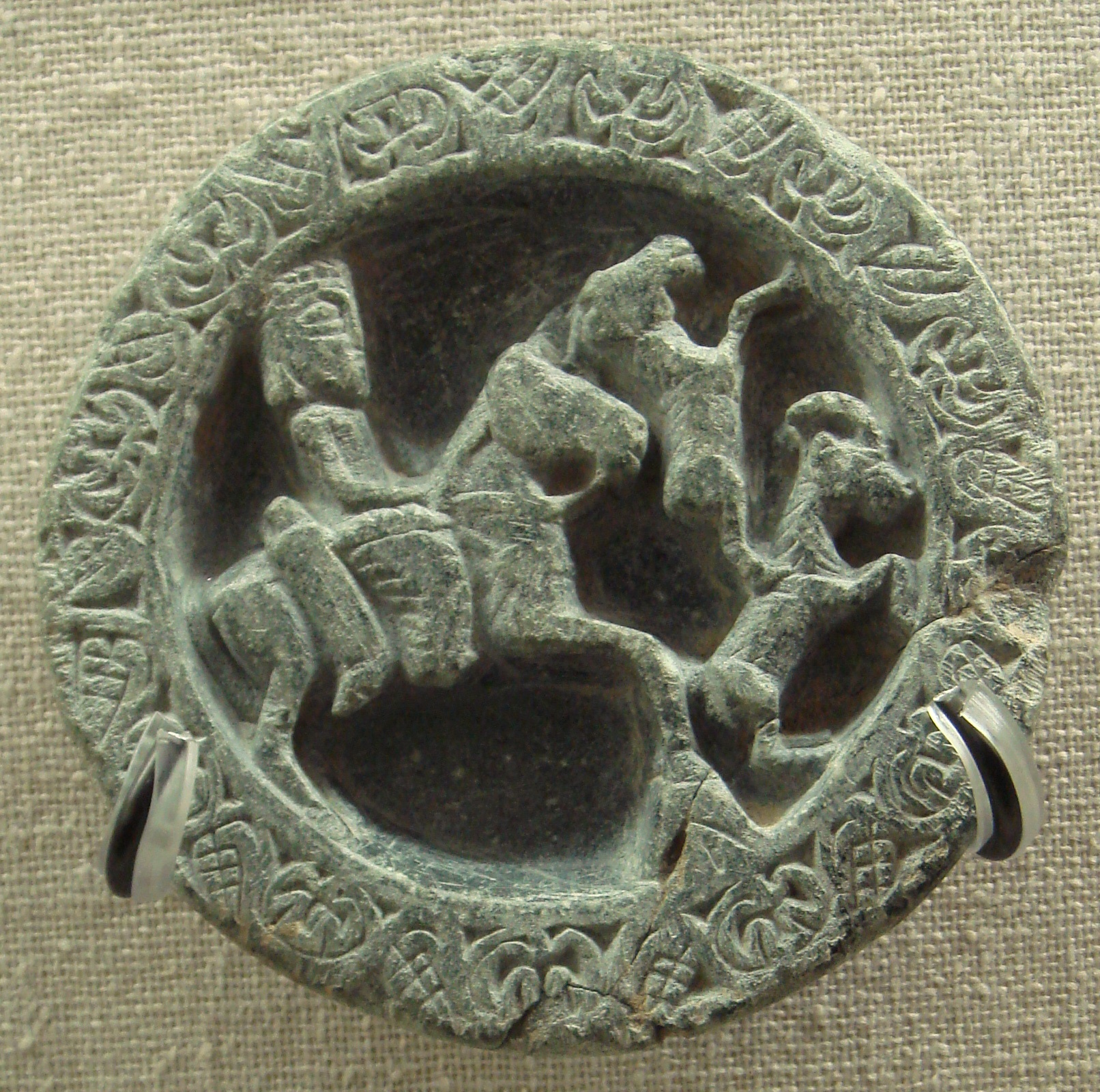
Indo-Parthian man hunting

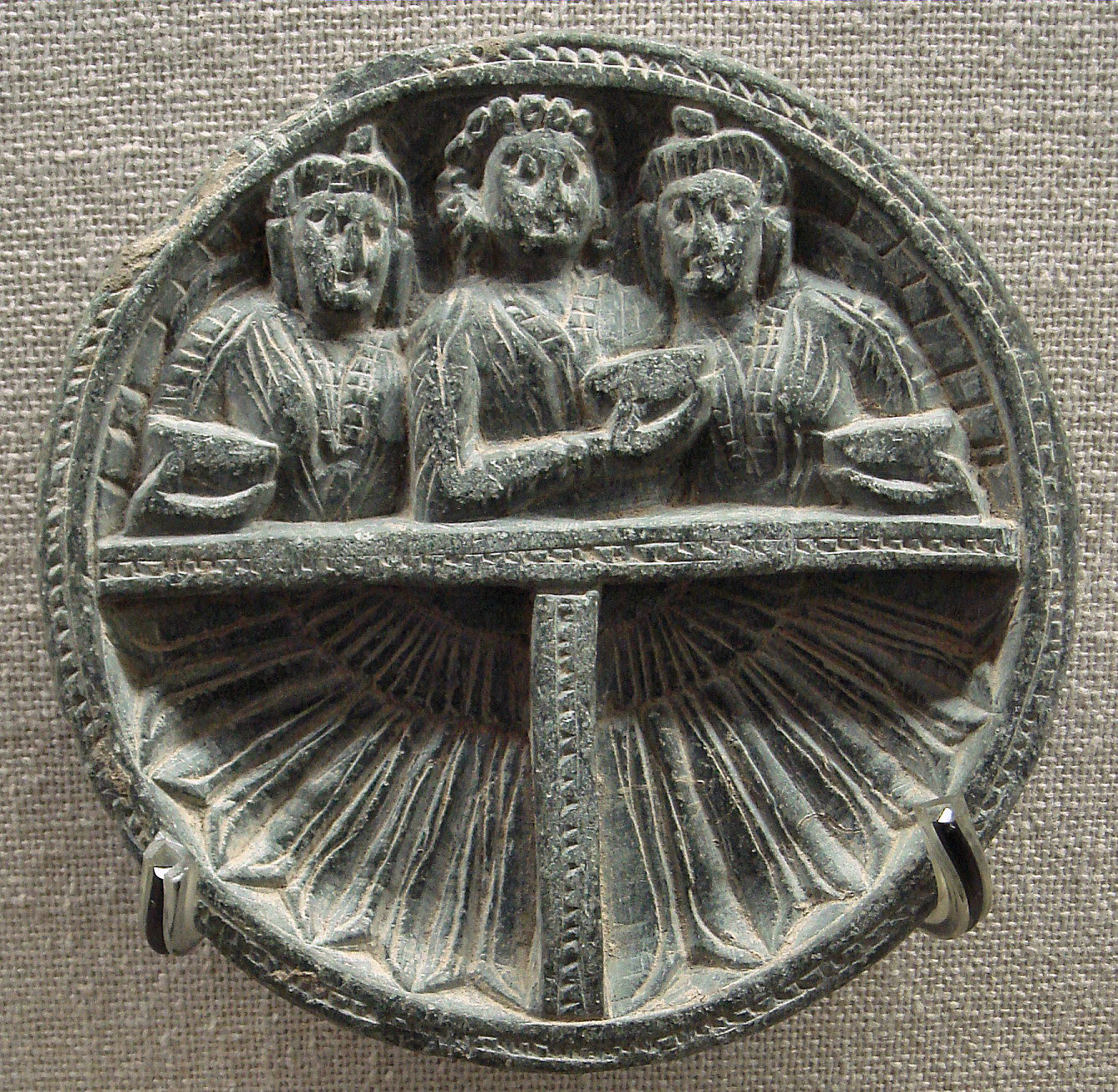
Indo-Parthian revelers

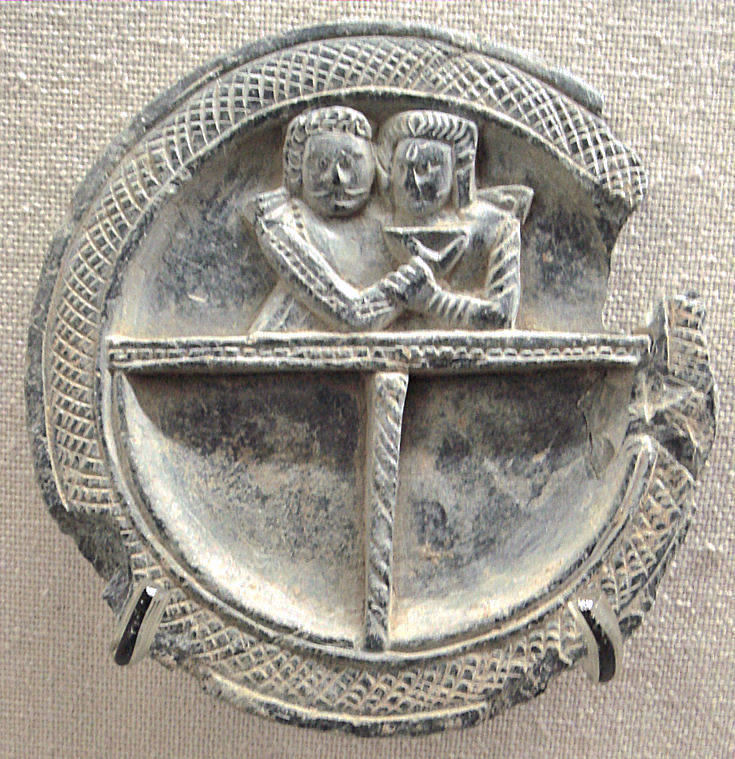
Indo-Parthian couple

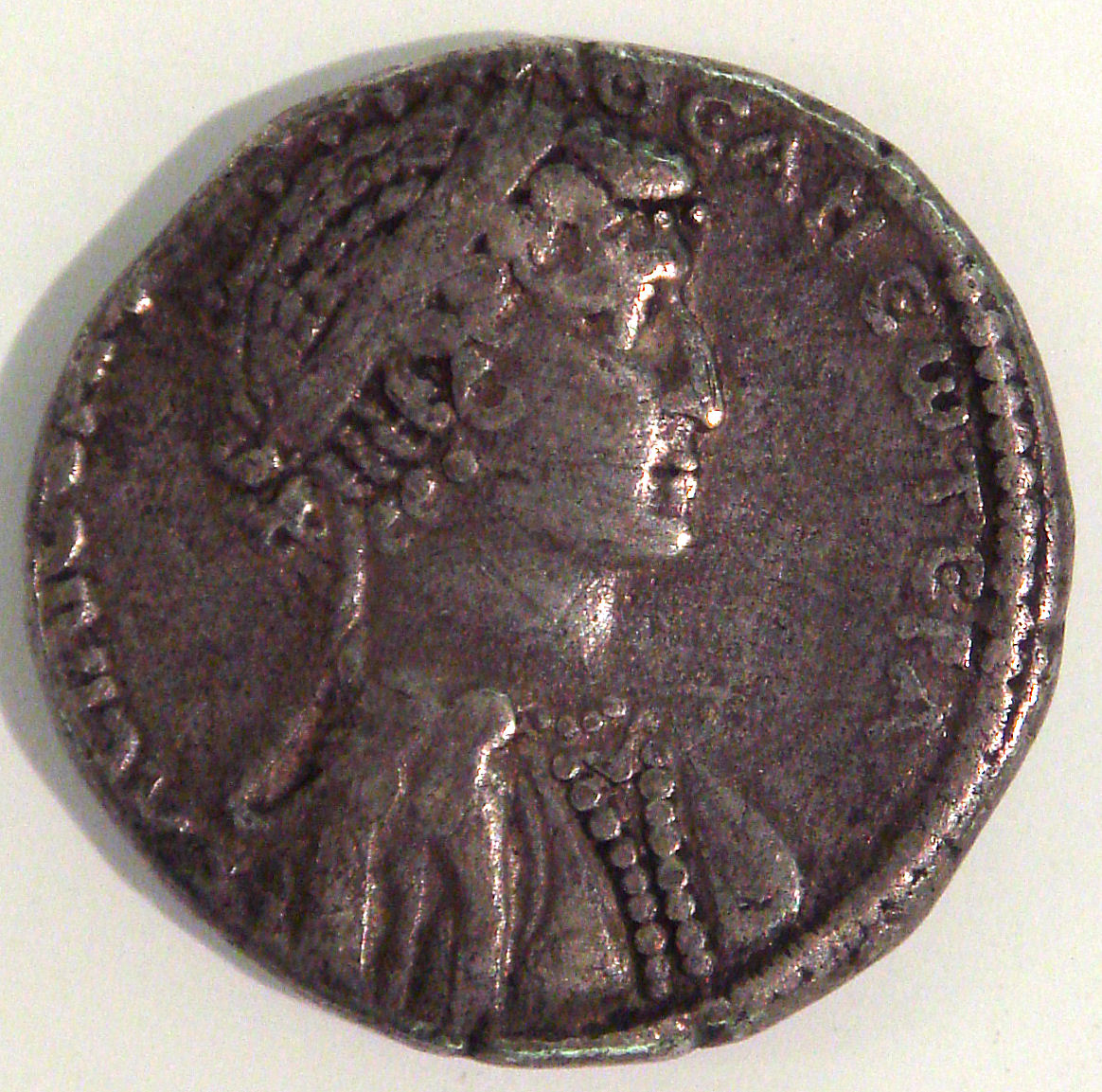
Coin of Cleopatra VII

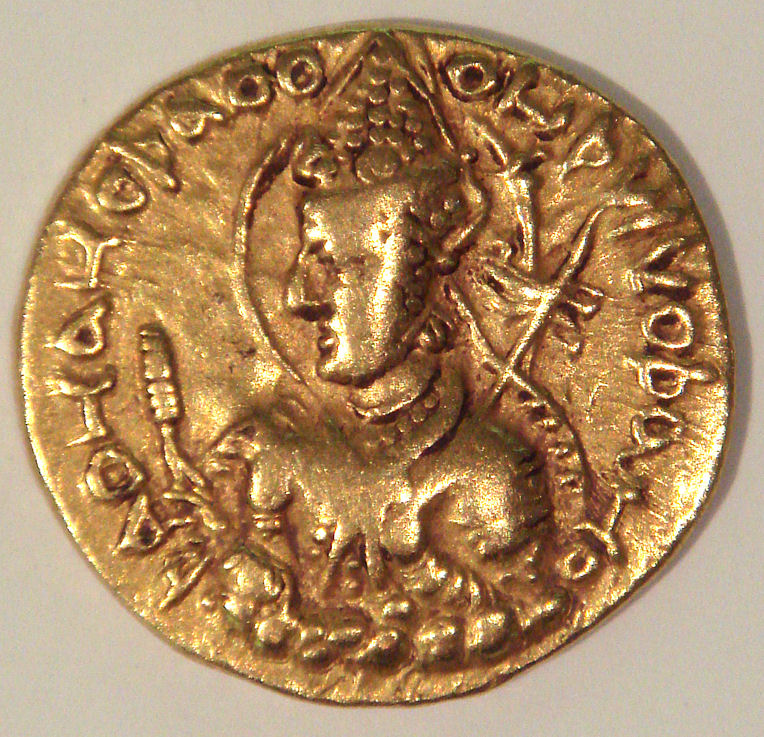
Coin of Huvishka

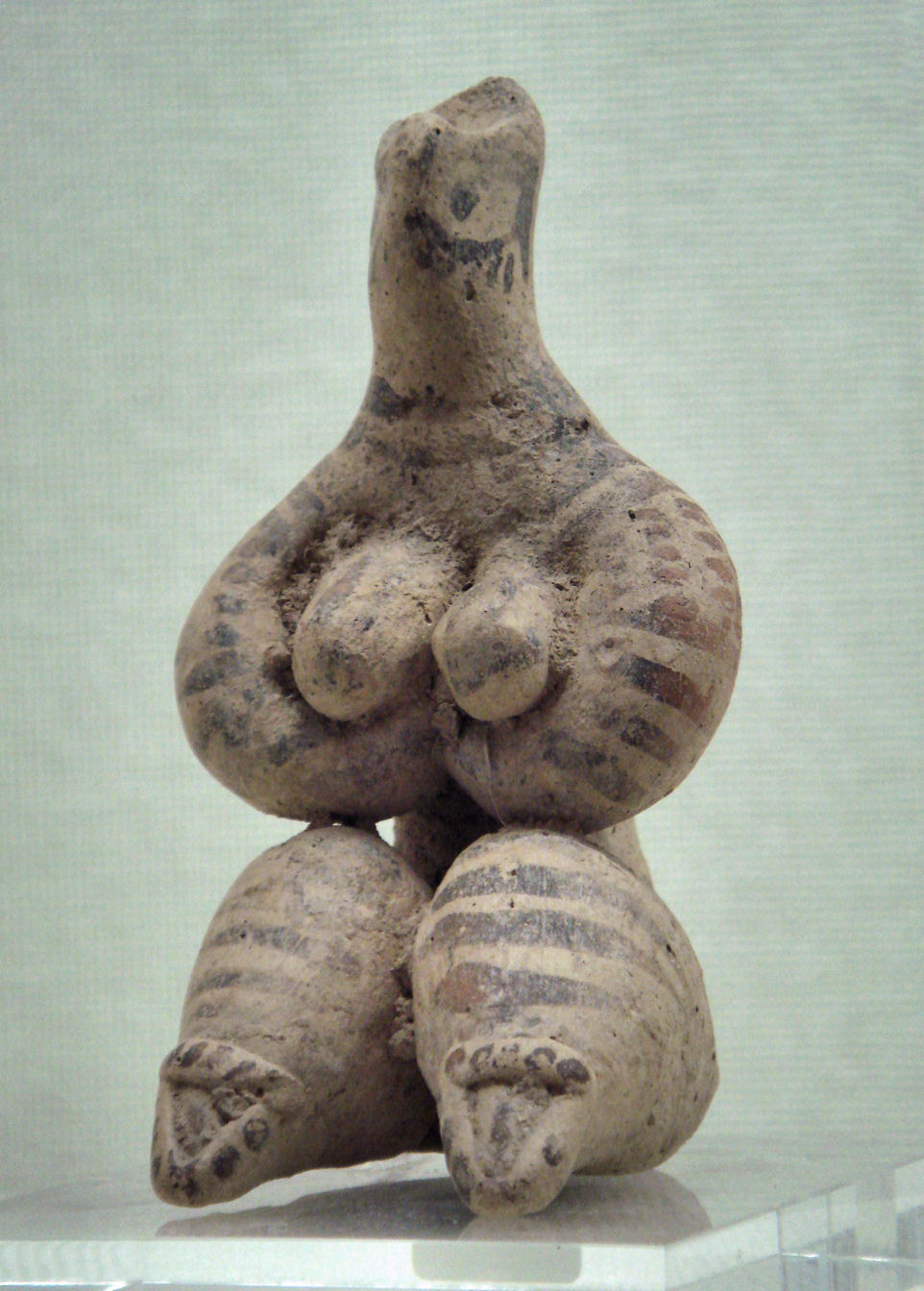
Female figurine, Syria, 5000 BCE

== See also ==
- List of museums in Tokyo
