= Theodamas =

Indo-Greek ruler in Gandhara

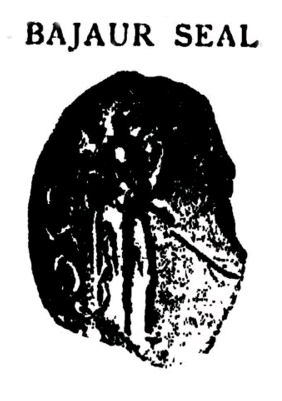
The Bajaur seal, with "Su Theodamasa" inscribed.

Theodamas (fl. 1st century) seems to have been an Indo-Greek ruler in the Bajaur area of Gandhara, in modern Pakistan.

No coins of him are known, but he has left a signet bearing his name in Kharosthi script, which was found in the region of Bajaur.

== Description ==
The inscription on the Seal is "Su Theodamasa", Su being explained as the ubiquitous Kushan royal title Shau ("Shah", "King"), a title which also appeared in its Greek version in the 1st century posthumous issues of the coins of Hermaeus minted by Kujula Kadphises. On these coins the obverse in Greek is Βασιλεος Στιρος Συ Ερμαιοι—Basileos Stiros Su Ermaioi, "Saviour King, Shah Hermaeus", which is translated on the reverse in Kharoshthi as Maharajasa Rajarajasa Mahatasa Heramayasa, "The Great King, the King of Kings, the Great Hermaeus".

Although after 50 BCE Indo-Greek rulers were replaced by the Indo-Scythians and then the Indo-Parthians, Greek culture was maintained to some extent (as indicated by the Greek-style coin types adopted by the conquerors, and the development of Greco-Buddhist art).

It seems some Greek communities and cities also maintained some level of independence (although they did not have the right to issue coinage), and Theodamas may have been one of their local rulers.

== See also ==
- Greco-Bactrian Kingdom
- Seleucid Empire
- Greco-Buddhism
- Indo-Scythians
- Indo-Parthian Kingdom
- Kushan Empire

== Sources ==
- The Greeks in Bactria and India, W.W. Tarn, Cambridge University Press
