= Osmund Bopearachchi =

Sri Lankan historian and numismatist

Emeritus Director of the CNRS at the École normale supérieure Adjunct Professor of Central and South Asian Art, Archaeology, and Numismatics, University of California, Berkeley.
Born: April 12th, 1949

Osmund Bopearachchi (Note: Sinhala: ඔස්මන්ඩ් බෝපේආරච්චි) (born 1949) is a Sri Lankan-French historian and numismatist who has specialized notably standardized the coinage of the Indo-Greek and Greco-Bactrian kingdoms. He is currently Emeritus Director of the CNRS at the École normale supérieure and Adjunct Professor of Central and South Asian Art, Archaeology, and Numismatics, University of California, Berkeley.

== Background ==
Originally from Sri Lanka, Professor Bopearachchi received his Bachelor of Arts (General) Degree from the University of Kelaniya. In 1983 he joined a team of the CNRS at the École Normale Supérieure to further his studies. He received his Ph.D. in Art History and Archaeology from the Institute of Art and Archaeology at the Sorbonne University Paris I in 1987. In 1998, he completed his Habilitation at the Université de Paris-Sorbonne (Paris IV).

== Academic career ==
In 1989, he became Research Specialist (Chargé de Recherche) at CNRS. In 1991, Osmund Bopearachchi published an extensive work on Indo-Greek and Greco-Bactrian coinage, Monnaies gréco-bactriennes et indo-grecques. Catalogue raisonné (400 pages), which became the reference in its field. His conclusions are based on extensive numismatic analysis (find places, overstrikes, monograms, metallurgy, styles), classical writings, and Indian writings and epigraphic evidence. The book received the Prix Mendel (Mendel prize) for Historical Research in 1992.

== Books ==
- O. Bopearachchi, Monnaies gréco-bactriennes et indo-grecques, Catalogue raisonné, Bibliothèque Nationale, Paris, 1991, 459 p., 69 pl.
- O. Bopearachchi, Catalogue of Indo-Greek, Indo-Scythian and Indo-Parthian Coins of the Smithsonian Institution, Washington D.C., 1993, 140 p., 41 pl.
- O. Bopearachchi & A. ur Rahman, Pre-Kushana Coins in Pakistan, Iftikhar Rasul IRM Associates (Pvt.) Ltd., Karachi, 1995. 237 p., 76 pl.
- O. Bopearachchi & W. Pieper, Ancient Indian Coins, Brépols, Turnhout, Belgique, 1998, Indicopleustoi, vol. 11, 289 p., 59 pl.
- O. Bopearachchi, Sylloge Nummorum Graecorum. Graeco-Bactrian and Indo-Greek Coins. The Collection of the American Numismatic Society, Part 9, New York, 1998, 94 p., 76 pl.
- O. Bopearachchi & R.M. Wickremesinhhe, Ruhuna. An Ancient Civilisation Re-visited. Numismatic and Archaeological Evidence on Inland and Maritime Trade, 1999, Colombo, 140 p., 3 maps, 36 pl.
- O. Bopearachchi, An Indo-Greek and Indo-Scythian Coin Hoard from Bara (Pakistan), Seattle, 2003, 104 p. 33 pls.
- O. Bopearachchi & Philippe Flandrin, Le Portrait d’Alexandre. Histoire d’une découverte pour l’humanité, Édition du Rocher, Monaco, 2005, 267 p. 8 pls.
- O. Bopearachchi, The Pleasure Gardens of Sigiriya. A New Approach, Godage Book Emporium, Colombo, 2006. p. 80. (Sinhalese translation, Godage Emporium, Colombo, 2008).
