= Timeline of Indo-Greek kingdoms =

Within the Indo-Greek Kingdom there were over 30 kings, often in competition on different territories. Many of them are only known through their coins.

Many of the dates, territories, and relationships between Indo-Greek kings are tentative and essentially based on numismatic analysis (find places, overstrikes, monograms, metallurgy, styles), a few Classical writings, and Indian writings and epigraphic evidence. The following list of kings, dates and territories after the reign of Demetrius is derived from the latest and most extensive analysis on the subject, by Osmund Bopearachchi ("Monnaies Gréco-Bactriennes et Indo-Grecques, Catalogue Raisonné", 1991).

== Eastern territories ==
The descendants of the Greco-Bactrian king Euthydemus invaded northwestern India around 180 BC as far as the Punjab.

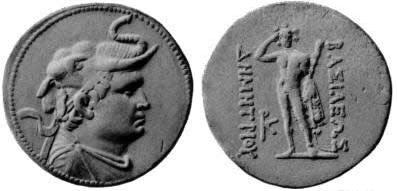
Demetrius I, founder of the Indo-Greek kingdom (r.c. 205-171 BC).

- Demetrius I (reigned c. 200–170 BC) Son of Euthydemus I. Greco-Bactrian king Coins

The territory ruled by Demetrius, from Bactria to Taxila, was then separated between western and eastern parts, and ruled by several sub-kings and successor kings. The Western part made of Bactria was ruled by a succession of Greco-Bactrian kings until the end of the reign of Heliocles around 130 BCE. The Eastern part, made of the Paropamisadae, Arachosia, Gandhara and Punjab, perhaps as far as Mathura, was ruled by a succession of kings, called "Indo-Greek":

=== Territories of Paropamisadae to Mathura (house of Euthydemus) ===
- Agathocles (190-180 BC) Coins
- Pantaleon (190-185 BC)
- Apollodotus I (reigned c. 180–160 BC)
- Antimachus II Nikephoros (160-155 BC)

Coins

- Demetrius II (155-150 BC)

The usurper Eucratides managed to eradicate the Euthydemid dynasty and occupy territory as far as the Indus River, between 170 and 145 BCE. Eucratides was then murdered by his son, thereafter Menander I seems to have regained all of the territory as far west as the Hindu-Kush

=== Territory from Hindu-Kush to Mathura (150 - 125 BCE) ===
- Menander I (reigned c. 150–125 BC). Successor to Apollodotus. Married to Agathocleia. Legendary for the size of his Kingdom, and his support of the Buddhist faith. Coins
- Agathokleia (r.c. 130-125 BCE), Probably widow of Menander, Queen-Mother and regent for her son Strato I. Coins

After the death of Menander I, his successors seem to have been pushed back east to Gandhara, losing the Paropamisadae and Arachosia to a Western Indo-Greek kingdom. Some years later the Eastern kings probably had to retreat even further, to Western Punjab.

=== Territory from Gandhara/Western Punjab to Mathura (125 - 100 BC) ===
- Strato I (125 - 110 BC) Coin, son of Menander and Agathokleia
- Heliokles II (110 - 100 BC) Coins

The following minor kings who ruled parts of the kingdom:

- Polyxenios (c. 100 BC - possibly in Gandhara)
- Demetrius III Aniketos (c. 100 BC).

After around 100 BCE, Indian kings recovered the area of Mathura and Eastern Punjab east of the Ravi River, and started to mint their own coins.

The Western king Philoxenus briefly occupied the whole remaining Greek territory from the Paropamisadae to Western Punjab between 100 and 95 BC, after what the territories fragmented again. The eastern kings regained their territory as far west as Arachosia.

During the 1st century BC, the Indo-Greeks progressively lost ground against the invasion of the Indo-Scythians, until the last king Strato II ended his ruled in Eastern Punjab around 10 CE.

=== Territory of Arachosia and Gandhara (95-70 BCE) ===
- Amyntas Nikator (95 - 90 BC) Coins
- Peukolaos (c. 90 BC)
- Menander II Dikaios "The Just" (90 - 85 BCE) Coins
- Archebios (90 - 80 BC) (with western Punjab) Coins
- (Maues), Indo-Scythian king.
- Artemidoros (c.80 BC) Coins.
- Telephos (75 - 70 BC) Coins

=== Territory of Western Punjab (95-55 BC) ===
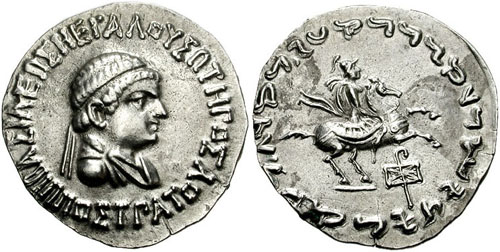
Tetradrachm of Hippostratus, reigned circa 65-55 BCE.

- Epander (95 - 90 BC) Coins
- Archebios (90 - 80 BC) Coins
- (Maues), Indo-Scythian king
- Thraso (around 80 BC or earlier)
- Apollodotus II (80 - 65 BC) (with Eastern Punjab) Coins
- Hippostratos (65 - 55 BC) Coins, defeated by the Indo-Scythian King Azes I.
- (Azes I). Indo-Scythian king.

Around 80 BCE, parts of Eastern Punjab were regained again:

=== Territories of Eastern Punjab (80 BC - 10 AD) ===
- Apollodotus II (80 - 65 BCE)Coins
- Dionysios (65 - 55 BC)
- Zoilos II (55 - 35 BC)
- Apollophanes (35-25 BC)
- Strato II (25 BC - 10 AD) Coin
- (Rajuvula), Indo-Scythian king.

== Western territories ==
The following kings ruled the western parts of the Indo-Greek/Graeco-Bactrian realms, which are here referred to as the "Western kingdom". Probably after the death of Menander I, the Paropamisadae and Arachosia broke loose, and the Western kings eventually seem to have extended into Gandhara by the following kings. Several of its rulers are believed to have belonged to the house of Eucratides.

=== Territories of the Paropamisadae, Arachosia and Gandhara (130 - 95 BC) ===
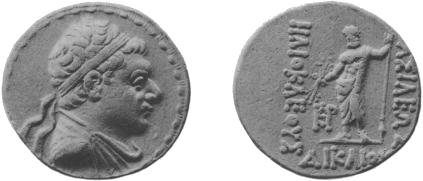
Silver coin of Heliocles (145-130 BC)

- Zoilos I (130 - 120 BC´), revolted against the dynasty of Menander.Coins
- Lysias (120 - 110 BC), probably conquered Gandhara for the Western kingdom. Coins
- Antialcidas (r.c. 115-95 BC) Coins
- Philoxenus (reigned c. 100- 95 BCE) Coins. Philoxenus ruled in western Punjab as well.

After the death of Philoxenus, the Western kingdom fragmented and never became dominating again. The following kings ruled mostly in the Paropamisadae.

=== Territory of the Paropamisadae (95-70 BC) ===
- Diomedes (95 - 90 BC)Coin
- Theophilos (c. 90 BC) Coin
- Nicias (reigned c. 90–85 BC
- Hermaeus (reigned c. 90–70 BC).
- (Yuezhi rulers)

The Yuezhi probably then took control of the Paropamisadae after Hermaeus. The first documented Yuezhi prince, Sapadbizes, ruled around 20 BCE, and minted in Greek and in the same style as the western Indo-Greek kings, probably depending on Greek mints and celators. The Yuezhi expanded to the east during the 1st century CE, to found the Kushan Empire. The first Kushan emperor Kujula Kadphises ostensibly associated himself with Hermaeus on his coins, suggesting that he may have been one of his descendants by alliance, or at least wanted to claim his legacy.

== Indo-Greek princelets (Gandhara) ==
After the Indo-Scythian Kings became the rulers of northern India, remaining Greek communities were probably governed by lesser Greek rulers, without the right of coinage, into the 1st century CE, in the areas of the Paropamisadae and Gandhara:

- Theodamas (c. 1st century CE) Indo-Greek ruler of the Bajaur area, northern Gandhara.

The Indo-Greeks may have kept a significant military role towards the 2nd century CE as suggested by the inscriptions of the Satavahana kings.
