= Euthydemid dynasty =

Hellenistic dynasty

Euthydemid Dynasty
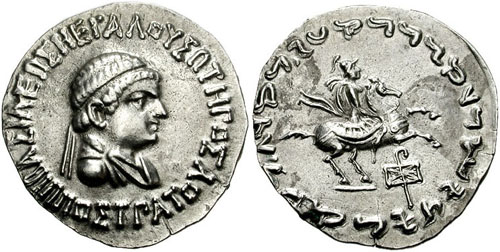
- Coin of the Indo-Greek king Hippostratos.
- Country: Bactria
- Founded: 230 BC
- Founder: Euthydemus I
- Final ruler: Euthydemus II (Bactria); Strato III (India)
- Titles: Basileus, King of Kings

The Euthydemid dynasty was a Hellenistic dynasty founded by Euthydemus I in 230 BC which ruled the Greco-Bactrian and Indo-Greek kingdoms throughout the Hellenistic period from 230 BC to 10 AD, upon the death of its last ruler, Strato III in Gandhara. For the genealogy of this dynasty, see Family tree of the Greco-Bactrian and Indo-Greek kings.

== History ==
Euthydemus was an Ionian-Greek from one of the Magnesias in Ionia, though it is uncertain from which one (Magnesia on the Maeander or Magnesia ad Sipylum), and was the father of Demetrius I, according to Strabo and Polybius. William Woodthorpe Tarn proposed that Euthydemus was the son of a Greek general called Antimachus or Apollodotus, born c. 295 BC, and that he married a sister of the Greco-Bactrian king Diodotus II.

Euthydemus was a satrap of Sogdiana that was married to a sister of Diodotus II, son of the original rebel, Diodotus I. He usurped the throne from Diodotus II or perhaps Antiochus Nikator and became ruler of the Greco-Bactrian Kingdom. Later on in his reign, he faced an invasion by the younger and ambitious Antiochus III the Great. He was defeated on the Arius but successively waited out Antiochus in his capital Bactra. His peace treaty with Antiochus granted his son Demetrius I a marriage to an unspecified daughter of Antiochus.

His son Demetrius I would go on to invade northern India and establish the Indo-Greek kingdom. After Demetrius's sons Agathocles, Euthydemus II and perhaps even Demetrius II rule over the Greco-Bactrian and Indo-Greek kingdoms, it becomes harder to pinpoint which of the following rulers were related to each other, or even if they were members of the Euthydemid dynasty. It is possible however, that the powerful king Menander I was a member of this dynasty.

== Rulers ==
Precise members of this royal family cannot be fully reconstructed due to the lack of evidence and only a remaining vast coinage of following rulers. Demetrius's successor, Agathocles, left behind extensive coinage that helped reconstruct part of the dynasty. Some of the more certain rulers are:

- Euthydemus I (260-195 BC) eponymous founder of the dynasty
- Demetrius I (222-180 BC) most famous of the Euthydemids - invaded India
- Euthydemus II ( c. 200-185 BC) Son of Euthydemus I
- Pantaleon (190-180 BC) Son of Euthydemus I
- Demetrius II (fl. 175-140 BC) Son of Demetrius I
- Antimachus I (c.171-160 BC) Son of Euthydemus I
- Antimachus II (c. 170-165 BC) Son of Antimachus I or Demetrius II
- Menander I (c. 165/155-130 BC) married Agathoclea, father of Strato I
- Agathoclea I (c. 130-125 BC) widow of Menander, ruled as regent for son, Strato I
- Strato I (c. 125-105 BC) son of Menander I and Agathocleia I
- Demetrius III (c. 105-100 BC)
- Amyntas (c. 100-90 BC)
- Menander II (c. 105 BC)
- Demetrius IV (c. 80 BC)
- Strato II (c. 30 BC)
- Strato III (c. 10 AD) last ruler
- Demetrius V (c. 10 AD) ? potential claimant ruler

Following these rulers, it becomes increasingly hard to date or connect them to any family, as they may have been usurpers, but the Euthydemids remained the most constant and long reigning dynasty of Greek Bactria and India.

== See also ==
- Eucratides I
- Seleucid Empire
