= Sources of Indo-Greek history =

The sources which are used to reconstruct the history of the Indo-Greeks are few and disparate, leading to much uncertainty about the precise state of the Indo-Greek Kingdom and its chronology. Sources related to the Indo-Greeks can be classified into various categories: ancient literary sources from both the West and the Indian world, archaeological sources from the general area of present day Pakistan, Kashmir and North Indian states of Punjab, Haryana, Himachal Pradesh, Uttar Pradesh, Bihar, and numismatical sources, which are abundant and well-preserved but often rather cryptic.

== Literary sources ==
=== Western literary sources ===
Some narrative history has survived for most of the Hellenistic world, at least of the kings and the wars; this is lacking for India. The main Greco-Roman source on the Indo-Greeks is Justin, who wrote an anthology drawn from the Roman historian Pompeius Trogus, who in turn wrote, from Greek sources, at the time of Augustus Caesar. Justin tells the parts of Trogus' history he finds particularly interesting at some length; he connects them by short and simplified summaries of the rest of the material. In the process he has left 85% to 90% of Trogus out; and his summaries are held together by phrases like "meanwhile" (eodem tempore) and "thereafter" (deinde), which he uses very loosely. Where Justin covers periods for which there are other and better sources, he has occasionally made provable mistakes. As Tarn and Develin both point out, Justin is not trying to write history in our sense of the word; he is collecting instructive moral anecdotes. Justin does find the customs and growth of the Parthians, which were covered in Trogus' 41st book, quite interesting, and discusses them at length; in the process, he mentions four of the kings of Bactria and one Greek king of India, getting the names of two of them wrong.

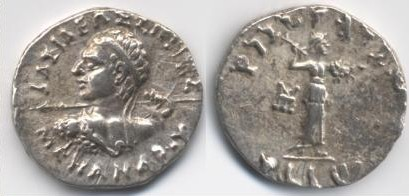
Menander I (155-130 BCE) is one of the few Indo-Greek kings mentioned in both Graeco-Roman and Indian sources.

In addition to these dozen sentences, the geographer Strabo mentions India a few times in the course of his long dispute with Eratosthenes about the shape of Eurasia. Most of these are purely geographical claims, but he does mention that Eratosthenes' sources say that some of the Greek kings conquered further than Alexander; Strabo does not believe them on this, but modern historians do; nor does he believe that Menander and Demetrius son of Euthydemus conquered more tribes than Alexander There is half a story about Bactria (only) in one of the books of Polybius which has not come down to us intact.

In the 1st century BCE, the geographer Isidorus of Charax mentions Parthians ruling over Greek populations and cities in Arachosia: "Beyond is Arachosia. And the Parthians call this White India; there are the city of Biyt and the city of Pharsana and the city of Chorochoad and the city of Demetrias; then Alexandropolis, the metropolis of Arachosia; it is Greek, and by it flows the river Arachotus. As far as this place the land is under the rule of the Parthians."

According to Strabo, Greek advances temporarily went as far as the Shunga capital Pataliputra (today Patna) in eastern India:

"Of the eastern parts of India, then, there have become known to us all those parts which lie this side of the Hypanis, and also any parts beyond the Hypanis of which an account has been added by those who, after Alexander, advanced beyond the Hypanis, to the Ganges and Pataliputra."

— Strabo, 15-1-27

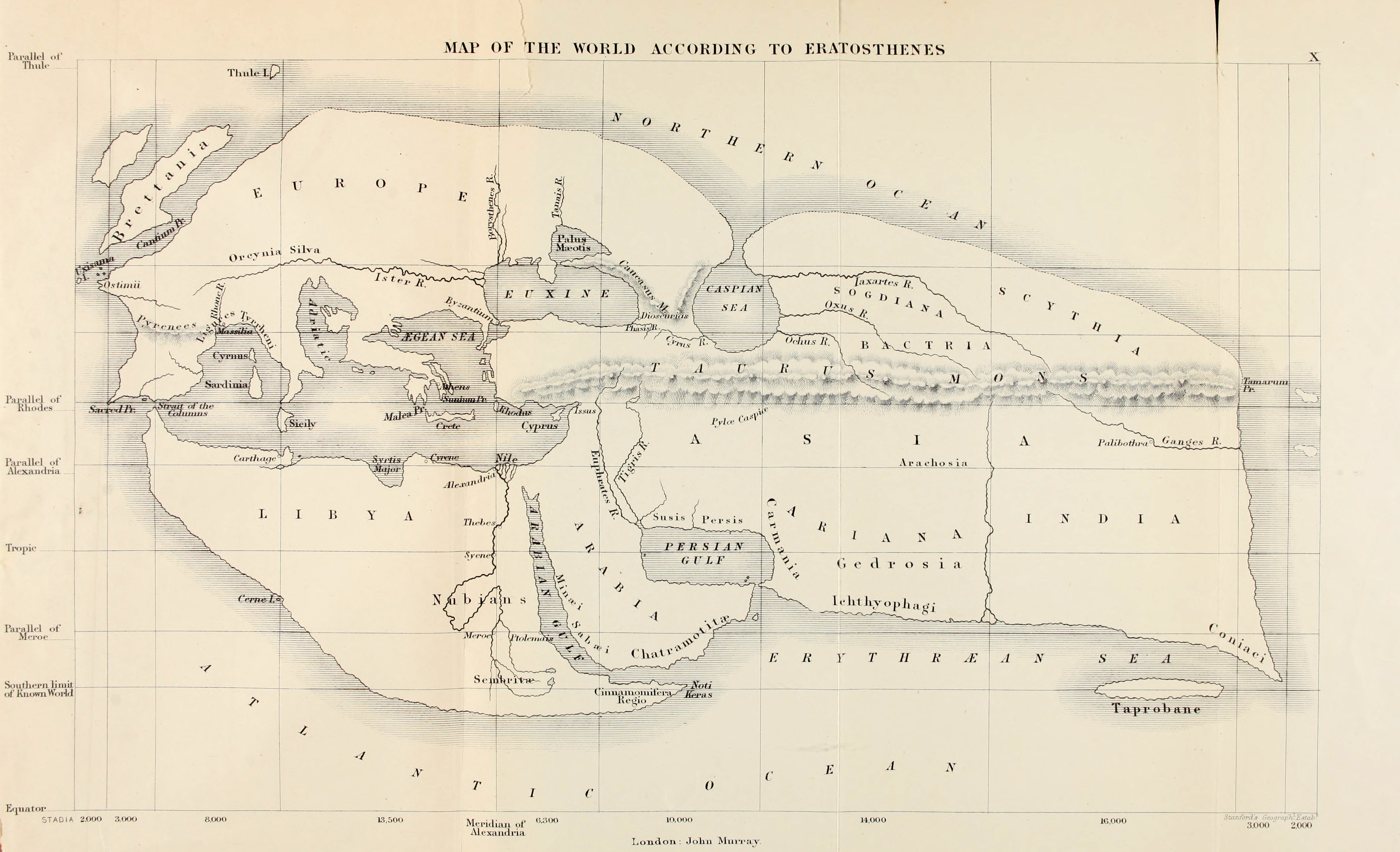
The Hellenistic world view just before the Indo-Greek conquests. India appears fully formed, with the Ganges and Palibothra (Pataliputra) in the east. (19th-century reconstruction of an ancient world map of Eratosthenes (276-194 BCE).)

The 1st century BCE Greek historian Apollodorus, quoted by Strabo, affirms that the Bactrian Greeks, led by Demetrius I and Menander, conquered India and occupied a larger territory than the Macedonian Greeks under Alexander the Great, going beyond the Hypanis towards the Himalayas:

"The Greeks became masters of India and more tribes were subdued by them than by Alexander — by Menander in particular, for some were subdued by him personally and others by Demetrius, the son of Euthydemus the king of the Bactrians."

— Apollodorus, quoted in Strabo 11.11.1

The Roman historian Justin also mentioned the Indo-Greek conquests, describing Demetrius as "King of the Indians" ("Regis Indorum"), and explaining that after vanquishing him Eucratides in turn "put India under his rule" ("Indiam in potestatem redegit") (since the time of the embassies of Megasthenes in the 3rd century BCE "India" was understood as the entire subcontinent, and was cartographed by geographers such as Eratosthenes). Justin also mentions Apollodotus and Menander as kings of the Indians.

Greek and Indian sources tend to indicate that the Greeks campaigned as far as Pataliputra until they were forced to retreat following the coup staged by Eucratides back in Bactria circa 170 BCE, suggesting an occupation period of about eight years. Alternatively, Menander may merely have joined a raid led by Indian Kings down the Ganges (A.K. Narain and Keay 2000), as Indo-Greek territory has only been confirmed from the Kabul Valley to the Punjab.

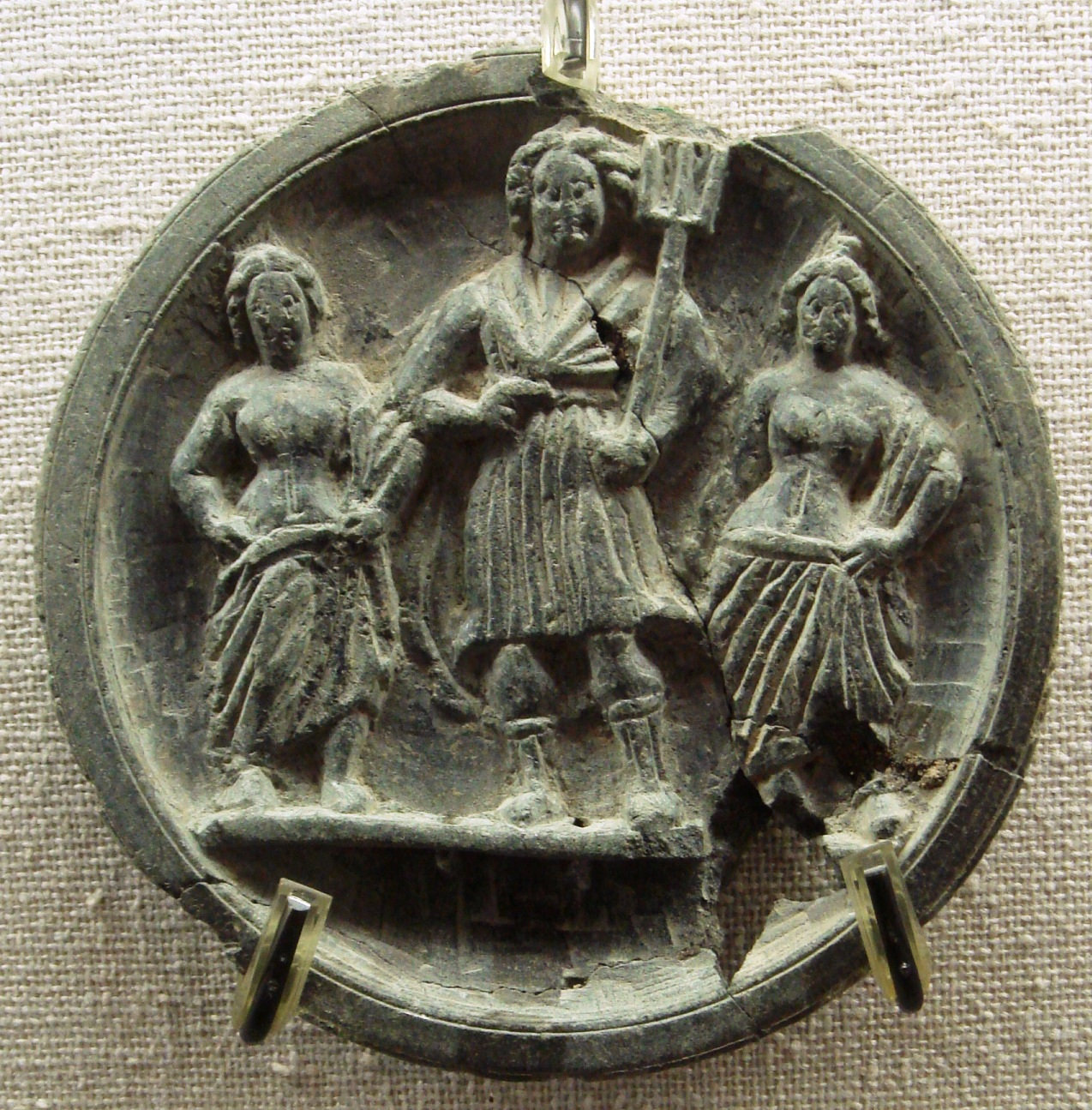
An Indo-Greek stone palette showing Poseidon with attendants. He wears a chiton tunic, a chlamys cape, and boots. 2nd-1st century BCE, Gandhara, Ancient Orient Museum.

To the south, the Greeks occupied the areas of the Sindh and Gujarat down to the region of Surat (Greek: Saraostus) near Mumbai (Bombay), including the strategic harbour of Barygaza (Bharuch), as attested by several writers (Strabo 11; Periplus of the Erythraean Sea, Chap. 41/47) and as evidenced by coins dating from the Indo-Greek ruler Apollodotus I:

"The Greeks... took possession, not only of Patalene, but also, on the rest of the coast, of what is called the kingdom of Saraostus and Sigerdis."

— Strabo 11.11.1

The 1st century CE Periplus of the Erythraean Sea describes numerous Greek buildings and fortifications in Barigaza, although mistakenly attributing them to Alexander, and testifies to the circulation of Indo-Greek coinage in the region:

"The metropolis of this country is Minnagara, from which much cotton cloth is brought down to Barygaza. In these places there remain even to the present time signs of the expedition of Alexander, such as ancient shrines, walls of forts and great wells."

— Periplus, Chap. 41

"To the present day ancient drachmae are current in Barygaza, coming from this country, bearing inscriptions in Greek letters, and the devices of those who reigned after Alexander, Apollodorus (sic) and Menander."

— Periplus Chap. 47

From ancient authors (Pliny, Arrian, Ptolemy and Strabo), a list of provinces, satrapies, or simple regional designations, and Greek cities from within the Indo-Greek Kingdom can be discerned (though others have been lost), ranging from the Indus basin to the upper valley of the Ganges.

=== Indian literary sources ===
There are Indian literary sources, ranging from the Milinda Panha, a dialogue between a Buddhist sage Nagasena and King Menander I, which includes some incidental information on Menander's biography and the geography and institutions of his kingdom, down to a sentence about Menander (presumably the same Menander) and his attack on Pataliputra which happens to have survived as a standard example in grammar texts; none is a narrative history. Names in these sources are consistently Indianized, and there is some dispute whether, for example, Dharmamitra represents "Demetrius" or is an Indian prince with that name. There was also a Chinese expedition to Bactria by Chang-k'ien under the Emperor Wu of Han, recorded in the Records of the Grand Historian and Book of the Former Han, additional evidence is in the Book of the Later Han; the identification of places and peoples behind transcriptions into Chinese is difficult, and several alternate interpretations have been proposed.

Various Indian records describe Yavana attacks on Mathura, Panchala, Saketa, and Pataliputra. The term Yavana is thought to be a transliteration of "Ionians" and is known to have designated Hellenistic Greeks (starting with the Edicts of Ashoka, where Ashoka writes about "the Yavana king Antiochus"), but may have sometimes referred to other foreigners as well, especially in later centuries.

Patanjali, a grammarian and commentator on Pāṇini around 150 BCE, describes in the Mahābhāsya, the invasion in two examples using the imperfect tense of Sanskrit, denoting a recent event:

- "Arunad Yavanah Sāketam" ("The Yavanas (Greeks) were besieging Saketa")
- "Arunad Yavano Madhyamikām" ("The Yavanas were besieging Madhyamika" (the "Middle country")).

The Anushasanaparava of the Mahabharata affirms that the country of Mathura, the heartland of India, was under the joint control of the Yavanas and the Kambojas. The Vayupurana asserts that Mathura was ruled by seven Greek kings over a period of 82 years.

Accounts of battles between the Greeks and the Shunga in Central India are also found in the Mālavikāgnimitram, a play by Kālidāsa which describes an encounter between Greek forces and Vasumitra, the grandson of Pushyamitra, during the latter's reign.

Also the Brahmanical text of the Yuga Purana, which describes Indian historical events in the form of a prophecy, relates the attack of the Indo-Greeks on the capital Pataliputra, a magnificent fortified city with 570 towers and 64 gates according to Megasthenes, and describes the ultimate destruction of the city's walls:

"Then, after having approached Saketa together with the Panchalas and the Mathuras, the Yavanas, valiant in battle, will reach Kusumadhvaja ("The town of the flower-standard", Pataliputra). Then, once Puspapura (another name of Pataliputra) has been reached and its celebrated mud[-walls] cast down, all the realm will be in disorder."

— Yuga Purana, Paragraph 47–48, 2002 edition.

According to the Yuga Purana a situation of complete social disorder follows, in which the Yavanas rule and mingle with the people, and the position of the Brahmins and the Sudras is inverted:

"Sudras will also be utterers of bho (a form of address used towards an equal or inferior), and Brahmins will be utterers of arya (a form of address used towards a superior), and the elders, most fearful of dharma, will fearlessly exploit the people. And in the city the Yavanas, the princes, will make this people acquainted with them: but the Yavanas, infatuated by war, will not remain in Madhyadesa."

— Yuga Purana, Paragraph 55–56, 2002 edition.

== Archaeological sources ==
There is also significant archaeological evidence, including some epigraphic evidence, for the Indo-Greek kings, such as the mention of the "Yavana" embassy of king Antialcidas on the Heliodorus pillar in Vidisha, primarily in Indic languages, which has the same problems with names as the Indic literary evidence.

=== Urban remains ===
The city of Sirkap, today in northwestern Pakistan near Taxila, was built according to the "Hippodamian" grid-plan characteristic of Greek cities, and was a Hellenistic fortress of considerable proportions, with a 6,000 meter wall on the circumference, of a height of about 10 meters. The houses of the Indo-Greek level are "the best planned of all the six strata, and the rubble masonry of which its walls are built is also the most solid and compact". It is thought that the city was built by Demetrius.

=== Artifacts ===
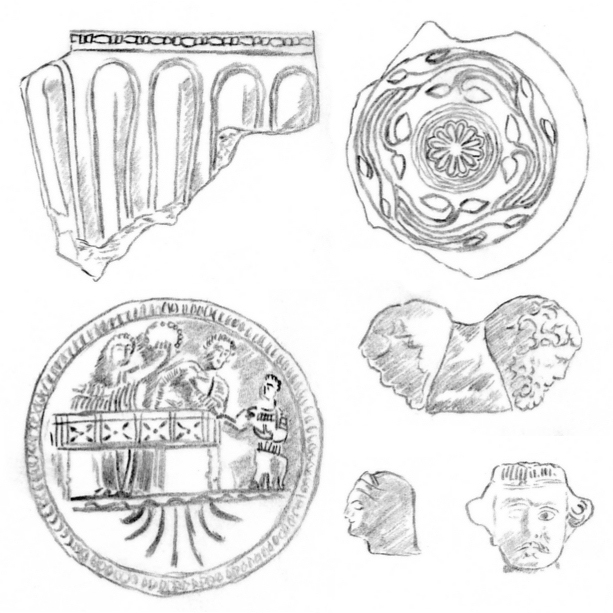
Main archaeological artifacts from the Indo-Greek strata at Taxila. Source: John Marshall "Taxila, Archaeological excavations".

Several Hellenistic artifacts have been found, in particular coins of Indo-Greek kings, stone palettes representing Greek mythological scenes, and small statuettes. Some of them are purely Hellenistic, others indicate an evolution of the Greco-Bactrian styles found at Ai-Khanoum towards more indianized styles. For example, accessories such as Indian ankle bracelets can be found on some representations of Greek mythological figures such as Artemis.

The excavations of the Greek levels at Sirkap were however very limited and made in peripheral areas, out of respect for the more recent archaeological strata (those of the Indo-Scythian and especially Indo-Parthian levels) and the remaining religious buildings, and due to the difficulty of excavating extensively to a depth of about 6 meters. The results, although interesting, are partial and cannot be considered as exhaustive. Beyond this, no extensive archaeological excavation of an Indo-Greek city has ever really been done.

Quantities of Hellenistic artifacts and ceramics can also be found throughout Northern India. Clay seals depicting Greek deities, and the depiction of an Indo-Greek king thought to be Demetrius, were found at Benares.

=== Stupas ===
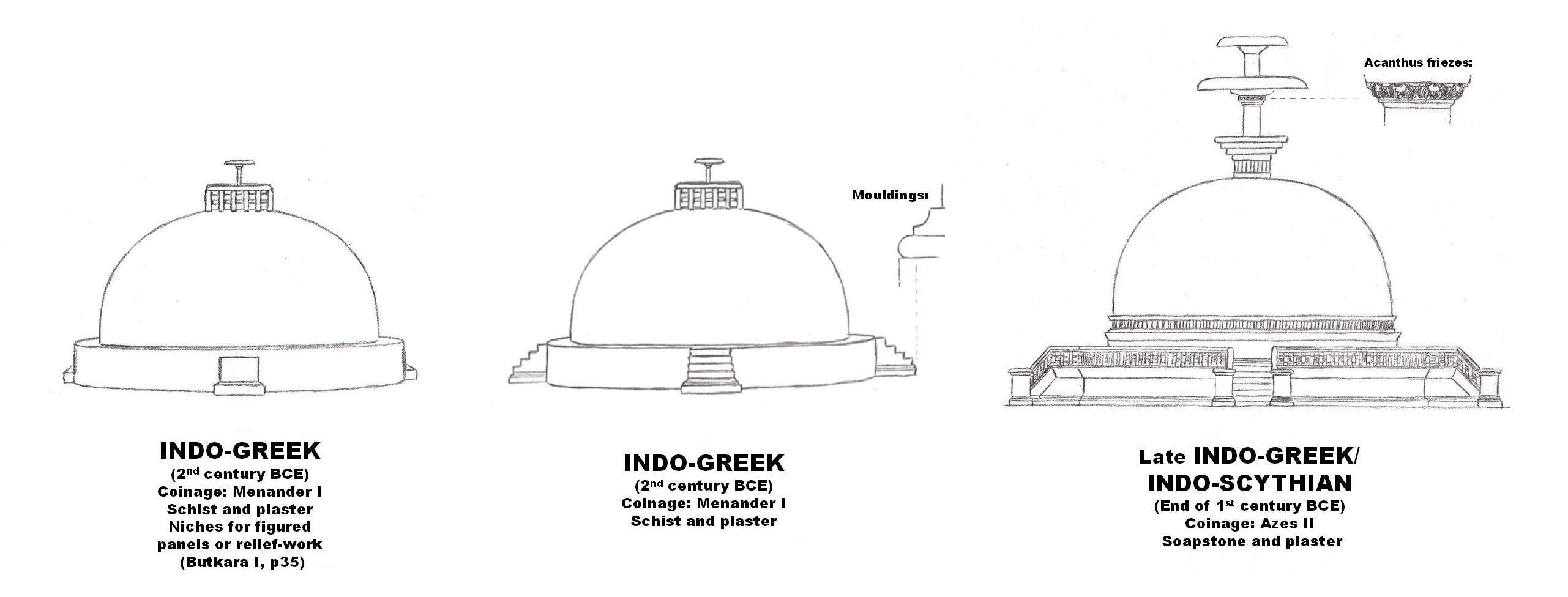
Evolution of the Butkara stupa (Swat) during the Indo-Greek period.

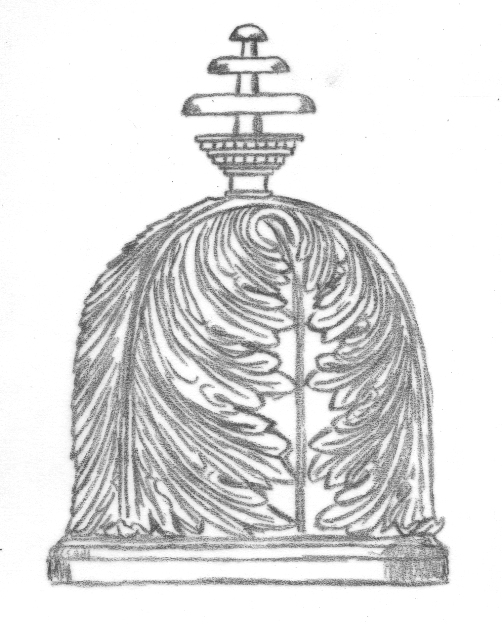
Stupa decorated with acanthus leaves, Level III, Sirkap, 1st century BCE. Diameter: 2.5 meters.

When the Indo-Greeks settled in the area of Taxila, large Buddhist structures were already present, such as the stupa of Dharmarajika built by Ashoka in the 3rd century BCE. These structures were reinforced in the following centuries, by building rings of smaller stupas and constructions around the original ones. Numerous coins of the Indo-Greek king Zoilos II were found under the foundation of a 1st-century BCE rectangular chapel near the Dharmarajika stupa.

Also, various Buddhist structures, such as the Butkara Stupa in the area of Swat were enlarged and decorated with Hellenistic architectural elements in the 2nd century BCE, especially during the rule of Menander. Stupas were just round mounds when the Indo-Greeks settled in India, possibly with some top decorations, but soon they added various structural and decorative elements, such as reinforcement belts, niches, architectural decorations such as plinthes, toruses and cavettos, plaster painted with decorative scrolls. The niches were probably designed to place statues or friezes, an indication of early Buddhist descriptive art during the time of the Indo-Greeks. Coins of Menander were found within these constructions dating them to around 150 BCE. By the end of Indo-Greek rule and during the Indo-Scythian period (1st century BCE), stupas were highly decorated with colonnaded flights of stairs and Hellenistic scrolls of Acanthus leaves.

== Numismatical sources ==
One of the key pieces of archaeological evidence about the Indo-Greeks is the coins. There are coin finds of several dozen Indo-Greek rulers in India; exactly how many is complicated to determine, because the Greeks did not number their kings, and the eastern Greeks did not date their coins. For example, there are a substantial number of coin finds for a King Demetrius, but authors have postulated one, two, or three Demetrii, and the same coins have been identified by different enquirers as describing Demetrius I, Demetrius II, or Demetrius III. The following deductions have been made from coins, in addition to mere existence:

- Kings who left many coins reigned long and prosperously.
- Hoards which contain many coins of the same king come from his realm.
- Kings who use the same iconography are friendly, and may well be from the same family,
- If a king overstrikes another king's coins, this is an important evidence to show that the overstriker reigned after the overstruck. Overstrikes may indicate that the two kings were enemies.
- Indo-Greek coins, like other Hellenistic coins, have monograms in addition to their inscriptions. These are generally held to indicate a mint official; therefore, if two kings issue coins with the same monogram, they reigned in the same area, and if not immediately following one another, have no long interval between them.

All of these arguments are arguments of probability, and have exceptions; one of Menander's coins was found in Wales.

	Greco-Bactrian kings		Indo-Greek kings					
Territories/ dates	West Bactria	East Bactria	Paropamisade	Arachosia	Gandhara	Western Punjab	Eastern Punjab	Mathura
326-325 BCE	Campaigns of Alexander the Great in India						Nanda Empire	
312 BCE	Creation of the Seleucid Empire						Creation of the Maurya Empire	
305 BCE	Seleucid Empire after Mauryan war		Maurya Empire					
280 BCE	Foundation of Ai-Khanoum							
255–239 BCE	Independence of the Greco-Bactrian kingdom Diodotus I		Emperor Ashoka (268-232 BCE)					
239–223 BCE	Diodotus II							
230–200 BCE	Euthydemus I							
200–190 BCE	Demetrius I				Sunga Empire			
190-185 BCE	Euthydemus II							
190–180 BCE	Agathocles			Pantaleon				
185–170 BCE	Antimachus I							
180–160 BCE			Apollodotus I					
175–170 BCE	Demetrius II							
160–155 BCE			Antimachus II					
170–145 BCE	Eucratides I							
155–130 BCE	Yuezhi occupation, loss of Ai-Khanoum	Eucratides II; Plato; Heliocles I	Menander I					
130–120 BCE	Yuezhi occupation		Zoilus I		Agathoclea			Yavanarajya inscription
120–110 BCE			Lysias		Strato I			Yavanarajya inscription
110–100 BCE			Antialcidas		Heliocles II			Yavanarajya inscription
100 BCE			Polyxenus		Demetrius III			Yavanarajya inscription
100–95 BCE			Philoxenus					Yavanarajya inscription
95–90 BCE			Diomedes	Amyntas		Epander		Yavanarajya inscription
90 BCE			Theophilus	Peucolaus		Thraso		Yavanarajya inscription
90–85 BCE			Nicias	Menander II		Artemidorus		Yavanarajya inscription
90–70 BCE			Hermaeus	Archebius				Yavanarajya inscription
			Yuezhi occupation		Maues (Indo-Scythian)			
75–70 BCE				Vonones	Telephus	Apollodotus II		
65–55 BCE				Spalirises		Hippostratus	Dionysius	
55–35 BCE					Azes I (Indo-Scythians)		Zoilus II	
55–35 BCE					Vijayamitra/ Azilises		Apollophanes	
25 BCE – 10 CE				Gondophares	Zeionises	Kharahostes	Strato II; Strato III	
				Gondophares (Indo-Parthian)			Rajuvula (Indo-Scythian)	
			Kujula Kadphises (Kushan Empire)				Bhadayasa (Indo-Scythian)	Sodasa (Indo-Scythian)

== See also ==
- Greco-Bactrian Kingdom
- Seleucid Empire
- Greco-Buddhism
- Indo-Scythians
- Indo-Parthian kingdom
- Kushan Empire
- Timeline of Indo-Greek kingdoms

== Footnotes ==
Timeline and cultural period	Indus plain (Punjab-Sapta Sindhu-Gujarat)	Gangetic Plain			Central India	Southern India
Timeline and cultural period	Indus plain (Punjab-Sapta Sindhu-Gujarat)	Upper Gangetic Plain (Ganga-Yamuna doab)	Middle Gangetic Plain	Lower Gangetic Plain	Central India	Southern India
IRON AGE
Culture	Late Vedic Period	Late Vedic Period; Painted Grey Ware culture	Late Vedic Period; Northern Black Polished Ware		Pre-history	
6th century BCE	Gandhara	Kuru-Panchala	Magadha		Adivasi (tribes)	Assaka
Culture	Persian-Greek influences	"Second Urbanisation"; Rise of Shramana movements Jainism - Buddhism - Ājīvika - Yoga			Pre-history	
5th century BCE	(Persian conquests)		Shaishunaga dynasty		Adivasi (tribes)	Assaka
4th century BCE	(Greek conquests)	Nanda empire				
HISTORICAL AGE
Culture	Spread of Buddhism				Pre-history	
3rd century BCE	Maurya Empire					Satavahana dynasty Sangam period (300 BCE – 200 CE); Early Cholas; Early Pandyan kingdom Cheras
Culture	Preclassical Hinduism (Note: Michaels (2004) p.39) - "Hindu Synthesis" (Note: Hiltebeitel (2002)) (ca. 200 BCE - 300 CE) (Note: Michaels (2004) p.39) (Note: Hiltebeitel (2002)); Epics - Puranas - Ramayana - Mahabharata - Bhagavad Gita - Brahma Sutras - Smarta Tradition; Mahayana Buddhism					
2nd century BCE	Indo-Greek Kingdom		Shunga Empire; Maha-Meghavahana Dynasty			Satavahana dynasty Sangam period (300 BCE – 200 CE); Early Cholas; Early Pandyan kingdom Cheras
1st century BCE	Indo-Greek Kingdom		Shunga Empire; Maha-Meghavahana Dynasty			Satavahana dynasty Sangam period (300 BCE – 200 CE); Early Cholas; Early Pandyan kingdom Cheras
1st century CE	Indo-Scythians; Indo-Parthians		Kuninda Kingdom			Satavahana dynasty Sangam period (300 BCE – 200 CE); Early Cholas; Early Pandyan kingdom Cheras
2nd century	Kushan Empire					Satavahana dynasty Sangam period (300 BCE – 200 CE); Early Cholas; Early Pandyan kingdom Cheras
3rd century	Kushano-Sasanian Kingdom; Western Satraps	Kushan Empire		Kamarupa kingdom	Adivasi (tribes)	Satavahana dynasty Sangam period (300 BCE – 200 CE); Early Cholas; Early Pandyan kingdom Cheras
Culture	"Golden Age of Hinduism"(ca. CE 320-650) (Note: Michaels (2004) p.40); Puranas - Kural; Co-existence of Hinduism and Buddhism					
4th century	Kidarites	Gupta Empire; Varman dynasty				Andhra Ikshvakus; Kalabhra dynasty Kadamba Dynasty; Western Ganga Dynasty
5th century	Hephthalite Empire	Alchon Huns				Vishnukundina; Kalabhra dynasty
6th century	Nezak Huns; Kabul Shahi; Maitraka				Adivasi (tribes)	Vishnukundina; Badami Chalukyas; Kalabhra dynasty
Culture	Late-Classical Hinduism (ca. CE 650-1100) (Note: Michaels (2004) p.41); Advaita Vedanta - Tantra; Decline of Buddhism in India					
7th century	Indo-Sassanids		Vakataka dynasty Empire of Harsha	Mlechchha dynasty	Adivasi (tribes)	Badami Chalukyas; Eastern Chalukyas; Pandyan kingdom (revival); Pallava
7th century	Karkota dynasty				Adivasi (tribes)	
8th century	Kabul Shahi	Pala Empire			Adivasi (tribes)	Eastern Chalukyas; Pandyan kingdom Kalachuri
9th century	Gurjara-Pratihara				Adivasi (tribes)	Rashtrakuta Empire; Eastern Chalukyas; Pandyan kingdom Medieval Cholas; Chera Perumals of Makkotai
10th century	Ghaznavids			Pala dynasty Kamboja-Pala dynasty	Adivasi (tribes)	Kalyani Chalukyas; Eastern Chalukyas; Medieval Cholas; Chera Perumals of Makkotai; Rashtrakuta
References and sources for table References Sources: Flood, Gavin D. (1996), An Introduction to Hinduism, Cambridge University Press; Hiltebeitel, Alf (2002), Hinduism. In: Joseph Kitagawa, "The Religious Traditions of Asia: Religion, History, and Culture", Routledge; Michaels, Axel (2004), Hinduism. Past and present, Princeton, New Jersey: Princeton University Press
