= Aristophyli =

Ancient tribe in Bactria

The Aristophyli were a tribe of the district of Paropamisus, in Bactria. near the Karakorum Ranges during the Classical era.

== History ==
During the Hellenistic and Persian Empires the Arstophyli lived in the satrapy of the Paropanisadai.

They are mentioned in Claudius Ptolemaeus and appear on a map of that work, in the area north west of modern Kabul.

They came under the rule of Demetrius I of Bactria, who was ruling Greek Bactria from Kupisa. until Eucratides I of the Indo-Greek Kingdom conquered the area.
