= Ambantae =

Extinct ancient tribe

The Ambantae were a tribe, in the district of Paropamisis in Bactria near the Hindu Kush ranges in northern Afghanistan during antiquity, and who were mentioned by Ptolemy, Curtius and Strabo. Strabo records that their lands, though very cold in winter, were fertile.

== History ==
During the Hellenistic and Persian Empires the Ambantae lived in the satrapy of the Paropanisadai.

They are mentioned in Claudius Ptolemaeus and appear on map XI of that work, in the area north west of modern Kabul.

They came under the rule of Demetrius I of Bactria, who was ruling Greek Bactria from Kupisa until Eucratides I of the Indo-Greek Kingdom conquered the area.
