= Polyxenus Epiphanes Soter =

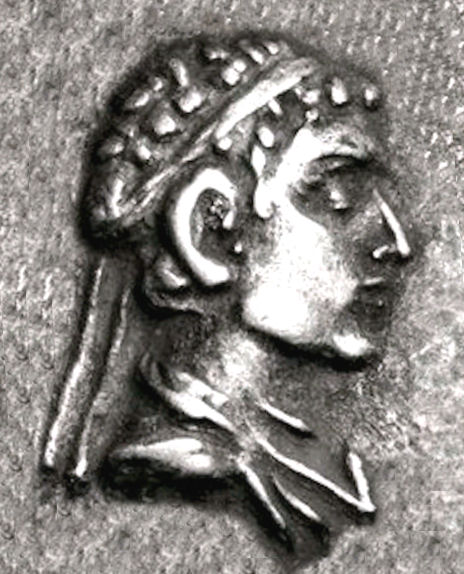
- Portrait Polyxenus

Indo-Greek king
- Reign: c. 100 BC
- Burial: Swat Valley

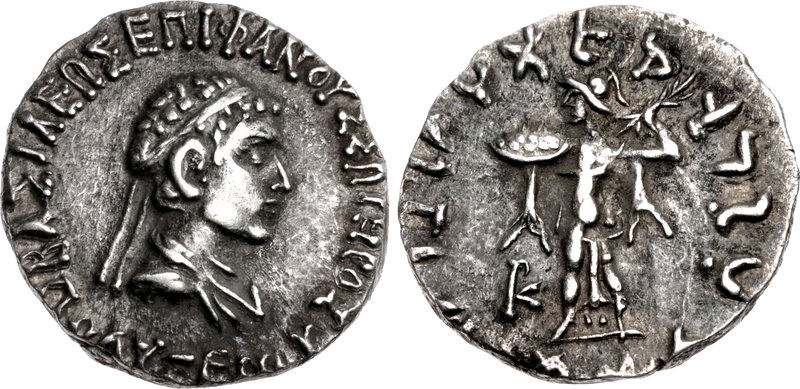
Coin of Polyxenus. Greek legend: ΒΑΣΙΛΕΩΣ ΕΠΙΦΑΝΟΥ ΣΩΤΗΡΟΣ ΠΟΛΥΞΕΝΟΥ "Of Illustrious and Saviour King Polyxenos".

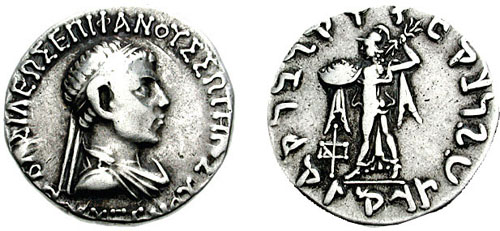
Coin of Polyxenos. Greek legend: ΒΑΣΙΛΕΩΣ ΕΠΙΦΑΝΟΥ ΣΩΤΗΡΟΣ ΠΟΛΥΞΕΝΟΥ "Of Illustrious and Saviour King Polyxenos".

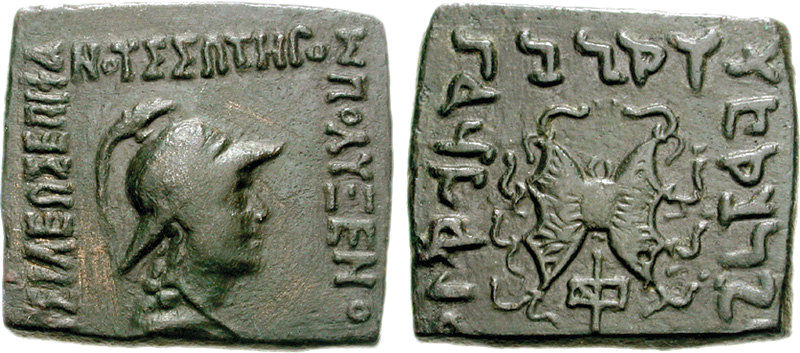
Indian-standard coin of Polyxenos. Greek legend: ΒΑΣΙΛΕΩΣ ΕΠΙΦΑΝΟΥ ΣΩΤΗΡΟΣ ΠΟΛΥΞΕΝΟΥ "Of Illustrious and Saviour King Polyxenos".

Polyxenus Epiphanes Soter (Ancient Greek: Πολύξενος Ἐπιφανῆς Σωτήρ, romanized: Polyxenos Epiphanēs Sōtēr, "Polyxenus the Illustrious Saviour") was an Indo-Greek king who ruled briefly in western Punjab or Gandhara.

== Date ==
Osmund Bopearachchi places Polyxenus c. 100 BC and R. C. Senior c. 85–80 BC.

== Coinage ==
Polyxenus, whose portraits depict a diademed young man, struck silver coins which closely resemble those of Strato I. Both kings used the epithets Soter Epiphanes and the reverse of Athena Alcidemus (fighting Pallas Athene), the emblem of the dynasty of Menander I. Polyxenus also struck bronzes with Athena on the obverse and her aegis on the reverse. He issued no Attic silver.

His bronzes depict the head of Athena with a reverse of her aegis.

Polyxenus' coins are few and feature only three monograms: these he shares with Strato I as well as Heliocles II and Archebius, according to Bopearachchi and RC Senior.

He was therefore likely to have been a brief contestant for power in the central Indo-Greek kingdom after the presumably violent death of Straton I, who was possibly his father.

== Notes ==
Preceded by Heliocles II (?)	Indo-Greek ruler in Paropamisade, Arachosia c. 100 BC	Succeeded by Philoxenus

	Greco-Bactrian kings		Indo-Greek kings					
Territories/ dates	West Bactria	East Bactria	Paropamisade	Arachosia	Gandhara	Western Punjab	Eastern Punjab	Mathura
326-325 BCE	Campaigns of Alexander the Great in India						Nanda Empire	
312 BCE	Creation of the Seleucid Empire						Creation of the Maurya Empire	
305 BCE	Seleucid Empire after Mauryan war		Maurya Empire					
280 BCE	Foundation of Ai-Khanoum							
255–239 BCE	Independence of the Greco-Bactrian kingdom Diodotus I		Emperor Ashoka (268-232 BCE)					
239–223 BCE	Diodotus II							
230–200 BCE	Euthydemus I							
200–190 BCE	Demetrius I				Sunga Empire			
190-185 BCE	Euthydemus II							
190–180 BCE	Agathocles			Pantaleon				
185–170 BCE	Antimachus I							
180–160 BCE			Apollodotus I					
175–170 BCE	Demetrius II							
160–155 BCE			Antimachus II					
170–145 BCE	Eucratides I							
155–130 BCE	Yuezhi occupation, loss of Ai-Khanoum	Eucratides II; Plato; Heliocles I	Menander I					
130–120 BCE	Yuezhi occupation		Zoilus I		Agathoclea			Yavanarajya inscription
120–110 BCE			Lysias		Strato I			Yavanarajya inscription
110–100 BCE			Antialcidas		Heliocles II			Yavanarajya inscription
100 BCE			Polyxenus		Demetrius III			Yavanarajya inscription
100–95 BCE			Philoxenus					Yavanarajya inscription
95–90 BCE			Diomedes	Amyntas		Epander		Yavanarajya inscription
90 BCE			Theophilus	Peucolaus		Thraso		Yavanarajya inscription
90–85 BCE			Nicias	Menander II		Artemidorus		Yavanarajya inscription
90–70 BCE			Hermaeus	Archebius				Yavanarajya inscription
			Yuezhi occupation		Maues (Indo-Scythian)			
75–70 BCE				Vonones	Telephus	Apollodotus II		
65–55 BCE				Spalirises		Hippostratus	Dionysius	
55–35 BCE					Azes I (Indo-Scythians)		Zoilus II	
55–35 BCE					Vijayamitra/ Azilises		Apollophanes	
25 BCE – 10 CE				Gondophares	Zeionises	Kharahostes	Strato II; Strato III	
				Gondophares (Indo-Parthian)			Rajuvula (Indo-Scythian)	
			Kujula Kadphises (Kushan Empire)				Bhadayasa (Indo-Scythian)	Sodasa (Indo-Scythian)
