= Demetrius III Aniketos =

Demetrios III Aniketos ("The Invincible")
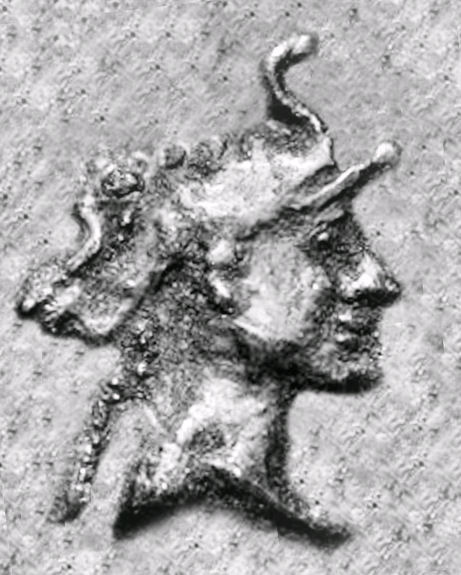
- Portrait of Demetrius III.

Indo-Greek king
- Reign: c. 100 BCE

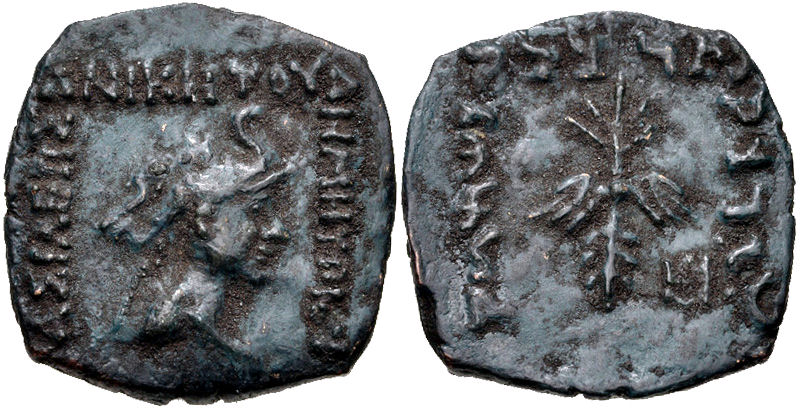
Copper coins of Demetrius Aniketos. Obv: Bust of king, wearing an elephant's scalp, with Greek legend: BASILEOS ANIKETOU DEMETRIOU "Of Invincible King Demetrius". Rev: Winged thunderbolt. Kharoshthi legend: MAHARAJASA APARAJITASA DIMETRIA (Invincible king Demetrius).

Copper coins of Demetrius Aniketos. Obv: Bust of king, wearing an elephant's scalp, with Greek legend: BASILEOS ANIKETOU DEMETRIOU "Of Invincible King Demetrius". Rev: Winged thunderbolt. Kharoshthi legend: MAHARAJASA APARAJITASA DIMETRIA (Invincible king Demetrius).

Demetrius III Aniketos (Greek: Δημήτριος Γ΄ ὁ Ἀνίκητος; epithet means "the Invincible") was an Indo-Greek king who reigned in the area of Gandhara and Punjab.

== Controversy about time of reign ==
The coins of Demetrius III are few and rather crude. He copies some of his imagery from the renowned Bactrian king Demetrius I (c. 200–180 BCE). The two namesakes share the war-like epithet "The Invincible" and wear elephant-crowns, the symbol that Alexander the Great used to celebrate his conquest of the Indus Valley.

The historical sources of the Indo-Greek kingdom are very few, and the separation of kings with the same name is not an easy process. Numismatician Osmund Bopearachchi identifies three kings named Demetrius, placing the third around 100 BCE due to mintmarks and style of the coins (see discussion under Demetrius II). R C Senior agrees with this reconstruction, even though their dates are somewhat different: according to Bopearachchi he ruled around 100 BCE, whereas R. C. Senior places him circa 70 BCE, in both cases as successor of Heliokles II.

However, Demetrius III is the only Demetrius to strike bilingual Greek/Indian (Kharoshti) coins, and is therefore a likely candidate to be identified with the "Demetrius, king of the Indians" mentioned by Roman historian Justin. This Demetrius is said to have fought with the Bactrian king Eucratides (c. 170–145 BCE) during the latter part of Eucratides' rule. Bopearachchi nevertheless identifies Justin's Demetrius with the king Demetrius II even though he only struck Greek coins and reigned c. 175–170 BCE, even before Eucratides. In addition, Bopearachchi's early dating of Demetrius II has been challenged (see discussion under Demetrius II).

Yet other authors have identified Justin's Demetrius with Demetrius I of Bactria, ignoring both Bopearachchi's chronology as well as modifying Justin's text.

Earlier authors such as Tarn and Narain thought that the Demetrius who struck the coins now identified with Demetrius III was the king who fought Eucratides, and saw him as a son of Demetrius I.

The absence of absolute proofs of dating Demetrius III (such as counter-marked coins), and the remaining problems of all current reconstructions, means the problem is not definitely solved, and the alternative chronology would be to place Demetrius III around 150 BCE in compliance with Tarn's and Narain's ideas about his identity as a Euthydemid prince who fought against Eucratides.

== Possible dynastic context ==
If he ruled around 150 BCE, he was very likely a surviving Euthydemid prince like Tarn and Narain assumed, and due to his name this would make sense. The symbols of his coin connect him with several Euthydemid kings: the kausia hat on one of his portrait with Antimachus I, the elephant-crown and the title Aniketos as mentioned with Demetrius I, and the standing Zeus on his silver reverses with Agathocles.

== Coins of Demetrius III ==
The actual coins of Demetrius III are very few and struck with a single, unique monogram. This suggests a short and insignificant reign. On his silver, Demetrius III appears in the kausia hat (on the unique known tetradrachm) or diademed, with a reverse of Zeus holding thunderbolt. His bronzes feature a king in elephant's crown, either Demetrius III or Demetrius I, with thunderbolt on the reverse.

== See also ==
- Indo-Greek Kingdom
- Greco-Buddhism
- Indo-Scythians

== Notes ==
Preceded by Heliokles II	Indo-Greek Ruler (in Gandhara, Punjab) c. 100 BC	Succeeded by Philoxenus

	Greco-Bactrian kings		Indo-Greek kings					
Territories/ dates	West Bactria	East Bactria	Paropamisade	Arachosia	Gandhara	Western Punjab	Eastern Punjab	Mathura
326-325 BCE	Campaigns of Alexander the Great in India						Nanda Empire	
312 BCE	Creation of the Seleucid Empire						Creation of the Maurya Empire	
305 BCE	Seleucid Empire after Mauryan war		Maurya Empire					
280 BCE	Foundation of Ai-Khanoum							
255–239 BCE	Independence of the Greco-Bactrian kingdom Diodotus I		Emperor Ashoka (268-232 BCE)					
239–223 BCE	Diodotus II							
230–200 BCE	Euthydemus I							
200–190 BCE	Demetrius I				Sunga Empire			
190-185 BCE	Euthydemus II							
190–180 BCE	Agathocles			Pantaleon				
185–170 BCE	Antimachus I							
180–160 BCE			Apollodotus I					
175–170 BCE	Demetrius II							
160–155 BCE			Antimachus II					
170–145 BCE	Eucratides I							
155–130 BCE	Yuezhi occupation, loss of Ai-Khanoum	Eucratides II; Plato; Heliocles I	Menander I					
130–120 BCE	Yuezhi occupation		Zoilus I		Agathoclea			Yavanarajya inscription
120–110 BCE			Lysias		Strato I			Yavanarajya inscription
110–100 BCE			Antialcidas		Heliocles II			Yavanarajya inscription
100 BCE			Polyxenus		Demetrius III			Yavanarajya inscription
100–95 BCE			Philoxenus					Yavanarajya inscription
95–90 BCE			Diomedes	Amyntas		Epander		Yavanarajya inscription
90 BCE			Theophilus	Peucolaus		Thraso		Yavanarajya inscription
90–85 BCE			Nicias	Menander II		Artemidorus		Yavanarajya inscription
90–70 BCE			Hermaeus	Archebius				Yavanarajya inscription
			Yuezhi occupation		Maues (Indo-Scythian)			
75–70 BCE				Vonones	Telephus	Apollodotus II		
65–55 BCE				Spalirises		Hippostratus	Dionysius	
55–35 BCE					Azes I (Indo-Scythians)		Zoilus II	
55–35 BCE					Vijayamitra/ Azilises		Apollophanes	
25 BCE – 10 CE				Gondophares	Zeionises	Kharahostes	Strato II; Strato III	
				Gondophares (Indo-Parthian)			Rajuvula (Indo-Scythian)	
			Kujula Kadphises (Kushan Empire)				Bhadayasa (Indo-Scythian)	Sodasa (Indo-Scythian)
