= Demetrius II of India =

Demetrius II
- King of Kings
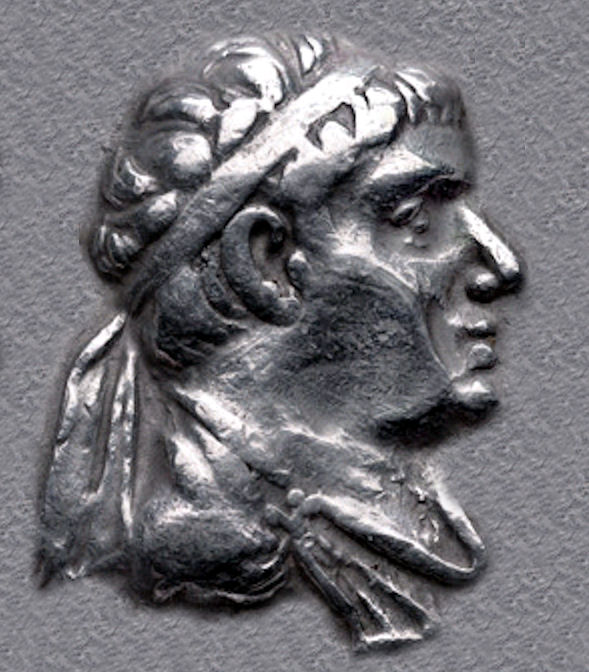
- Portrait of Demetrius II

Indo-Greek King
- Reign: 175–170 BC or 140 BC
- Predecessor: Apollodotus I
- Successor: Antimachus II
- Issue: Menander I Strato I
- Dynasty: Euthydemid
- Father: Demetrius I
- Mother: Daughter of Antiochus III and Laodice III

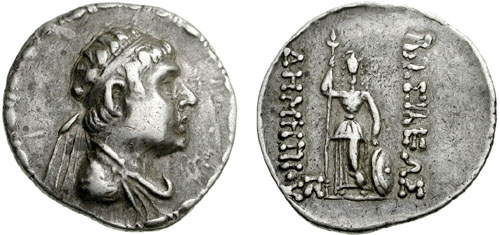
Coin of Demetrius II. Obv: Profile of Demetrius II. Rev: Standing Athena with legend "(of) King Demetrius".

Demetrius II (Greek: Δημήτριος) was an Indo-Greek king who ruled briefly during the 2nd century BC. Little is known about him and there are different views about how to date him. Earlier authors such as Tarn and Narain saw him as a son and sub-king of Demetrius I, but this view has now been abandoned.

Osmund Bopearachchi has suggested that he ruled in Bactria and Arachosia c. 175–170 BC, but this has been challenged by later authors. R. C. Senior instead prefers c. 175–140 BC, and this is supported by L M Wilson who also assumes from numismatical clues and portrait likeness that Demetrius II was a relative of Eucratides the Great. The later dating is supported by the circumstance that no coins of Demetrius II have been found in the ruins of Ai Khanoum, which was presumably destroyed during the reign of Eucratides I.

== Coinage ==
Demetrius II issued only silver and mostly tetradrachms, another trait which he has in common with the last Bactrian kings. The obverse shows a diademed portrait, with a standing Pallas Athene holding a spear on the reverse. Unlike most of his contemporaries, he has no epithet. Demetrius II is depicted as a young man, though his features differ considerably among the different issues. Several coins are struck off-center and crudely; this suggests that Demetrius II used a number of temporary mints.

== Identification ==
Roman historian Justin names a "Demetrius, king of the Indians," who was an enemy of Eucratides the Great (reigned 172/171–145 BC). Justin's Demetrius beleaguered the warlike Eucratides with an army of 60,000 men against the latter's garrison of 300, but still — according to the probably exaggerated account — eventually was defeated. This episode is referred to as occurring at the end of the reign of Eucratides, hence dating the death of Justin's Demetrius around 150 BC.

However, the king mentioned by Justin is not easily reconciled with the numismatic evidence, and views are divided as for how to interpret the various coinage series bearing the name Demetrius. Bopearachchi has identified three kings named Demetrius. Demetrius I reigned in Bactria and India c. 200-185 BC, well before the rise of Eucratides, and Demetrius III was an Indian king who is thought to have ruled much later, around 100 BC. There remains Demetrius II, who Bopearachchi suggested reigned around 170 BC.

Bopearachchi identified Demetrius II with Justin’s Demetrius of India, notwithstanding the fact that Justin's quote suggests a later reign. Furthermore, Bopearachchi’s Demetrius II reigned in Bactria and not in India, as he struck no coins with Indian legends. Therefore, the identity of Justin's Demetrius, king of the Indians, remains uncertain. The following hypotheses may be considered:

- The account of Justin, who is a second-hand source, is confused. Either Demetrius II was not king of India but Bactria, or the account of the war is mixed up, or the king's name is wrong, Justin having confused the name of another Indo-Greek king with that of Demetrius I.
- Bopearachchi's Demetrius III could be placed earlier - this king's coins are few and rather peculiar - and Demetrius III was in fact Justin's Demetrius who ruled half a century earlier.

Even if Justin's Demetrius, king of the Indians existed, this does not foreclose the possibility that Eucratides also had a son named Demetrius, which was a common dynastic name at the time. The prince may have been named after the Seleucid Demetrius I Soter.

== See also ==
- Indo-Greek Kingdom
- Seleucid Empire
- Greco-Buddhism
- Indo-Scythians
- Indo-Parthian Kingdom
- Kushan Empire

== Notes ==
	Greco-Bactrian kings		Indo-Greek kings					
Territories/ dates	West Bactria	East Bactria	Paropamisade	Arachosia	Gandhara	Western Punjab	Eastern Punjab	Mathura
326-325 BCE	Campaigns of Alexander the Great in India						Nanda Empire	
312 BCE	Creation of the Seleucid Empire						Creation of the Maurya Empire	
305 BCE	Seleucid Empire after Mauryan war		Maurya Empire					
280 BCE	Foundation of Ai-Khanoum							
255–239 BCE	Independence of the Greco-Bactrian kingdom Diodotus I		Emperor Ashoka (268-232 BCE)					
239–223 BCE	Diodotus II							
230–200 BCE	Euthydemus I							
200–190 BCE	Demetrius I				Sunga Empire			
190-185 BCE	Euthydemus II							
190–180 BCE	Agathocles			Pantaleon				
185–170 BCE	Antimachus I							
180–160 BCE			Apollodotus I					
175–170 BCE	Demetrius II							
160–155 BCE			Antimachus II					
170–145 BCE	Eucratides I							
155–130 BCE	Yuezhi occupation, loss of Ai-Khanoum	Eucratides II; Plato; Heliocles I	Menander I					
130–120 BCE	Yuezhi occupation		Zoilus I		Agathoclea			Yavanarajya inscription
120–110 BCE			Lysias		Strato I			Yavanarajya inscription
110–100 BCE			Antialcidas		Heliocles II			Yavanarajya inscription
100 BCE			Polyxenus		Demetrius III			Yavanarajya inscription
100–95 BCE			Philoxenus					Yavanarajya inscription
95–90 BCE			Diomedes	Amyntas		Epander		Yavanarajya inscription
90 BCE			Theophilus	Peucolaus		Thraso		Yavanarajya inscription
90–85 BCE			Nicias	Menander II		Artemidorus		Yavanarajya inscription
90–70 BCE			Hermaeus	Archebius				Yavanarajya inscription
			Yuezhi occupation		Maues (Indo-Scythian)			
75–70 BCE				Vonones	Telephus	Apollodotus II		
65–55 BCE				Spalirises		Hippostratus	Dionysius	
55–35 BCE					Azes I (Indo-Scythians)		Zoilus II	
55–35 BCE					Vijayamitra/ Azilises		Apollophanes	
25 BCE – 10 CE				Gondophares	Zeionises	Kharahostes	Strato II; Strato III	
				Gondophares (Indo-Parthian)			Rajuvula (Indo-Scythian)	
			Kujula Kadphises (Kushan Empire)				Bhadayasa (Indo-Scythian)	Sodasa (Indo-Scythian)
