= Agathoclea =

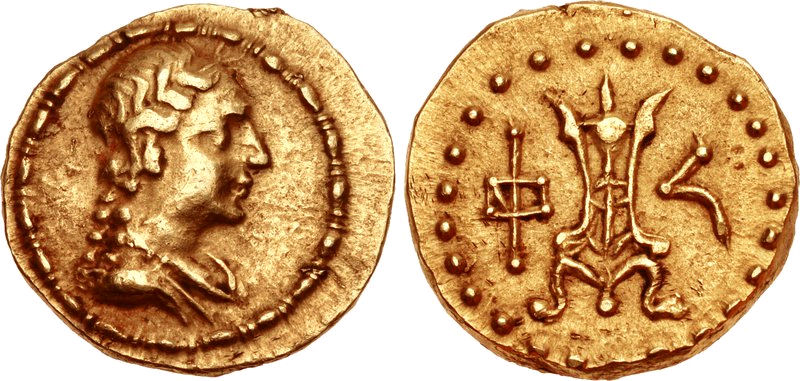
- Coin of Agathokleia

Indo-Greek Queen regent
- Reign: 130-120 BC
- Successor: Strato I
- Born: c. 155 BC; Bactria
- Died: c.100 BC; Sagala
- Burial: Stupas in Gandhara
- Spouse: Menander I
- Issue: Strato I
- Dynasty: Indo-Greek Kingdom
- Father: Agathocles ? or Eucratides I ?

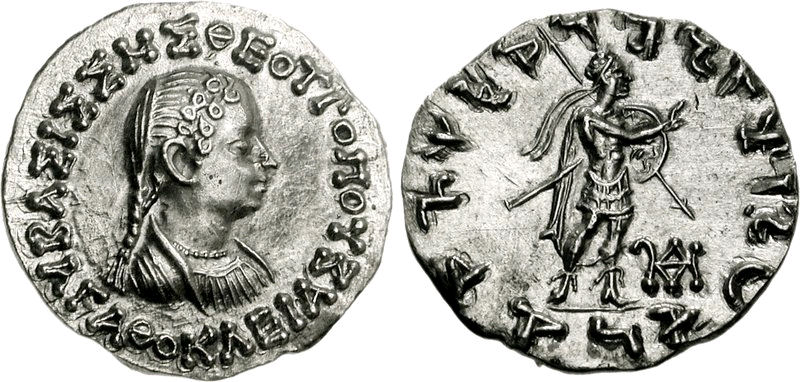
Drachm of Agathoclea. The obverse with the queen's portrait and Greek inscription: BAΣIΛIΣΣHΣ ΘEOTPOΠOY AΓAΘOKΛEIAΣ, Basilissēs Theotropou Agathokleias, "Of the Goddess-like queen Agathoclea". Reverse with Strato I standing in armour, and Kharosthi legend: Maharajasa Tratarasa Stratasa Agathukreya, "Of Saviour King Strato and Agathoclea."

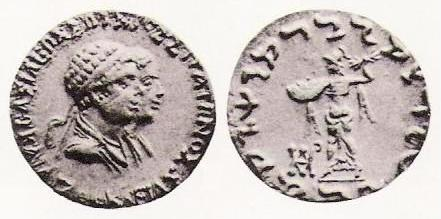
Coin of Strato I and Agathoclea. Obverse with the conjugate busts of Strato and Agathoclea, and Greek legend: ΒΑΣΙΛΕΩΣ ΣΩΤΗΡΟΣ ΣΤΡΑΤΩΝΟΣ ΚΑΙ ΑΓΑΘΟΚΛΕΙΑΣ, Basileōs Sōtēros Stratōnos Kai Agathokleias, "Of Saviour King Strato, and Agathoclea". Reverse with Athena Alkidemos throwing thunderbolt, and Kharosthi legend: Maharajasa Tratasara Dharmikasa Stratasa, "Of King Strato, the Saviour and Just (i.e. "of the Dharma")".

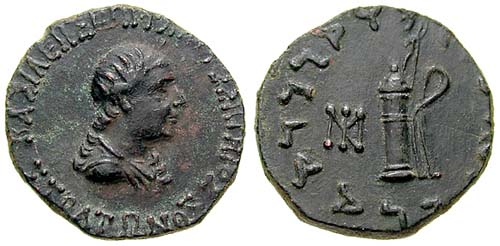
Coin of Agathoclea. Obverse with Agathoclea in profile. Reverse with the Greek straight bow and arrow container.

Agathoclea Theotropus (Ancient Greek: Ἀγαθόκλεια Θεότροπος, romanized: Agathokleia Theotropos; the epithet possibly means the Goddess-like) was an Indo-Greek queen married to Menander I, who ruled in parts of northern India in the 2nd-century BC as regent for her son Strato I. Born in Bactria, likely to a noble family (probably royal) with some authors such as Tarn alleging she was a daughter of Eucratides, however this is uncertain and Tarn is often criticised by modern authors for casually creating dynastic relationships. Nonetheless, Agathoclea would become one of the first female rulers in the Hellenistic world, and she seems to have been relatively significant due to her large presence on the coins of her son.

== Date and genealogy ==
The traditional view, introduced by Tarn and defended as late as 1998 by Bopearachchi, is that Agathokleia was the widow of Menander I and possibly daughter of Agathocles. She may also have been the daughter of Eucratides. In the civil wars after Menander's death, the Indo-Greek empire was divided, with Agathokleia and her young son Strato maintaining themselves in the eastern territories of Gandhara and Punjab.

The modern view, embraced by R. C. Senior and probably more solid since it is founded on numismatic analysis, suggests that Agathokleia was a later queen, perhaps ruling from 110 BC–100 BC or slightly later. In this case, Agathoclea was likely the widow of another king, possibly Nicias or Theophilus. In either case, Agathokleia was among the first women to rule a Hellenistic Kingdom.

Some of her subjects may have been reluctant to accept an infant king with a queen regent: unlike the Seleucid and Ptolemaic Kingdoms, almost all Indo-Greek rulers were depicted as grown men. This was probably because the kings were required to command armies, as can be seen on their coins where they are often depicted with helmets and spears. Agathokleia seems to have associated herself with Athena, the goddess of war. Athena was also the dynastic deity of the family of Menander, and Agathokleia's prominent position suggests that she was herself the daughter of a king, though she was probably too late to have been a daughter of the Bactrian king Agathocles.

== Coinage ==
The coins of Agathokleia and Strato were all bilingual, and Agathoclea's name appears more often in the Greek legend than in the Indian.

(See Strato I for details of legends.)

Most of Agathoclea's coins were struck jointly with her son Strato, though on their first issues, he is not featured on the portrait.

Silver: Bust of Agathoclea/walking king

Bust of Strato and Agathoclea conjoined/Athena Alcidemus

Bronzes: Bust of either helmeted Athena or Agathoclea as a personification of this goddess/sitting Heracles

The later king Heliocles II overstruck some of Agathoclea's coins.

== See also ==
- Greco-Buddhism
- Indo-Scythians

== Sources ==
- W. W. Tarn. The Greeks in Bactria and India. Third Edition. Cambridge: University Press, 1966.

Preceded by Menander I	Indo-Greek ruler in Gandhara and Punjab	Succeeded by Strato I

	Greco-Bactrian kings		Indo-Greek kings					
Territories/ dates	West Bactria	East Bactria	Paropamisade	Arachosia	Gandhara	Western Punjab	Eastern Punjab	Mathura
326-325 BCE	Campaigns of Alexander the Great in India						Nanda Empire	
312 BCE	Creation of the Seleucid Empire						Creation of the Maurya Empire	
305 BCE	Seleucid Empire after Mauryan war		Maurya Empire					
280 BCE	Foundation of Ai-Khanoum							
255–239 BCE	Independence of the Greco-Bactrian kingdom Diodotus I		Emperor Ashoka (268-232 BCE)					
239–223 BCE	Diodotus II							
230–200 BCE	Euthydemus I							
200–190 BCE	Demetrius I				Sunga Empire			
190-185 BCE	Euthydemus II							
190–180 BCE	Agathocles			Pantaleon				
185–170 BCE	Antimachus I							
180–160 BCE			Apollodotus I					
175–170 BCE	Demetrius II							
160–155 BCE			Antimachus II					
170–145 BCE	Eucratides I							
155–130 BCE	Yuezhi occupation, loss of Ai-Khanoum	Eucratides II; Plato; Heliocles I	Menander I					
130–120 BCE	Yuezhi occupation		Zoilus I		Agathoclea			Yavanarajya inscription
120–110 BCE			Lysias		Strato I			Yavanarajya inscription
110–100 BCE			Antialcidas		Heliocles II			Yavanarajya inscription
100 BCE			Polyxenus		Demetrius III			Yavanarajya inscription
100–95 BCE			Philoxenus					Yavanarajya inscription
95–90 BCE			Diomedes	Amyntas		Epander		Yavanarajya inscription
90 BCE			Theophilus	Peucolaus		Thraso		Yavanarajya inscription
90–85 BCE			Nicias	Menander II		Artemidorus		Yavanarajya inscription
90–70 BCE			Hermaeus	Archebius				Yavanarajya inscription
			Yuezhi occupation		Maues (Indo-Scythian)			
75–70 BCE				Vonones	Telephus	Apollodotus II		
65–55 BCE				Spalirises		Hippostratus	Dionysius	
55–35 BCE					Azes I (Indo-Scythians)		Zoilus II	
55–35 BCE					Vijayamitra/ Azilises		Apollophanes	
25 BCE – 10 CE				Gondophares	Zeionises	Kharahostes	Strato II; Strato III	
				Gondophares (Indo-Parthian)			Rajuvula (Indo-Scythian)	
			Kujula Kadphises (Kushan Empire)				Bhadayasa (Indo-Scythian)	Sodasa (Indo-Scythian)
