= William Woodthorpe Tarn =

British classical scholar and historian (1869–1957)

Sir William Woodthorpe Tarn FBA
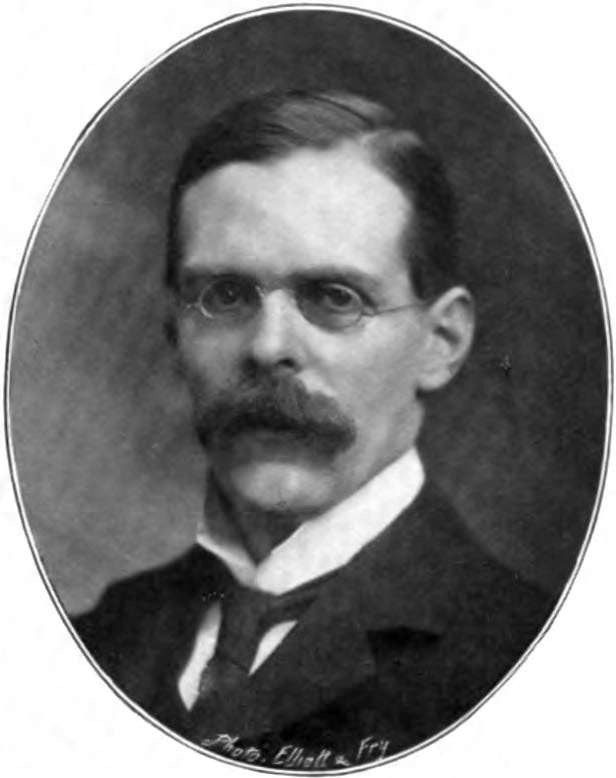
- Portrait by Elliott & Fry, c. 1905
- Born: 26 February 1869; London, England
- Died: 7 November 1957 (aged 88); Inverness, Highland, Scotland
- Occupations: Barrister; Classical scholar
- Spouse: Flora Macdonald (m. 1896; died 1937)
- Children: 1

Academic background
- Education: Eton College; Trinity College, Cambridge
- Academic advisor: Henry Jackson

Academic work
- Discipline: Hellenistic history
- Notable works: Antigonos Gonatas (1913); The Greeks in Bactria & India (1938); Alexander the Great (1948)

Sir William Woodthorpe Tarn FBA (26 February 1869 – 7 November 1957) was a British classical scholar and writer. He wrote extensively on the Hellenistic world, particularly on Alexander the Great's empire and its successor states.

== Life ==
William Woodthorpe Tarn was born in London on 26 February 1869, eldest of two sons and one daughter of William Tarn (b. 1841), a silk merchant, and Frances Arthy (b. 1843/4). He was educated at Eton College, where he was school captain and a king's scholar, graduating in 1888. He studied at Trinity College, Cambridge, with Henry Jackson, sparking a lifelong interest in Greek philosophy. He then studied law at the Inner Temple, becoming a chancery barrister in 1894. In 1896 he married Flora Macdonald (d. 1937). He had one daughter, Otta, for whom he wrote a fairy story, The Treasure of the Isle of Mist (1919).

Following the long illness of Flora, Tarn had a breakdown and retired from law. He left London for Scotland, where he made his home initially at Mountgerald, near Dingwall, and later at Muirtown House, near Inverness. His interest in Greek philosophy reappeared in his first book, Antigonos Gonatas (1913), he sought to bring his subject, whom he admired, to life. Despite technical advances and numerous revisionist challenges, Tarn's books continue to influence the subject at the end of the twentieth century.

During the Great War, Tarn worked as an intelligence officer, having been refused enlistment in the army due to poor sight.

Tarn published in learned journals, especially on ancient Hellenistic, geographical, military, and naval history. He was known as "a forceful if courteous controversialist", according to Adcock. He rejected J. S. Morrison's early argument about the construction of triremes. His Lees Knowles lectures at Trinity College, published as Hellenistic Military and Naval Developments in 1930, have remained in print ever since. He then spent several years working on the pioneering The Greeks in Bactria and India, which became a classic in the field. Tarn was elected FBA in 1928 and took a Cambridge LittD in 1931. He was a member of several learned societies and academies in Britain and abroad, and was made an honorary LLD by Edinburgh University in 1933. In 1939 he was made an honorary fellow of Trinity College, Cambridge. He was elected to the American Philosophical Society in 1947. In 1952 he was knighted for his services to history.

Tarn lived out his retirement as a country gentleman. He died at his home near Inverness on 7 November 1957.

== Works ==
Tarn's prolific scholarship, publishing some 153 works, was seminal to the development of Hellenistic studies in the Twentieth Century. His study of Greeks in Hellenistic Asia used new and diverse sources, using Greek, Babylonian, Indian and Tibetan sources to complement Greek sources.

According to some, Tarn offered a somewhat idealistic interpretation of Alexander's conquests as culturally inclusive and essentially driven by his vision of the "unity of mankind" in the Opis Decree. Such a reading, which echoes Hellenistic philosophical ecumenicalism has been challenged by recent revisionists. Jeanne Reames remarked that "Tarn's portrait of Alexander turned the Greek conqueror into a proper Scottish gentleman". Likewise, Ernst Badian criticised Tarn for his prejudice against opponents to Alexander. When discussing the revolt of the Spartan king Agis III in 331 BC, Badian added that Tarn "distort[ed] the actual facts in an all but irresponsible fashion" in his work.

Reames also saw Tarn's strong influence in Mary Renault's trilogy of historical novels about Alexander - though Renault's acknowledged Alexander's homo-erotic tendencies, while Tarn had regarded references to them in ancient sources as "defamations" which the Macedonian king had to be defended against.

Tarn's ground-breaking work on Graeco-Bactrian history considered the interaction between Greek and non-Greek subject peoples in Hellenistic territories and how these developed over time. He characterised the cosmopolitan Bactrian Euthydemid dynasty as "a courageous experiment that failed". His works are considered very influential, if often challenged by more recent scholarship, on the subject of the Greco-Bactrian and Indo-Greek history.

His only non-academic writing is The Treasure of the Isle of Mist (1919), a fairytale dedicated to his daughter Otta.

== Publications ==
- Antigonos Gonatas. Oxford: Clarendon Press, 1913. (Later editions: Oxford University Press, 1969 (hardcover, ISBN 0-19-814275-7); Chicago: Argonaut, 1969 (hardcover, ISBN 0-8244-0142-5)). (See Antigonos Gonatas.)
- The Treasure of the Isle of Mist. London: Philip Allan & Co, 1919. – fantasy adventure for children
- The Hellenistic Age: Aspects of Hellenistic Civilisation, by J.B. Bury, E.A. Barber, Edwyn Bevan, and Tarn. Cambridge: Cambridge University Press, 1923.
- Hellenistic Civilisation. London: Edward Arnold & Co., 1927. (2nd, rev. ed., 1930. 3rd ed., with G.T. Griffith, 1952.)
- Seleucid-Parthian Studies (Proceedings of the British Academy; XVI). London: Humphrey Milford, 1930.
- Hellenistic Military and Naval Developments. Cambridge U. Press, 1930. (Latest ed., New York: Biblo and Tannen, 1998 (paperback, ISBN 0-8196-0169-1)).
- Alexander the Great and the Unity of Mankind. Humphrey Milford, 1933.
- The Greeks in Bactria & India. Cambridge: Cambridge University Press, 1938. (3rd, revised ed. Chicago Ridge, IL: Ares Publishers, 1997 (hardcover, ISBN 0-89005-524-6)). Online at Archive.Org
- Alexander the Great. Vol. I, Narrative; Vol. II, Sources and Studies. Cambridge U. Press, 1948. (New ed., 2002 (paperback, ISBN 0-521-53137-3)).
- Tarn, W. W. "Alexander and the Ganges," Journal of Hellenic Studies, 43 (1923), 93–101
- Tarn, W. W. "Heracles Son of Barsine." JHS 41.1 (1921): 18–28.

== See also ==
- Will Cuppy

== Bibliography ==
- Adcock, F.E. Sir William Woodthorpe Tarn, 1869–1957. London, 1959.
- Ernst Badian, "Agis III", Hermes, Vol. 95 (1967), pp. 170–192.
- Opis Decree in Arrian's Anabasis Arrian on the mutiny at Opis – Livius
