= Heliocles II =

Heliocles II Dicaeus
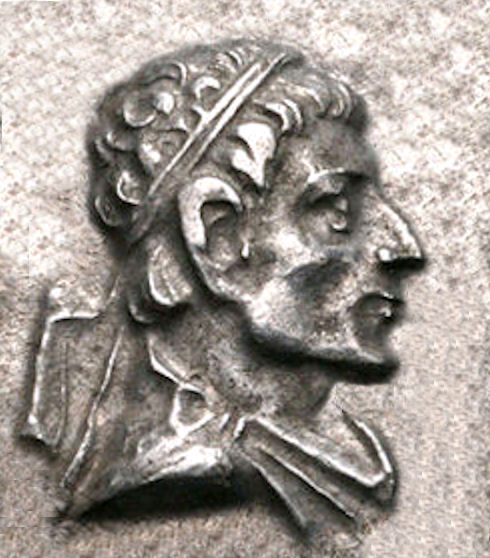
- Portrait of Heliocles II

Indo-Greek king
- Reign: 95–80 BC

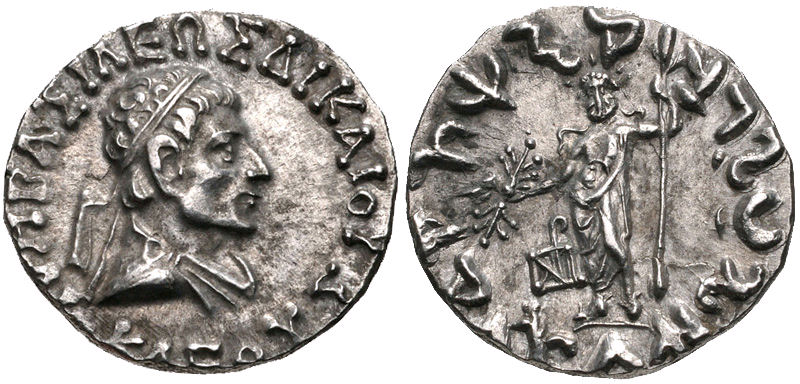
Coin of Heliocles II. Greek legend: ΒΑΣΙΛΕΩΣ ΔΙΚΑΙΟΥ ΗΛΙΟΚΛΕΟΥΣ "Of King Heliocles the Just"

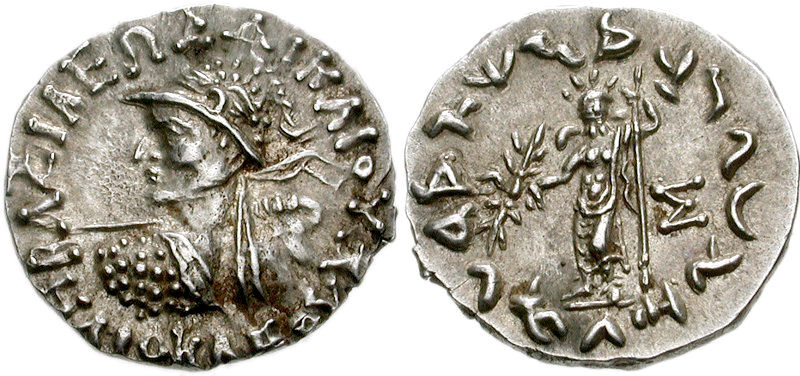
Heliocles II with spear. Greek legend: ΒΑΣΙΛΕΩΣ ΔΙΚΑΙΟΥ ΗΛΙΟΚΛΕΟΥΣ "Of King Heliocles the Just"

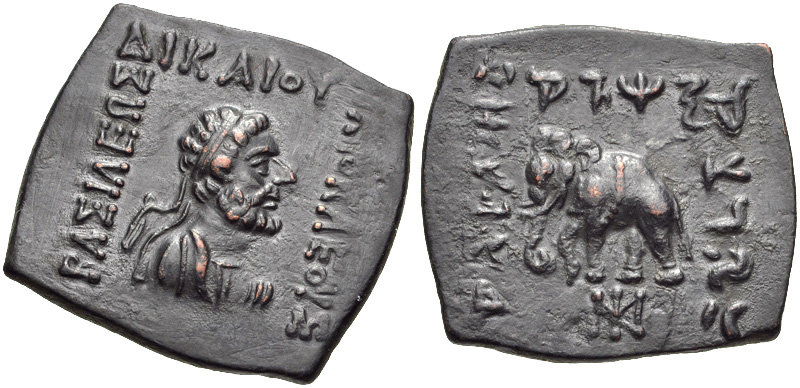
Bronze coin of Heliocles II Obv: Bust of diademed king. Greek legend: ΒΑΣΙΛΕΩΣ ΔΙΚΑΙΟΥ ΗΛΙΟΚΛΕΟΥΣ "Of King Heliocles the Just" Rev: Kharoshti (Indian) translation, elephant.

Heliocles II Dicaeus (Ancient Greek: Ἡλιοκλῆς Δίκαιος, romanized: Hēlioklēs Dikaios; epithet means "the just") is thought to have been one of the later Indo-Greek kings and a relative of the Bactrian king Heliocles I. Current scholarly consensus is that he ruled ca 95–80 BC.

Heliocles II seems to have been engaged in a series of wars with Strato I in Gandhara and Punjab; the two share several mintmarks and Heliocles II overstruck many of his coins. During this period, a number of kings fought for hegemony in the Indo-Greek territories. Some of them were likely supported by nomad Saka rulers such as Maues.

== Genealogy ==
Heliocles II used a reverse of standing Zeus, who was a common deity among the later Indo-Greek kings. J. Jakobsson sees Heliocles as the son of the important king Antialcidas Nikephoros (whose type was sitting Zeus) and perhaps the grandson of Heliocles I.

He goes on to suggest that Heliocles was the older brother of the king Archebius Nikephoros Dikaios, who seems to have succeeded Heliocles II in Gandhara (perhaps after his death from disease; Heliocles I looks emaciated on his later portraits). Archebius uses a very similar reverse and combines the epithets of Heliocles II and Antialcidas; in addition, their coin portraits are similar, with hooked noses and fierce expressions.

R.C. Senior has instead suggested a connection with Demetrius III, who used a similar reverse of standing Zeus.

== Coins of Heliocles II ==
Heliocles II issued Indian silver with portrait (diademed, helmeted or spear-throwing) / standing Zeus and bronzes with bearded diademed portrait (Heliocles or Zeus) / elephant.

It is uncertain whether he struck Attic coins. A number of posthumous coins for Heliocles I have been found in Bactria; possibly some of these may have been struck by Heliocles II, though there are no similar monograms.

== Overstrikes ==
The existence of numerous overstrikes helps locate the reign of Heliocles II in relation to other Indo-Greek kings. Heliocles overstruck coins of Agathokleia, Strato I, and Hermaeus. Conversely, Amyntas overstruck coins of Heliocles II. These overstrikes suggest that Heliocles II reigned around 95–85 BC and was a contemporary of Amyntas and Hermaeus

== See also ==
- Greco-Bactrian Kingdom
- Seleucid Empire
- Greco-Buddhism
- Indo-Scythians
- Indo-Parthian Kingdom
- Kushan Empire

== Notes ==
Preceded by Strato I	Indo-Greek ruler in Gandhara and Punjab; 110–100 BCE	Succeeded by Demetrius III

	Greco-Bactrian kings		Indo-Greek kings					
Territories/ dates	West Bactria	East Bactria	Paropamisade	Arachosia	Gandhara	Western Punjab	Eastern Punjab	Mathura
326-325 BCE	Campaigns of Alexander the Great in India						Nanda Empire	
312 BCE	Creation of the Seleucid Empire						Creation of the Maurya Empire	
305 BCE	Seleucid Empire after Mauryan war		Maurya Empire					
280 BCE	Foundation of Ai-Khanoum							
255–239 BCE	Independence of the Greco-Bactrian kingdom Diodotus I		Emperor Ashoka (268-232 BCE)					
239–223 BCE	Diodotus II							
230–200 BCE	Euthydemus I							
200–190 BCE	Demetrius I				Sunga Empire			
190-185 BCE	Euthydemus II							
190–180 BCE	Agathocles			Pantaleon				
185–170 BCE	Antimachus I							
180–160 BCE			Apollodotus I					
175–170 BCE	Demetrius II							
160–155 BCE			Antimachus II					
170–145 BCE	Eucratides I							
155–130 BCE	Yuezhi occupation, loss of Ai-Khanoum	Eucratides II; Plato; Heliocles I	Menander I					
130–120 BCE	Yuezhi occupation		Zoilus I		Agathoclea			Yavanarajya inscription
120–110 BCE			Lysias		Strato I			Yavanarajya inscription
110–100 BCE			Antialcidas		Heliocles II			Yavanarajya inscription
100 BCE			Polyxenus		Demetrius III			Yavanarajya inscription
100–95 BCE			Philoxenus					Yavanarajya inscription
95–90 BCE			Diomedes	Amyntas		Epander		Yavanarajya inscription
90 BCE			Theophilus	Peucolaus		Thraso		Yavanarajya inscription
90–85 BCE			Nicias	Menander II		Artemidorus		Yavanarajya inscription
90–70 BCE			Hermaeus	Archebius				Yavanarajya inscription
			Yuezhi occupation		Maues (Indo-Scythian)			
75–70 BCE				Vonones	Telephus	Apollodotus II		
65–55 BCE				Spalirises		Hippostratus	Dionysius	
55–35 BCE					Azes I (Indo-Scythians)		Zoilus II	
55–35 BCE					Vijayamitra/ Azilises		Apollophanes	
25 BCE – 10 CE				Gondophares	Zeionises	Kharahostes	Strato II; Strato III	
				Gondophares (Indo-Parthian)			Rajuvula (Indo-Scythian)	
			Kujula Kadphises (Kushan Empire)				Bhadayasa (Indo-Scythian)	Sodasa (Indo-Scythian)
