= Strato I =

Indo-Greek king from 125/120 to 110 BC

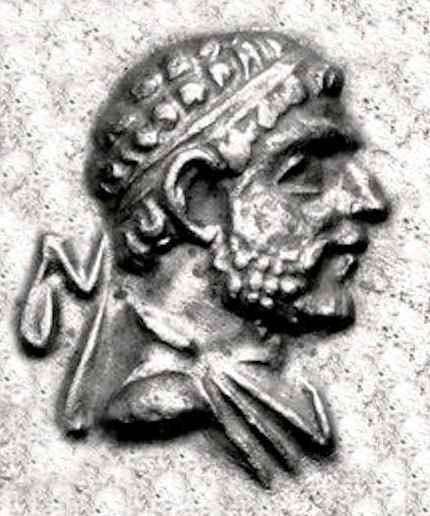
- Portrait of Strato I

Indo-Greek king
- Reign: 125–110 BC
- Predecessor: Agathokleia
- Successor: Menander II
- Born: 138 BC; Sagala
- Died: c. 100 BC
- Issue: Menander II ?
- Dynasty: Yavana
- Father: Menander I
- Mother: Agathokleia
- Religion: Greco-Buddhism

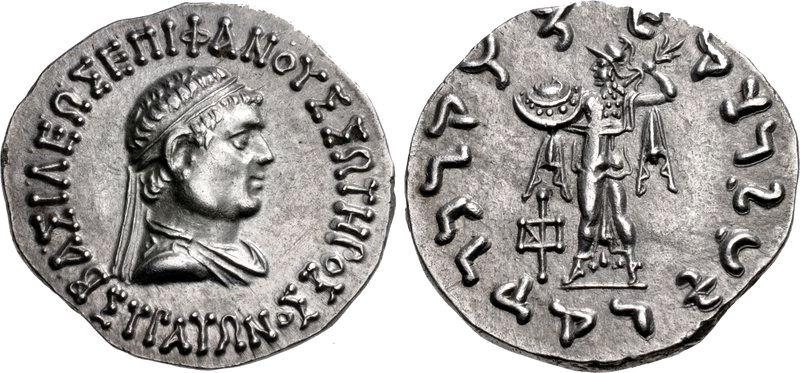
Coin of Strato I. Obv. Greek: ΒΑΣΙΛΕΩΣ ΕΠΙΦΑΝΟΥΣ ΣΩΤΗΡΟΣ ΣΤΡΑΤΩΝΟΣ "of king the illustrious and saviour Strato". Rev. Pali: Maharajasa tratarasa Dhramikasa Stratasa "Great saviour king Strato, follower of the Dharma"

Strato I Dikaios (Greek: Στράτων Δίκαιος Strátōn Díkaios, “Strato the Just”) also known as Stratha in Sanskrit, was a Yavana King (reigned 125/120-110 BC), the son and successor of Menander, Strato’s mother, Agathoclea ruled as Queen Mother and regnant for Strato until 120 BC, when he was of age to succeed his father. He was dynastically succeeded by his son, Menander II.

== Date and genealogy ==
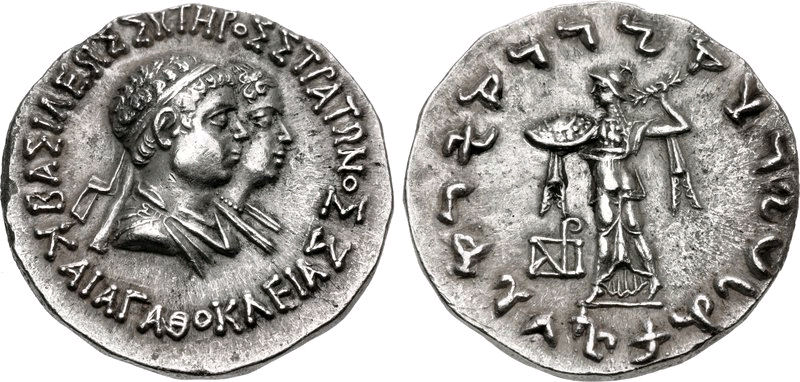
Coin of young Strato I and his mother Agathokleia. Obv: Conjugate busts of Strato and Agathokleia. Greek legend: ΒΑΣΙΛΕΩΣ ΣΩΤΗΡΟΣ ΣΤΡΑΤΩΝΟΣ ΚΑΙ ΑΓΑΘΟΚΛΕΙΑΣ "Of Saviour King Strato, and Agathokleia". Rev: Athena throwing thunderbolt. Kharoshthi legend: MAHARAJASA TRATASARA DHARMIKASA STRATASA "King Strato, Saviour and Just (="of the Dharma")".

Until recently, consensus was that he ruled between c. 130–110 BC in Northern India and that his father was the great king Menander I. Menander ruled the entire Indo-Greek empire, but in this scenario, the western parts including Paropamisade and Arachosia gained independence after the death of Menander I, pushing Strato and Agathokleia eastwards to Gandhara and Punjab. This view was introduced by Tarn and defended as recently as 1998 by Bopearachchi.

The modern view, embraced by R. C. Senior and probably more solid since it is founded on numismatical analyses, suggests that Strato I was a later king, perhaps ruling from 110–85 BC, though perhaps still a descendant of Agathokleia. In this case, Agathokleia was the widow of another king, possibly Nicias or Theophilus.

A third hypothesis was presented in 2007 by J. Jakobsson: according to this, the coins of Strato in fact belong to two kings who both may have ruled around 105–80 BC, though in different territories:

- Strato Soter and Dikaios (Greek: ΣΤΡΑΤΩΝ Ο ΣΩΤΗΡ ΚΑΙ ΔΙΚΑΙΟΣ "Strato the saviour and just/righteous"), was Agathokleia's son.
- Strato Epiphanes Soter (Greek: ΣΤΡΑΤΩΝ Ο ΕΠΙΦΑΝΗΣ ΣΩΤΗΡ "Strato the illustrious, saviour"), was a middle-aged king who may have been Agathokleia's brother and ruled in western Punjab.

This theory was based on difference in titles, in monograms and coin types between the two.

== Events during his reign ==
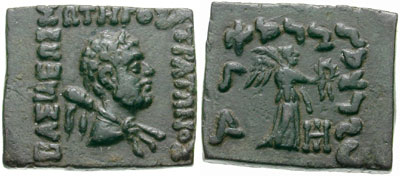
Coin of Strato I in the Indian square standard, ΒΑΣΙΛΕΩΣ ΣΩΤΗΡΟΣ ΣΤΡΑΤΩΝΟΣ ("King Strato the Saviour").

Agathocleia's importance was gradually downplayed on the coins, so presumably her guardianship ended when Strato came of age. Strato I was also the only Indo-Greek king to appear bearded, probably to indicate that he was no longer an infant. Strato I, or the two Stratos, fought for hegemony in Punjab with the king Heliokles II, who overstruck several of their coins. There were very likely wars with other kings as well. The middle-aged Strato, according to the third theory, was succeeded by his son Polyxenios, who ruled only for a short time.

A hoard of Strato's coins was found in Mathura outside New Delhi, which may have been the easternmost outpost of the Indo-Greek territory.

== Coins ==
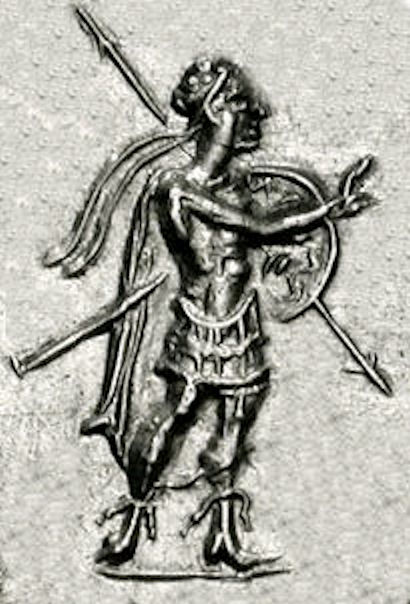
Strato in combat gear, on a coin of Agathokleia, making a blessing gesture, circa 100 BC.

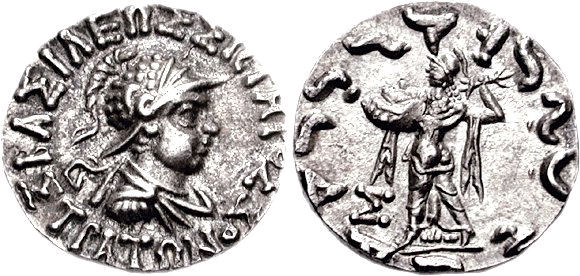
Gold coin of young Strato I with helmet. Greek legend ΒΑΣΙΛΕΩΣ ΣΩΤΗΡΟΣ ΣΤΡΑΤΩΝΟΣ "King saviour Strato".

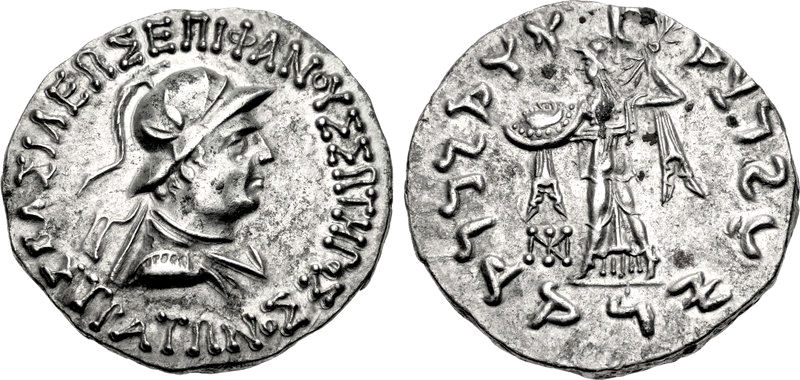
Coin of middle-aged Strato I. Obv. Greek: ΒΑΣΙΛΕΩΣ ΕΠΙΦΑΝΟΥΣ ΣΩΤΗΡΟΣ ΣΤΡΑΤΩΝΟΣ "of king the illustrious and saviour Strato". Rev. Pali: Maharajasa tratarasa Dhramikasa Stratasa "Great saviour king Strato, follower of the Dharma".

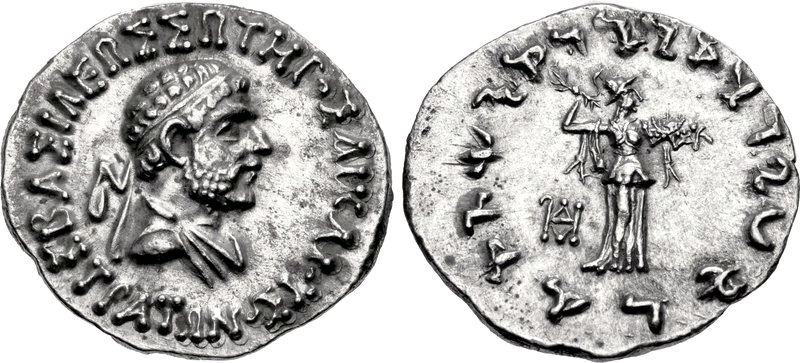
Strato I old and bearded. Greek legend ΒΑΣΙΛΕΩΣ ΣΩΤΗΡΟΣ ΔΙΚΑΙΟΥ ΣΤΡΑΤΩΝΟΣ "of king saviour and just/righteous Strato".

The coins of Strato show portraits aging from a youth to middle-aged. They have been divided into the following periods, where period 8 may belong to the second king.

- Period 1 (Only Agathokleia):

Bronzes: Athena / seated Heracles.
Obverse - Greek: ΒΑΣΙΛΙΣΣΗΣ ΘΕΟΤΡΟΠΟΥ ΑΓΑΘΟΚΛΕΙΑΣ "of queen Godlike Agathokleia"
Reverse - Pali: Maharajasa tratarasa dhramikasa Agathukriae "Queen Agathokleia, saviour and follower of the dharma"

- Period 2:

Silver: Agathokleia's portrait / walking king forming benediction gesture.
Obverse - Greek: ΒΑΣΙΛΙΣΣΗΣ ΑΓΑΘΟΚΛΕΙΑΣ "of queen Agathokleia"
Reverse - Pali: Maharajasa tratarasa dhramikasa Stratasa "The Great king Strato, saviour and followers of the Dharma"

- Period 3:

Silver: Bust of adolescent Strato / Athena holding Nike.
Obverse - Greek: ΒΑΣΙΛΕΩΣ ΣΩΤΗΡΟΣ ΚΑΙ ΔΙΚΑΙΟΥ ΣΤΡΑΤΩΝΟΣ "of king saviour and just/righteous Strato"
Reverse - Pali: Maharajasa tratarasa Dhramikasa Stratasa "Great saviour king Strato, follower of the Dharma"

- Period 4:

Silver: Adolescent Strato jointly with Agathokleia / Athena Alkidemos left.
Obverse - Greek: ΒΑΣΙΛΕΩΣ ΣΩΤΗΡΟΣ ΣΤΡΑΤΩΝΟΣ ΚΑΙ ΑΓΑΘΟΚΛΕΙΑΣ "of king saviour Strato, and Agathokleia"
Reverse - Pali: Maharajasa tratarasa Stratasa/Agathukriae "Great saviour king Strato, and Agathokleia"

- Period 5-7:

Silver: Strato alone, diademed, helmeted or spear-throwing, sometimes bearded / Athena Alkidemos (left, right or forward).
Bronzes: Heracles / Nike
Obverse - (5-6) Greek: ΒΑΣΙΛΕΩΣ ΣΩΤΗΡΟΣ ΣΤΡΑΤΩΝΟΣ "of king saviour Strato"
(7) Greek: ΒΑΣΙΛΕΩΣ ΣΩΤΗΡΟΣ ΔΙΚΑΙΟΥ ΣΤΡΑΤΩΝΟΣ "of king saviour and Just/Righteous Strato"
Reverse - (5) Pali: Maharajasa tratarasa Stratasa "Great saviour king Strato"
(6) Pali: Maharajasa tratarasa dhramikasa Stratasa "Great saviour king Strato, follower of the dharma"
(7) Pali: Maharajasa tratarasa dhramikasa Stratasa "Great saviour king Strato, follower of the dharma"

- Period 8:

Silver: Middle-aged Strato diademed or helmeted / Athena Alkidemos left.
Bronzes: Apollo / Sacrificial tripod
Obverse - Greek: ΒΑΣΙΛΕΩΣ ΕΠΙΦΑΝΟΥΣ ΣΩΤΗΡΟΣ ΣΤΡΑΤΩΝΟΣ "of king illustrious saviour Strato"
Reverse - Pali: Maharajasa pracachasa tratarasa Stratasa "Great saviour king Strato, the illustrious"

	Greco-Bactrian kings		Indo-Greek kings					
Territories/ dates	West Bactria	East Bactria	Paropamisade	Arachosia	Gandhara	Western Punjab	Eastern Punjab	Mathura
326-325 BCE	Campaigns of Alexander the Great in India						Nanda Empire	
312 BCE	Creation of the Seleucid Empire						Creation of the Maurya Empire	
305 BCE	Seleucid Empire after Mauryan war		Maurya Empire					
280 BCE	Foundation of Ai-Khanoum							
255–239 BCE	Independence of the Greco-Bactrian kingdom Diodotus I		Emperor Ashoka (268-232 BCE)					
239–223 BCE	Diodotus II							
230–200 BCE	Euthydemus I							
200–190 BCE	Demetrius I				Sunga Empire			
190-185 BCE	Euthydemus II							
190–180 BCE	Agathocles			Pantaleon				
185–170 BCE	Antimachus I							
180–160 BCE			Apollodotus I					
175–170 BCE	Demetrius II							
160–155 BCE			Antimachus II					
170–145 BCE	Eucratides I							
155–130 BCE	Yuezhi occupation, loss of Ai-Khanoum	Eucratides II; Plato; Heliocles I	Menander I					
130–120 BCE	Yuezhi occupation		Zoilus I		Agathoclea			Yavanarajya inscription
120–110 BCE			Lysias		Strato I			Yavanarajya inscription
110–100 BCE			Antialcidas		Heliocles II			Yavanarajya inscription
100 BCE			Polyxenus		Demetrius III			Yavanarajya inscription
100–95 BCE			Philoxenus					Yavanarajya inscription
95–90 BCE			Diomedes	Amyntas		Epander		Yavanarajya inscription
90 BCE			Theophilus	Peucolaus		Thraso		Yavanarajya inscription
90–85 BCE			Nicias	Menander II		Artemidorus		Yavanarajya inscription
90–70 BCE			Hermaeus	Archebius				Yavanarajya inscription
			Yuezhi occupation		Maues (Indo-Scythian)			
75–70 BCE				Vonones	Telephus	Apollodotus II		
65–55 BCE				Spalirises		Hippostratus	Dionysius	
55–35 BCE					Azes I (Indo-Scythians)		Zoilus II	
55–35 BCE					Vijayamitra/ Azilises		Apollophanes	
25 BCE – 10 CE				Gondophares	Zeionises	Kharahostes	Strato II; Strato III	
				Gondophares (Indo-Parthian)			Rajuvula (Indo-Scythian)	
			Kujula Kadphises (Kushan Empire)				Bhadayasa (Indo-Scythian)	Sodasa (Indo-Scythian)

== See also ==
- Greco-Buddhism
- Indo-Scythians

== Notes ==
Preceded by Agathokleia	Indo-Greek ruler in Gandhara and Punjab; 125–110 BC	Succeeded by Heliokles II
