= Eucratides I =

Greco-Bactrian king from 172/171 BC to 145 BC

- Great King, Basileus
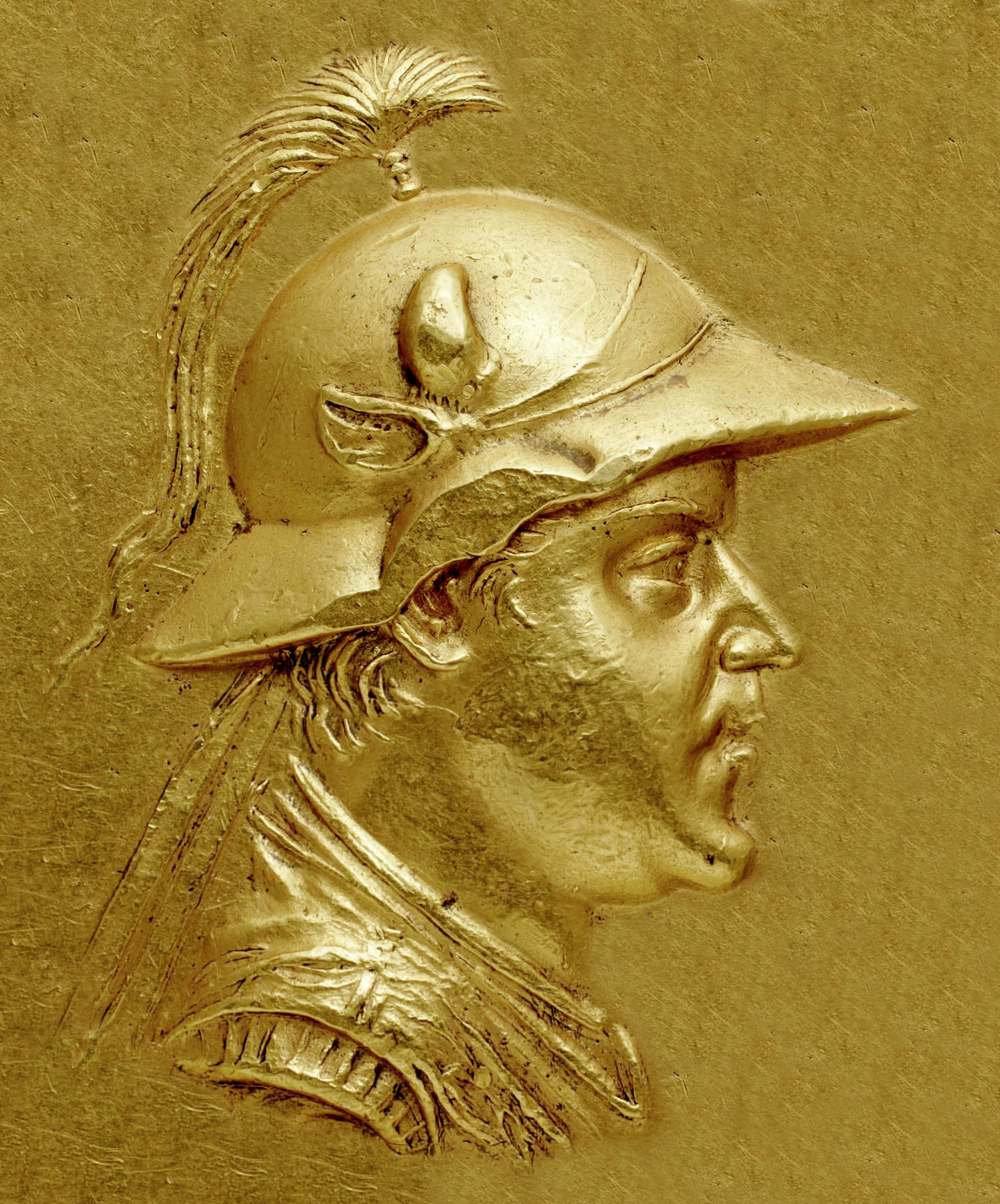
- Effigy of Eucratides wearing a Boeotian style helmet from a gold coin.

King of the Bactrian Empire
- Reign: 171–145 BC
- Predecessor: Euthydemus II
- Successor: Eucratides II
- Successor: Heliocles I
- Born: c. 205 BC
- Died: 145 BC; Bactria
- Issue: Eucratides II (probably son); Heliocles I; Agathoclea (probable daughter)
- Dynasty: Eucratid
- Father: Heliocles
- Mother: Laodice

Eucratides I (Ancient Greek: Εὐκρατίδης, Eukratídēs; Pali: Evukratida; reigned 172/171–145 BC), also known as Eucratides the Great, was one of the most important Greco-Bactrian kings. He conquered large parts of northern India, and minted a vast and prestigious coinage, suggesting a rule of considerable importance and prosperity. His immediate successors were the last Greek kings to rule in Bactria.

== Biography ==
Eucratides was born around 210–205 BC, the son of Heliocles and Laodice as depicted on various finds of his coinage. It is unclear whether he was a Bactrian nobleman who raised a rebellion, or, according to some scholars, a cousin of the Seleucid king Antiochus IV Epiphanes who was trying to regain the Bactrian territory. There has been much speculation on Eucratides' background and parentage. His mother, Laodice, is depicted wearing a royal diadem and therefore of royal descent, while his father is bare-headed. Tarn asserted that Laodice was a Seleucid princess, the daughter of Seleucus II Callinicus. Narain and other modern authors have challenged this established view.

=== Coup d'état ===
Whatever his origins, Eucratides came to power by overthrowing the Euthydemid dynasty in Bactria, possibly when its king, Demetrius was conquering northwestern India. The king whom Eucratides dethroned in Bactria was probably Antimachus I.

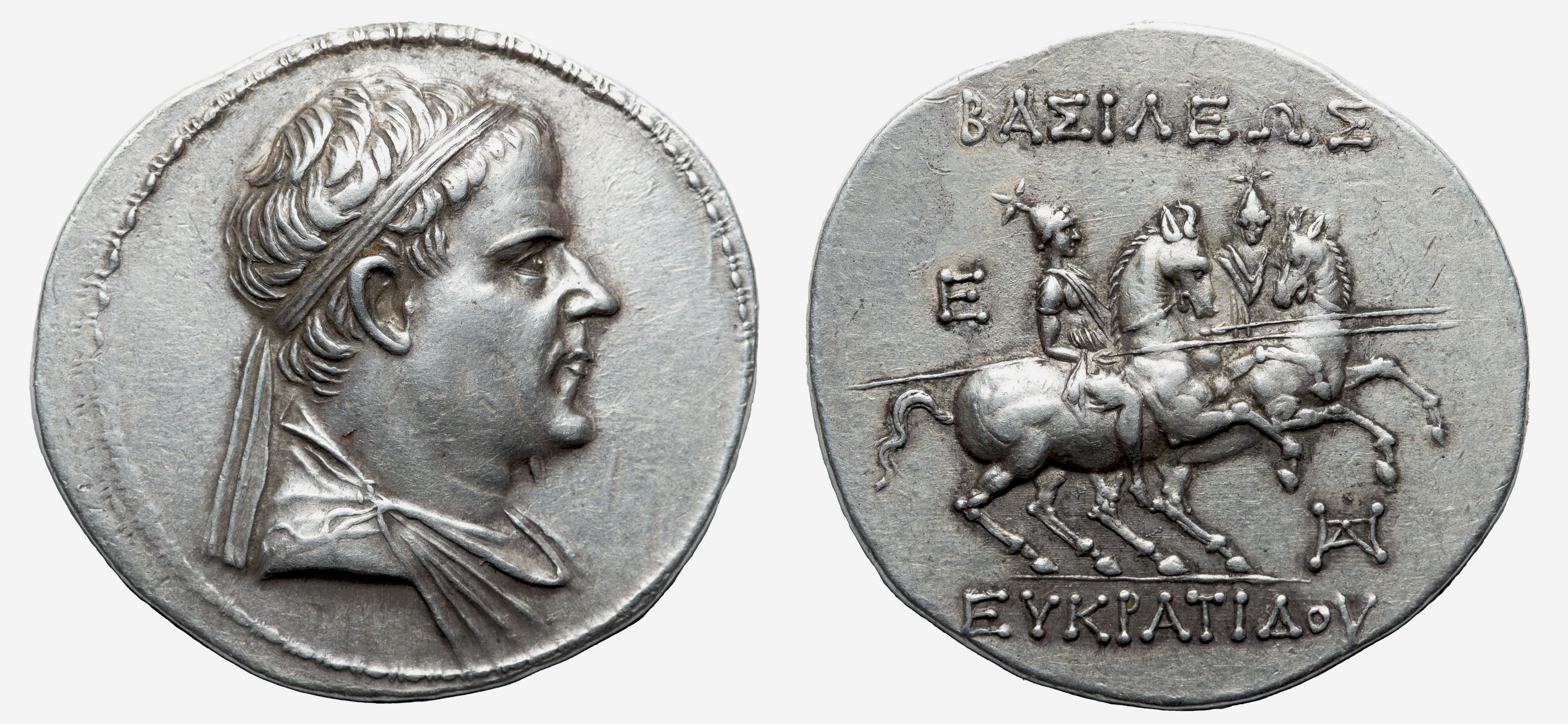
Pentadrachm (5 drachms) of Eucratides I Megas.

Justin explains that Eucratides acceded to the throne at about the same time as Mithridates, whose rule is accurately known to have started in 171 BC, thereby giving an approximate date for the accession of Eucratides:

Almost at the same time that Mithridates ascended the throne among the Parthians, Eucratides began to reign among the Bactrians – Justin, trans. J. S. Watson

Having become master of Bactria after de-throning the Euthydemid dynasty, Eucratides was faced with a Parthian invasion which began when Demetrius I was conquering India. Having taken Tapuria and Margiana from Demetrius in about 170 BC, the powerful Mithridates I attempted to conquer Bactria itself but was checked by Eucratides. Having secured his western borders, Eucratides then conquered parts of India, campaigning as far south as Barigaza (modern day Bharuch), solidifying Greek presence in Northern India with the Indo-Greek Kingdom. According to the single remaining source, Roman historian Justin, Eucratides defeated Demetrius of India, but the identity of this king is uncertain: he could be either Demetrius I, or Demetrius II, but more likely Menander I.

"Eucratides led many wars with great courage, and, while weakened by them, was put under siege by Demetrius, king of the Indians. He made numerous sorties, and managed to vanquish 60,000 enemies with 300 soldiers, and thus liberated after four months, he put India under his rule" Justin XLI,6

Eukratideion
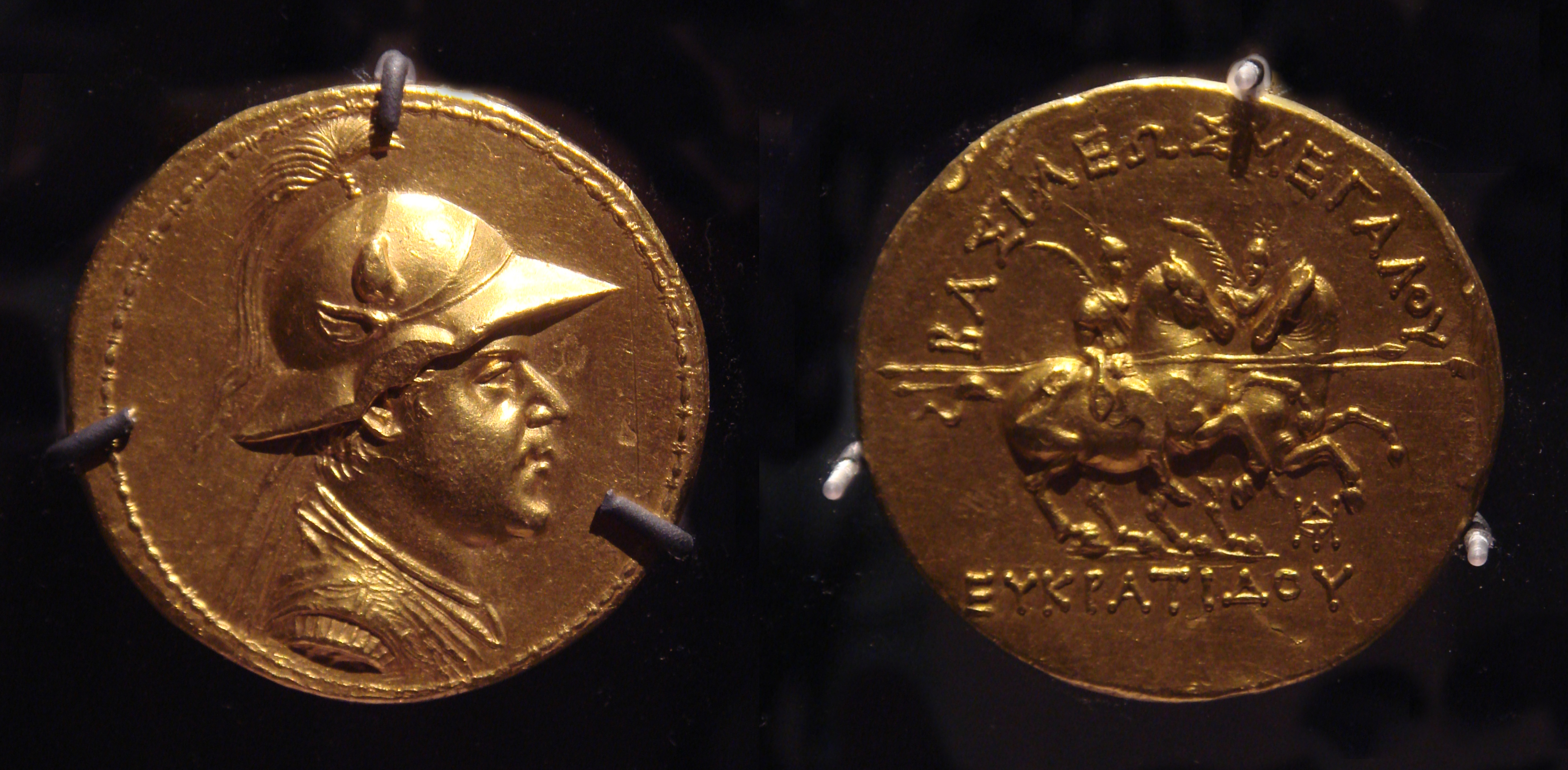
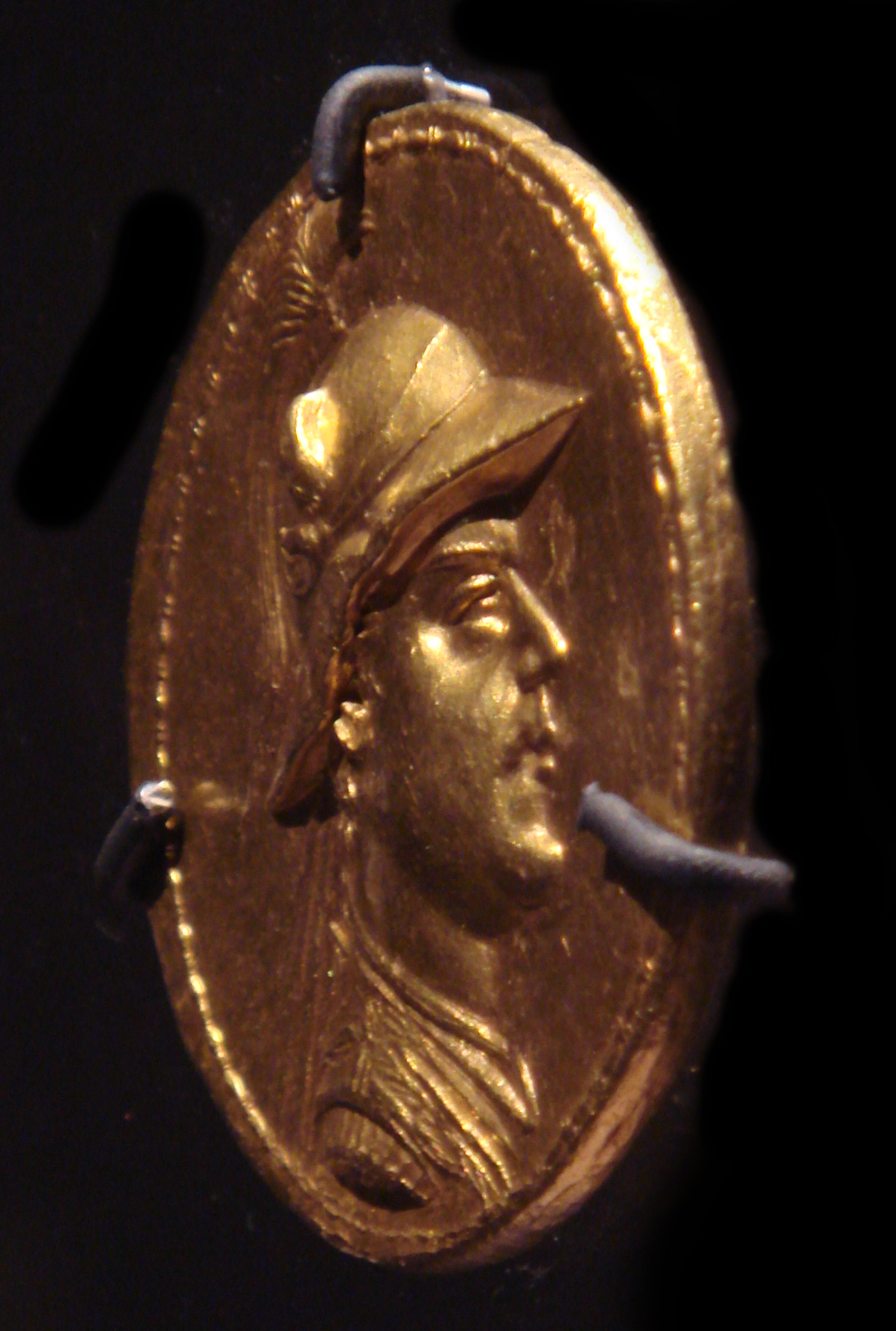
The largest gold coin of Antiquity was minted by Eucratides I: the 20-stater coin of Eucratides weighs 169.2 grams, and has a diameter of 58 millimeters. It was originally found in Bukhara, and later acquired by Napoleon III. Cabinet des Médailles, Paris.

Numismatic evidence suggests that Eucratides I was a contemporary of the Indo-Greek kings Apollodotus I, Apollodotus II and Plato of Bactria. In any case, Eucratides' advances into India are proved by his abundant bilingual coinage that are spread all over northern India and Pakistan.

The city of Eucratideia (Εὐκρατίδεια), which is mentioned by ancient Greek geographers as city of great wealth straddling the Oxus River, was probably named after Eucratides. It might have been a totally new foundation or an existing city which he had renamed after himself. The location of the city is uncertain, but it was probably Ai-Khanoum or perhaps Dilbarjin.

From 162-158 BCE, Eucratides lost the satrapies of Aria and Margiana to Mithridates I of Parthia .

=== Death ===
Justin ends his account of Eucratides' life by claiming that the warlike king was murdered on his way back from India by his son, who hated Eucratides so much that he mutilated and dragged his dead body after his chariot. This may have been a misinterpretation by Justin, and the regicide could instead have been perpetrated by an Euthydemid prince, Demetrius II, the son and successor of Demetrius I. Justin appears to believe Eucratides was killed by his own son, Heliocles I, but this is unlikely as patricide was uncommon in the Hellenistic age.

"As Eucratides returned from India, he was killed on the way back by his son, who ran his chariot over the blood of the king, and ordered the corpse to be left without a sepulture" Justin XLI,6

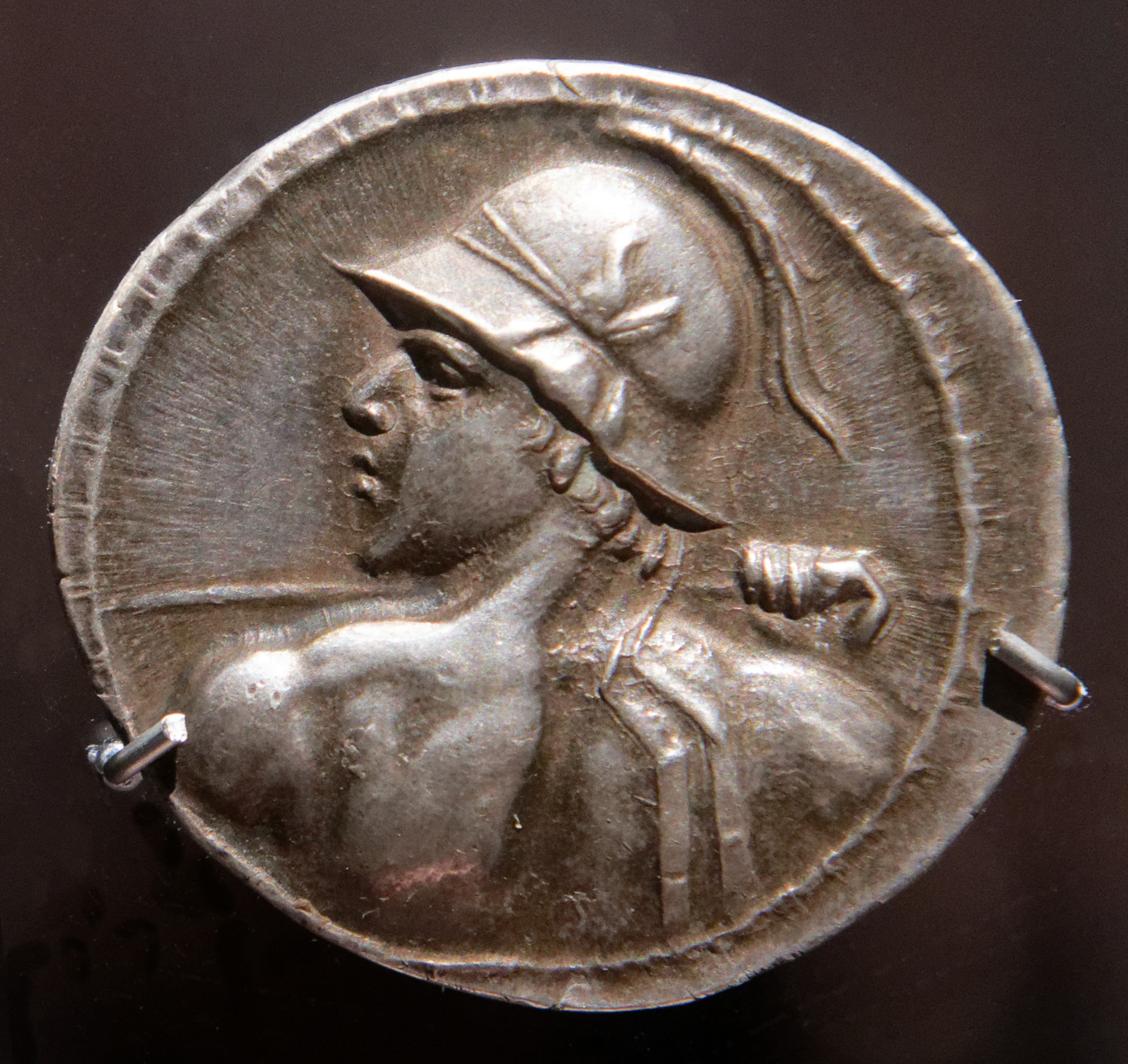
Tetradrachm of Eucratides I, obverse showing him wearing a Boeotian type helmet with a diadem and holding a spear in his right hand.

The murder of Eucratides probably brought about a civil war amongst the members of the dynasty. The successors to Eucratides were Eucratides II and Heliocles I (145–130 BC), who was the last Greek king to reign in Bactria. Once the Yuezhi tribes overpowered Heliocles, the Greco-Bactrians lost control of the provinces north of the Hindu Kush. Other members of the dynasty were Plato of Bactria and probably Demetrius II, who in that case was not identical with the king Justin claimed was the enemy of Eucratides I.

Eucratides was the last known ruler of Ai-Khanoum, which was also his capital city. Ai-Khanoum was a prosperous Greek city in Bactria and excavations in the 20th century showed that it had all the hallmarks of a true Hellenistic city. It was likely destroyed at the end of Eucratides' reign in about 145 BC.

The rule of the Greco-Bactrians soon crumbled following these numerous wars:

"The Bactrians, involved in various wars, lost not only their rule but also their freedom, as, exhausted by their wars against the Sogdians, the Arachotes, the Dranges, the Arians and the Indians, they were finally crushed, as if drawn of all their blood, by an enemy weaker than them, the Parthians." Justin, XLI,6

However, the rule of the Indo-Greeks over territories south of the Hindu Kush lasted for a further 150 years, ultimately collapsing under the pressure of the Yüeh-chih and Scythian (Saka) invasions in around 10 BC, with the last Indo-Greek ruler Strato II.

== Legacy ==
The coinage of Eucratides has been used in the design of some Afghanistan banknotes between 1979 and 2002, and is now in the emblem of the Bank of Afghanistan.

Da Afghanistan Bank which is the central bank of Afghanistan, in its seal has a Eucratides I-era coin having the Greek text, ΒΑΣΙΛΕΩΣ ΜΕΓΑΛΟΥ ΕΥΚΡΑΤΙΔΟΥ (Basileōs Megalou Eukratidou, “Of the great king Eucratides.”)

== Sources ==
Full account of Justin on Eucratides:

"Almost at the same time that Mithridates ascended the throne among the Parthians, Eucratides began to reign among the Bactrians; both of them being great men. But the fortune of the Parthians, being the more successful, raised them, under this prince, to the highest degree of power; while the Bactrians, harassed with various wars, lost not only their dominions, but their liberty; for having suffered from contentions with the Sogdians, the Drangians, and the Indians, they were at last overcome, as if exhausted, by the weaker Parthians. Eucratides, however, carried on several wars with great spirit, and though much reduced by his losses in them, yet, when he was besieged by Demetrius king of the Indians, with a garrison of only three hundred soldiers, he repulsed, by continual sallies, a force of sixty thousand enemies. Having accordingly escaped, after a five months’ siege, he reduced India under his power. But as he was returning from the country, he was killed on his march by his son, with whom he had shared his throne, and who was so far from concealing the murder, that, as if he had killed an enemy, and not his father, he drove his chariot through his blood, and ordered his body to be cast out unburied."

— Justin, Epitome of the Philippic History of Pompeius Trogus, XLI 6.1-5, IIe CE.

== Gallery ==
Eucratides issued many different coin designs, such as dynastic coins with what looks like his parents, normal Attic coins and also square Indian coins with legends in Greek and Pali language.

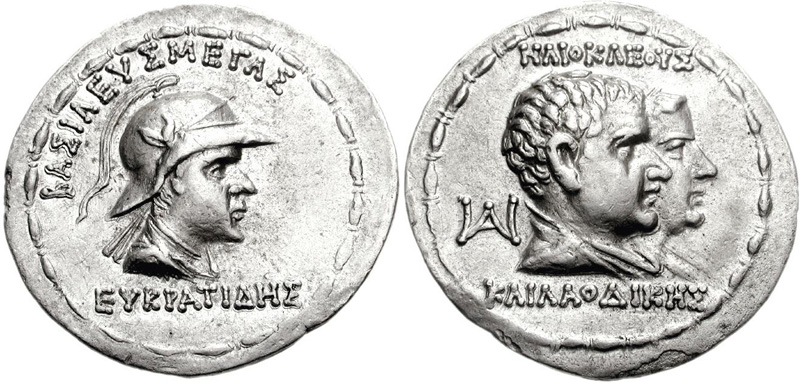
Coin of Eucratides with parents Heliocles and Laodice. Greek legends: ΒΑΣΙΛΕΥΣ ΜΕΓΑΣ ΕΥΚΡΑΤΙΔΗΣ, "Great King Eucratides", and ΗΛΙΟΚΛΕΟΥΣ ΚΑΙ ΛΑΟΔΙΚΗΣ, "Son of Heliocles and Laodice".

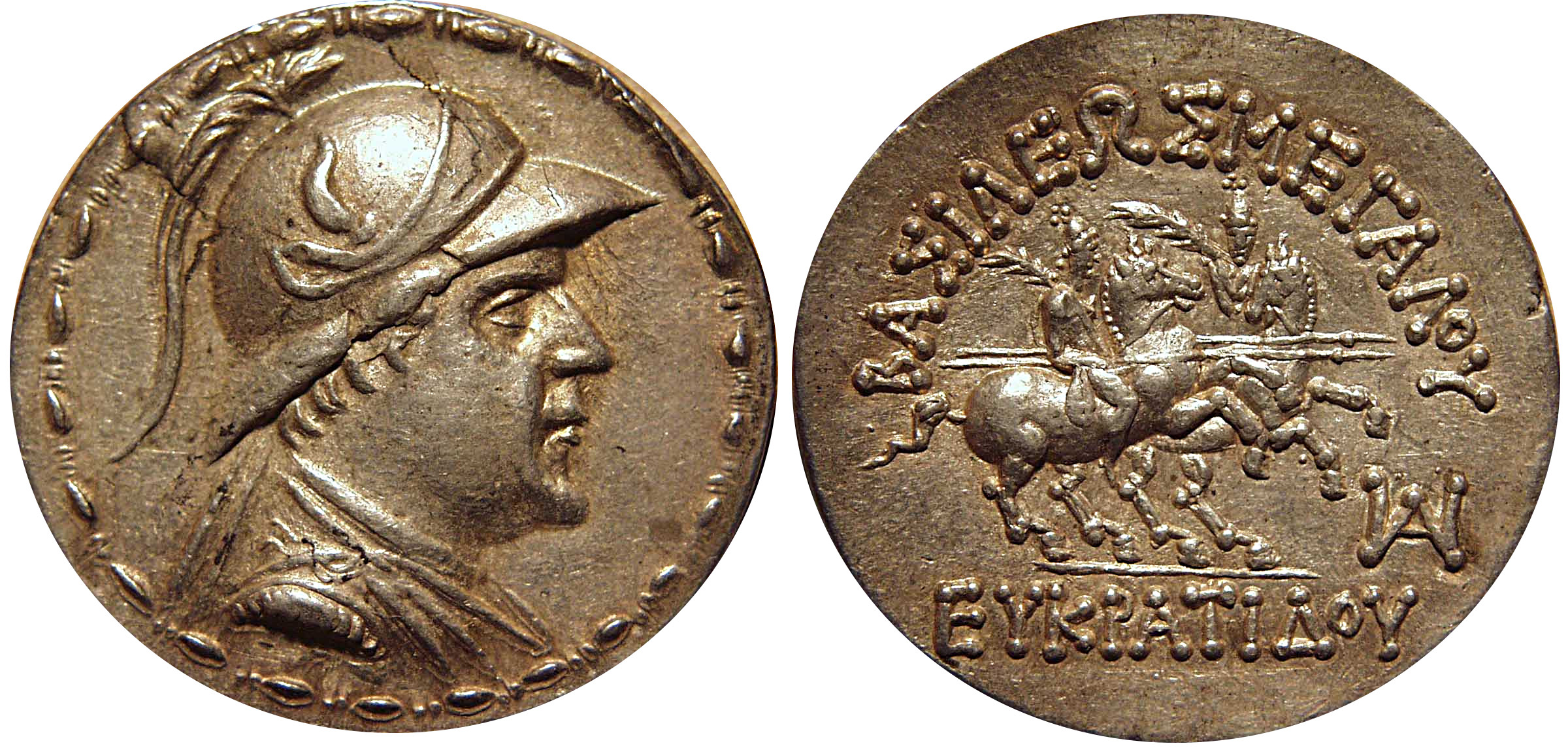
Silver Tetradrachm of king Eucratides I wearing a helmet decorated with bull's horn and ear. Reverse shows the Dioscuri on horseback. Greek legend: ΒΑΣΙΛΕΩΣ ΜΕΓΑΛΟΥ ΕΥΚΡΑΤΙΔΟΥ, Basileōs Megalou Eukratidou, "Of Great King Eucratides".

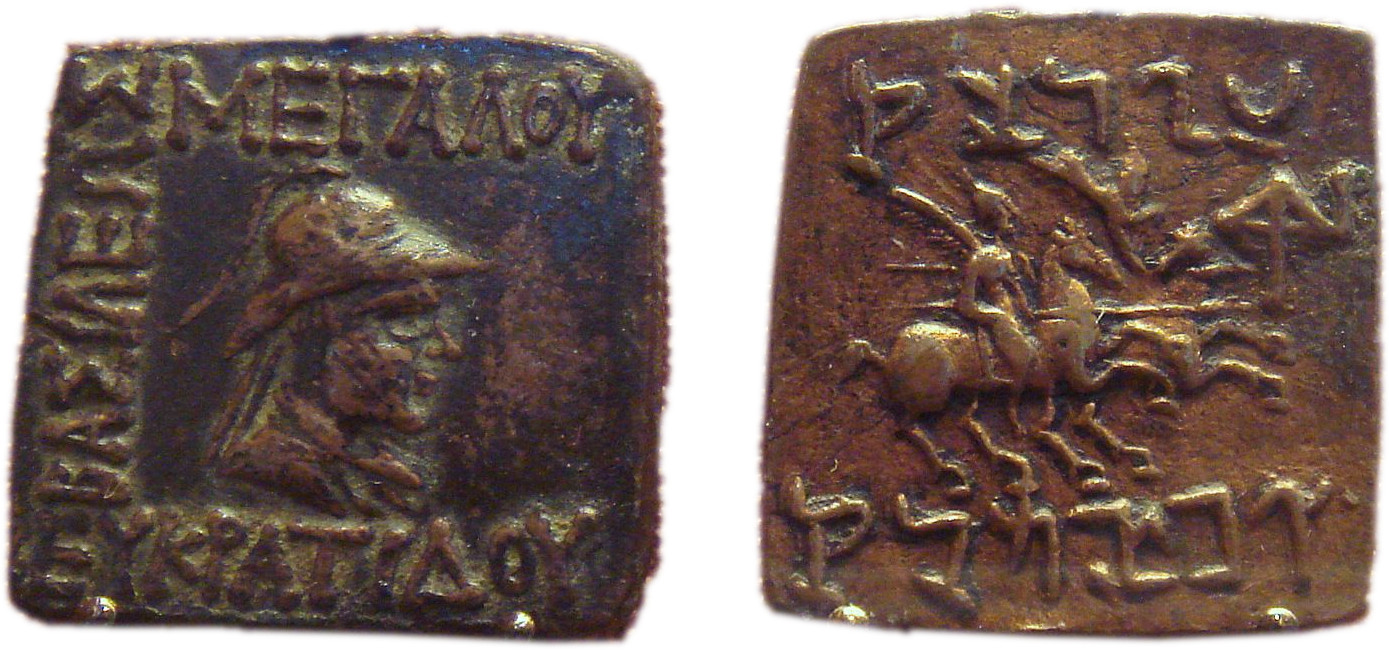
Bilingual coin of Eucratides in the Indian standard. Greek on the obverse: ΒΑΣΙΛΕΩΣ ΜΕΓΑΛΟΥ ΕΥΚΡΑΤΙΔΟΥ, "Of Great King Eucratides". Pali in the Kharoshthi script on the reverse.

== See also ==
- History of Afghanistan
- Heliocles I

== Notes ==
	Greco-Bactrian kings		Indo-Greek kings					
Territories/ dates	West Bactria	East Bactria	Paropamisade	Arachosia	Gandhara	Western Punjab	Eastern Punjab	Mathura
326-325 BCE	Campaigns of Alexander the Great in India						Nanda Empire	
312 BCE	Creation of the Seleucid Empire						Creation of the Maurya Empire	
305 BCE	Seleucid Empire after Mauryan war		Maurya Empire					
280 BCE	Foundation of Ai-Khanoum							
255–239 BCE	Independence of the Greco-Bactrian kingdom Diodotus I		Emperor Ashoka (268-232 BCE)					
239–223 BCE	Diodotus II							
230–200 BCE	Euthydemus I							
200–190 BCE	Demetrius I				Sunga Empire			
190-185 BCE	Euthydemus II							
190–180 BCE	Agathocles			Pantaleon				
185–170 BCE	Antimachus I							
180–160 BCE			Apollodotus I					
175–170 BCE	Demetrius II							
160–155 BCE			Antimachus II					
170–145 BCE	Eucratides I							
155–130 BCE	Yuezhi occupation, loss of Ai-Khanoum	Eucratides II; Plato; Heliocles I	Menander I					
130–120 BCE	Yuezhi occupation		Zoilus I		Agathoclea			Yavanarajya inscription
120–110 BCE			Lysias		Strato I			Yavanarajya inscription
110–100 BCE			Antialcidas		Heliocles II			Yavanarajya inscription
100 BCE			Polyxenus		Demetrius III			Yavanarajya inscription
100–95 BCE			Philoxenus					Yavanarajya inscription
95–90 BCE			Diomedes	Amyntas		Epander		Yavanarajya inscription
90 BCE			Theophilus	Peucolaus		Thraso		Yavanarajya inscription
90–85 BCE			Nicias	Menander II		Artemidorus		Yavanarajya inscription
90–70 BCE			Hermaeus	Archebius				Yavanarajya inscription
			Yuezhi occupation		Maues (Indo-Scythian)			
75–70 BCE				Vonones	Telephus	Apollodotus II		
65–55 BCE				Spalirises		Hippostratus	Dionysius	
55–35 BCE					Azes I (Indo-Scythians)		Zoilus II	
55–35 BCE					Vijayamitra/ Azilises		Apollophanes	
25 BCE – 10 CE				Gondophares	Zeionises	Kharahostes	Strato II; Strato III	
				Gondophares (Indo-Parthian)			Rajuvula (Indo-Scythian)	
			Kujula Kadphises (Kushan Empire)				Bhadayasa (Indo-Scythian)	Sodasa (Indo-Scythian)
