= Zoilus II =

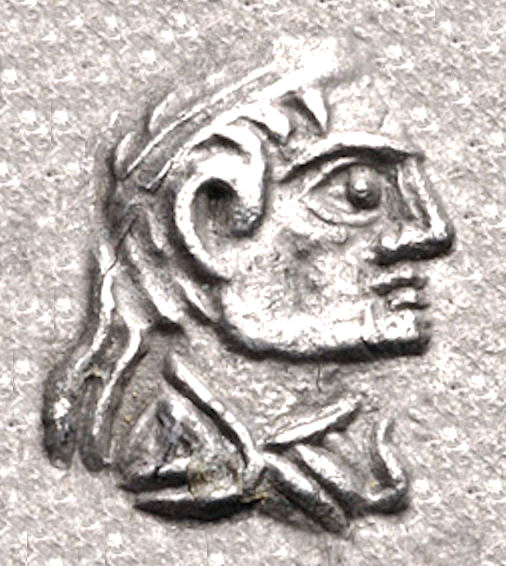
- Portrait of Zoilus II

Indo-Greek king
- Reign: 55–35 BC

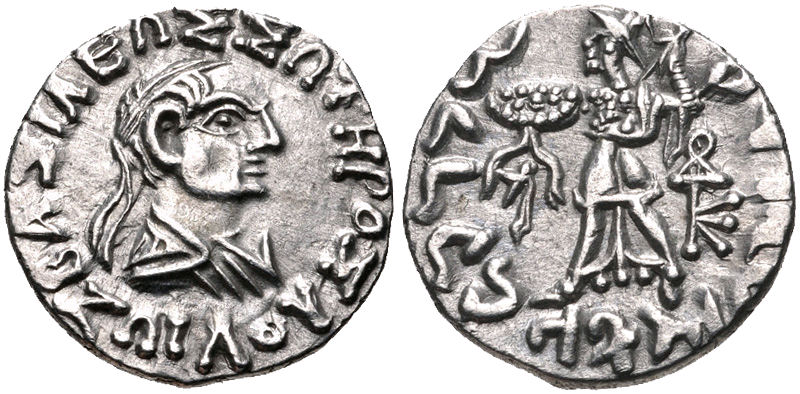
Coin of Zoilus II, as a balding man. Obv: Bust of Zoilus with Greek legend ΒΑΣΙΛΕΩΣ ΣΩΤΗΡΟΣ ΖΩΙΛΟΥ "Of King Zoilos the Saviour". Rev: Athena advancing left, with thunderbolt and shield covered with aegis (type of Menander I). Kharosthi legend: MAHARAJASA TRATARASA JHOILASA "King Zoilus the Saviour".

Zoilus II Soter (Ancient Greek: Ζωΐλος Σωτήρ, romanized: Zōïlos Sōtēr; epithet means "the Saviour") was an Indo-Greek king who ruled in eastern Punjab. Bopearachchi dates his reign to c. 55–35 BC, a date approximately supported by R. C. Senior. It is possible that some of his coins were issued by a separate king, Zoilus III.

== Rule ==
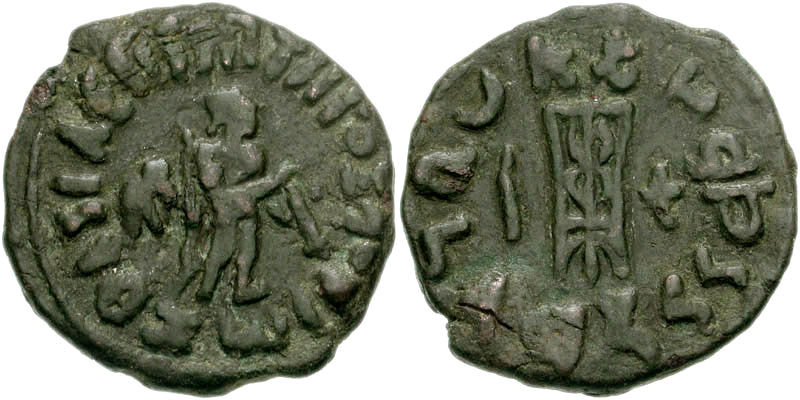
Coin of Zoilus II, with Apollo and small elephant behind him. Tripod on the reverse.

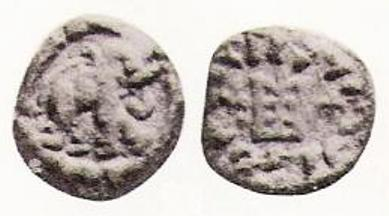
Elephant and tripod.

Zoilus seems to have been one of the rulers who succeeded the last important Indo-Greek king Apollodotus II in the eastern parts of his former kingdom. All these kings use the same symbol as Apollodotus II, the fighting Pallas Athene introduced by Menander I, and usually also the same epithet Soter (Saviour). It is therefore possible that they belonged to the same dynasty, and Zoilus II could also have been related to the earlier king Zoilus I, but the lack of written sources make all such conjections uncertain.

He may have been the Bactrian ally of Mark Antony and Cleopatra VII referred to by Virgil in his vision of the Battle of Actium in :

Hinc ope barbarica variisque Antonius armis,
victor ab Aurorae populis et litore rubro,
Aegyptum viresque Orientis et ultima secum
Bactra vehit.

— Virgil, The Aeneid, 8.688
Translation:

Antony, with barbarous wealth and strange weapons, conqueror of eastern peoples and the Indian shores, bringing Egypt,
and the might of the Orient, with him, and furthest Bactria.

=== Coinage ===
Zoilus II issued silver drachms with diademed portrait and Pallas Athene in rather crude style, and two sorts of bronzes in various denominations: "Apollo, with tripod and small elephant", and "Elephant and tripod".

=== Zoilus III, a separate king? ===
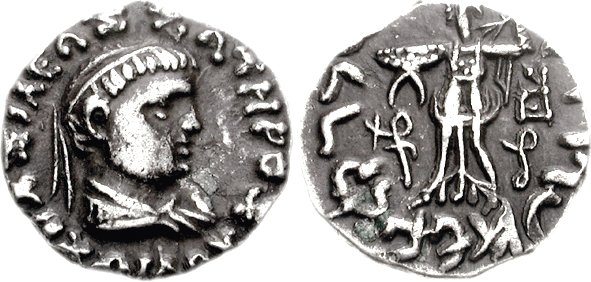
Coin of full-haired Zoilus with later "boxy" mint-mark, hypothesized to be Zoilus III. Obv: Bust of king with Greek legend ΒΑΣΙΛΕΩΣ ΣΩΤΗΡΟΣ ΖΩΙΛΟΥ "Of King Zoilos the Saviour". Rev: Athena advancing left, with thunderbolt and shield covered with aegis (type of Menander I). Kharosthi legend: MAHARAJASA TRATARASA JHOILASA "King Zoilus the Saviour".

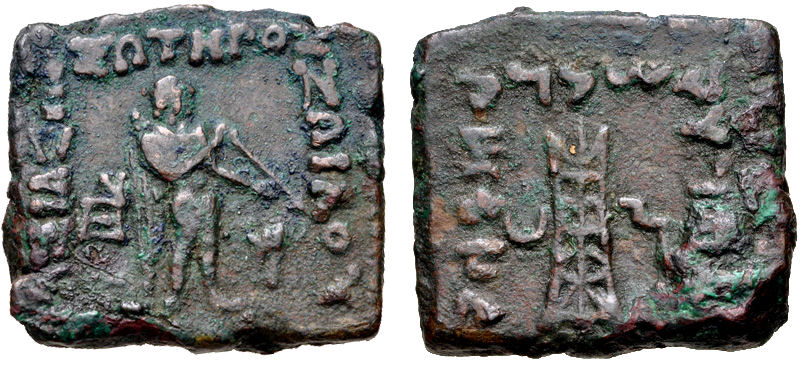
Zoilus II Indian-standard coin with "boxy" mint-mark, possibly characteristic of Zoilus III. Obv Standing god Apollo, holding an arrow and a bow.Rev Tripod.

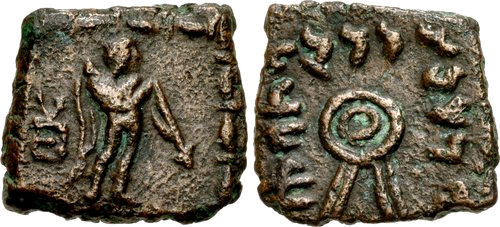
Monolingual coin of Zoilus II Soter with "boxy" mint-mark. Obv Standing Apollo with bead and reel border. Rev Diadem with Kharoshthi legend "Maharajasa tratarasa Jhahilasa" (Saviour King Zoilus).

The portraits attributed to Zoilus II could be divided into two groups; one depicting a balding man with hollow cheeks, the other a seemingly younger man with a fringe and round cheeks. As numismatic evidence indicates that the younger portraits are later, recent research has suggested that they be attributed to a younger king, Zoilus III Soter, who would then have been a son and successor of the older Zoilos.

In particular, the mint mark which is characteristic of the coins of Zoilos with a full head of hair, is a later mint mark used down to the last Indo-Greek kings Strato II and Strato III, suggesting a later reign for Zoilus III. This mint-mark however was never used by the "balding" Zoilus II, or by any king before him.

==== Indo-Scythian imitations ====
The Indo-Scythian king Bhadayasa also copied coins of Zoilus II, or the hypothetical Zoilus III, only mentioning his own name on the Kharoshthi legend of his coins.

The "boxy" mint mark characteristic of Zoilus III and later Indo-Greek kings.

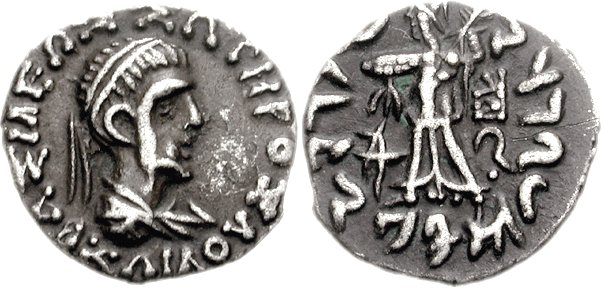
Another coin of the proposed Zoilus III.

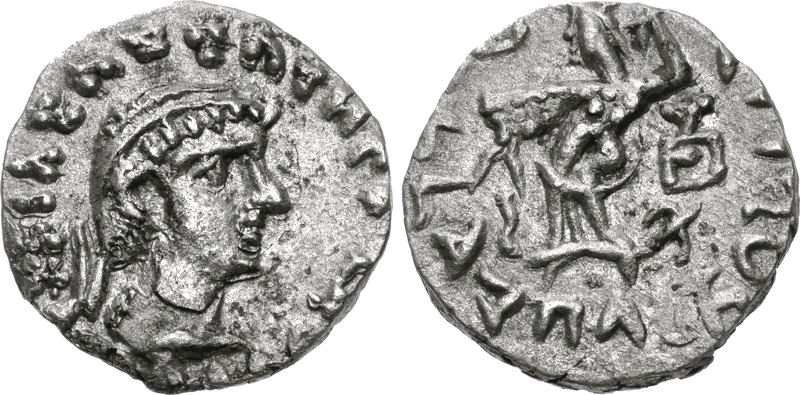
Coin of Bhadayasa, an imitation of the proposed Zoilus IIII.

=== Monograms ===
Many of the monograms on the coins of Zoilus II are in Kharoshti, indicating that they were probably made by an Indian moneyer. This is a characteristic of several of the Indo-Greek kings of the eastern Punjab, such as Strato I, Apollodotus II, and sometimes Apollophanes and Dionysios. Furthermore, the monogram is often identical on their coins, indicating that the moneyer, or the place of mint, were the same.

The coins of Zoilus II combine Greek monograms with Kharoshthi ones, indicating that some of the celators may have been native Indians. The Kharoshthi monograms are the letters for: sti, ji, ra, ga, gri, ha, stri, ri, bu, a, di, stra, and śi. The "Apollo and tripod" and "Elephant and tripod" types only have Kharoshthi monograms, while the portrait types usually have combinations of Greek and Kharoshthi monograms. The monogram 62 (below) has been shown to be the last Indo-Greek monogram, and only appears on the younger portraits that may belong to Zoilus III.

=== Findspots ===
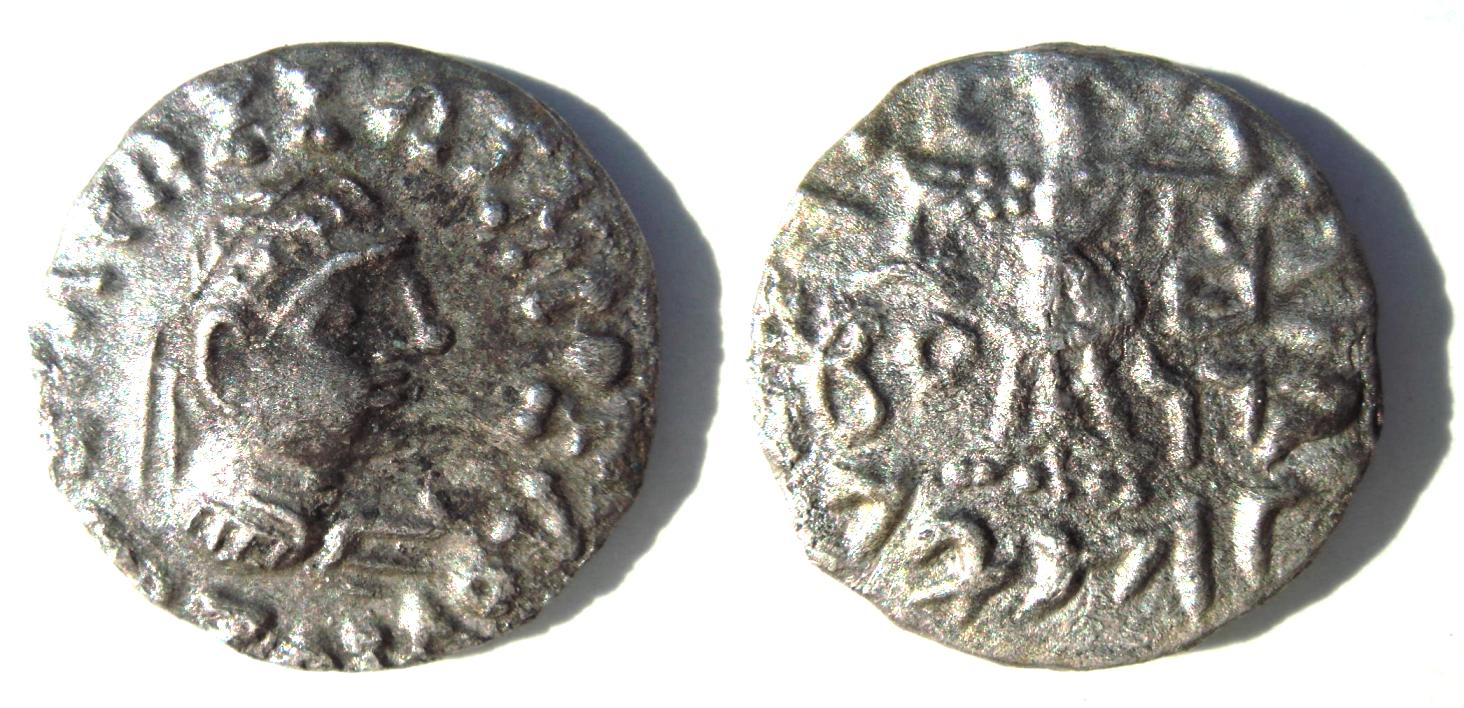
Coin of Zoilus II/III, younger portrait.

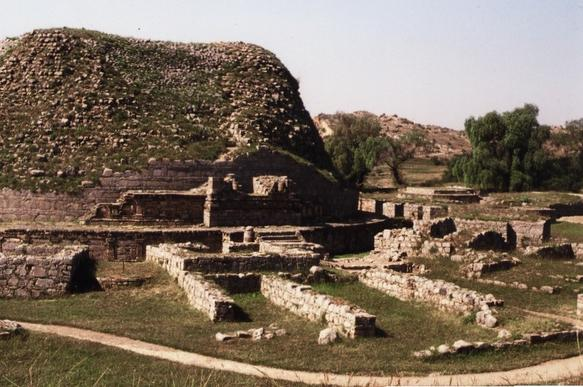
Coins of Zoilus II were found under a peripheral stupa in the Dharmarajika Buddhist monastery.

The coins of Zoilus II have been found in the Sutlej and Sialkot II hoards, and in Punjab hoards east in the Jhelum (Bopearachchi, p138).

Also, 25 coins of Zoilus II were found under the foundations of a 1st-century BC rectangular chapel in the monastery of Dharmarajika, near Taxila.

Two coins of Zoilus II were also found in the Bara hoard near Peshawar, together with coins of the Indo-Scythian kings Azes I, Azilises, Azes II.

=== Overstrikes ===
A coin of Zoilus II was overstruck on a coin of Apollodotus II.

== See also ==
- Greco-Bactrian Kingdom
- Seleucid Empire
- Greco-Buddhism
- Indo-Scythians
- Indo-Parthian Kingdom
- Kushan Empire

== Notes ==
| Preceded by Dionysios | Indo-Greek Ruler (in Eastern Punjab); 55 – 35 BC | Succeeded by Apollophanes |

| | Greco-Bactrian kings | | Indo-Greek kings | | | | | |
| Territories/ dates | West Bactria | East Bactria | Paropamisade | Arachosia | Gandhara | Western Punjab | Eastern Punjab | Mathura |
| 326-325 BCE | Campaigns of Alexander the Great in India | | | | | | Nanda Empire | |
| 312 BCE | Creation of the Seleucid Empire | | | | | | Creation of the Maurya Empire | |
| 305 BCE | Seleucid Empire after Mauryan war | | Maurya Empire | | | | | |
| 280 BCE | Foundation of Ai-Khanoum | | | | | | | |
| 255–239 BCE | Independence of the Greco-Bactrian kingdom Diodotus I | | Emperor Ashoka (268-232 BCE) | | | | | |
| 239–223 BCE | Diodotus II | | | | | | | |
| 230–200 BCE | Euthydemus I | | | | | | | |
| 200–190 BCE | Demetrius I | | | | Sunga Empire | | | |
| 190-185 BCE | Euthydemus II | | | | | | | |
| 190–180 BCE | Agathocles | | | Pantaleon | | | | |
| 185–170 BCE | Antimachus I | | | | | | | |
| 180–160 BCE | | | Apollodotus I | | | | | |
| 175–170 BCE | Demetrius II | | | | | | | |
| 160–155 BCE | | | Antimachus II | | | | | |
| 170–145 BCE | Eucratides I | | | | | | | |
| 155–130 BCE | Yuezhi occupation, loss of Ai-Khanoum | Eucratides II; Plato; Heliocles I | Menander I | | | | | |
| 130–120 BCE | Yuezhi occupation | | Zoilus I | | Agathoclea | | | Yavanarajya inscription |
| 120–110 BCE | | | Lysias | | Strato I | | | Yavanarajya inscription |
| 110–100 BCE | | | Antialcidas | | Heliocles II | | | Yavanarajya inscription |
| 100 BCE | | | Polyxenus | | Demetrius III | | | Yavanarajya inscription |
| 100–95 BCE | | | Philoxenus | | | | | Yavanarajya inscription |
| 95–90 BCE | | | Diomedes | Amyntas | | Epander | | Yavanarajya inscription |
| 90 BCE | | | Theophilus | Peucolaus | | Thraso | | Yavanarajya inscription |
| 90–85 BCE | | | Nicias | Menander II | | Artemidorus | | Yavanarajya inscription |
| 90–70 BCE | | | Hermaeus | Archebius | | | | Yavanarajya inscription |
| | | | Yuezhi occupation | | Maues (Indo-Scythian) | | | |
| 75–70 BCE | | | | Vonones | Telephus | Apollodotus II | | |
| 65–55 BCE | | | | Spalirises | | Hippostratus | Dionysius | |
| 55–35 BCE | | | | | Azes I (Indo-Scythians) | | Zoilus II | |
| 55–35 BCE | | | | | Vijayamitra/ Azilises | | Apollophanes | |
| 25 BCE – 10 CE | | | | Gondophares | Zeionises | Kharahostes | Strato II; Strato III | |
| | | | | Gondophares (Indo-Parthian) | | | Rajuvula (Indo-Scythian) | |
| | | | Kujula Kadphises (Kushan Empire) | | | | Bhadayasa (Indo-Scythian) | Sodasa (Indo-Scythian) |
