= Soteira =

Soteira may refer to:

- Soteira (comics), a Morlocks (comics) character.
- Soteira (Greek), sometimes Soteria, the female form of the Greek word Soter meaning a savior or deliverer.
