= Dionysius Soter =

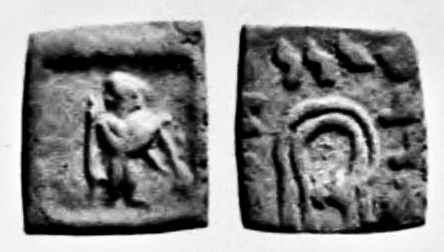
- Coin of Dionysius Soter

Indo-Greek king
- Reign: 65–55 BCE
- Born: c. 86 BCE; Punjab
- Died: 55 BC; Kashmir

Dionysius Soter (Ancient Greek: Διονύσιος Σωτήρ, romanized: Dionysios Sōtēr; epithet means "the Saviour") was an Indo-Greek king in the area of eastern Punjab.

== Reign ==
According to Osmund Bopearachchi, he reigned c. 65–55 BCE and inherited the eastern parts of the kingdom of the important late ruler Apollodotus II. The kings share the same epithet and use the common reverse of fighting Pallas Athene, and it seems plausible that they were closely related, but relationships between the last Indo-Greek kings remain uncertain since the only sources of information are their remaining coins. R. C. Senior dates him approximately ten years later.

Earlier scholars like Professor Ahmad Hasan Dani have dated Dionysius much earlier, between the years 115 and 100 BCE, making him the ruler of the Swat and Dir Valleys and the weak successor of Polyxenus.

Dionysios was probably pressured by the invasions of the Indo-Scythians, and also had to deal with Hippostratus, a more important king who had inherited the western part of the kingdom of Apollodotus II.

Dionysius' name echoes the Olympic wine-god Dionysos, who according to Greek mythology was also an ancient king of India.

== Coins of Dionysios ==
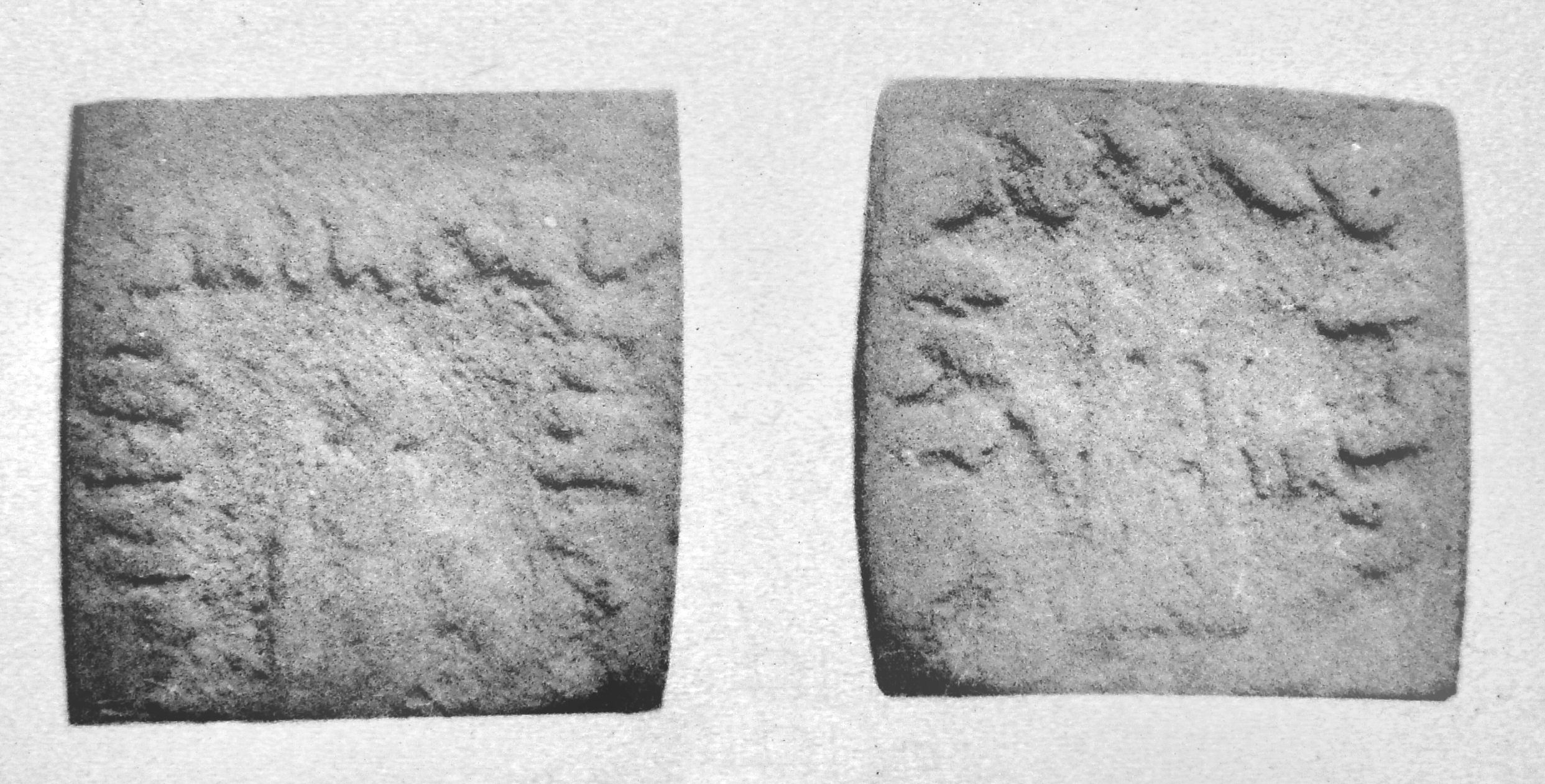
Coins of Dionysius.

The "boxy" mint mark characteristic of later Indo-Greek kings was first used by Dionysius Soter.

Dionysius was the first in the line of late kings who issued only silver drachms, but no tetradrachms, which was likely due to his limited resources. On their obverse is a diademed portrait of the king, with Athena Alcidemus on the reverse.

He also issued bronzes with Apollo on the reverse and a tripod on the obverse. Both these types were inherited from Apollodotus II. The quality of the portraits is inferior to most earlier kings. According to Bopearachchi, Dionysius inherited only the inferior celators of Apollodotus II, which he associates with mints in eastern Punjab.

=== Mint-marks ===
One single coin of Dionysius Soter is known to have used the "boxy" mint-mark characteristic of the last Indo-Greek kings, down to Apollophanes, Strato II and Strato III, who used it exclusively of any other. He is also the first king known to have used this mint-mark, which therefore came to be during his reign.

== See also ==
- Greco-Bactrian Kingdom
- Greco-Buddhism
- Indo-Scythians
- Indo-Parthian Kingdom
- Kushan Empire

== Bibliography ==
- Monnaies Gréco-Bactriennes et Indo-Grecques, Osmund Bopearachchi, Bibliothèque Nationale de France.
- The Bactrian and Indus-Greeks, Ahmed Hasan Dani, Lahore Museum.
- The Indo-Greeks Revisited and Supplemented, A.K. Narain, BR Publishing Corporation.

Preceded by Apollodotus II	Indo-Greek Ruler (in Eastern Punjab); 65 – 55 BC	Succeeded by Zoilus II

	Greco-Bactrian kings		Indo-Greek kings					
Territories/ dates	West Bactria	East Bactria	Paropamisade	Arachosia	Gandhara	Western Punjab	Eastern Punjab	Mathura
326-325 BCE	Campaigns of Alexander the Great in India						Nanda Empire	
312 BCE	Creation of the Seleucid Empire						Creation of the Maurya Empire	
305 BCE	Seleucid Empire after Mauryan war		Maurya Empire					
280 BCE	Foundation of Ai-Khanoum							
255–239 BCE	Independence of the Greco-Bactrian kingdom Diodotus I		Emperor Ashoka (268-232 BCE)					
239–223 BCE	Diodotus II							
230–200 BCE	Euthydemus I							
200–190 BCE	Demetrius I				Sunga Empire			
190-185 BCE	Euthydemus II							
190–180 BCE	Agathocles			Pantaleon				
185–170 BCE	Antimachus I							
180–160 BCE			Apollodotus I					
175–170 BCE	Demetrius II							
160–155 BCE			Antimachus II					
170–145 BCE	Eucratides I							
155–130 BCE	Yuezhi occupation, loss of Ai-Khanoum	Eucratides II; Plato; Heliocles I	Menander I					
130–120 BCE	Yuezhi occupation		Zoilus I		Agathoclea			Yavanarajya inscription
120–110 BCE			Lysias		Strato I			Yavanarajya inscription
110–100 BCE			Antialcidas		Heliocles II			Yavanarajya inscription
100 BCE			Polyxenus		Demetrius III			Yavanarajya inscription
100–95 BCE			Philoxenus					Yavanarajya inscription
95–90 BCE			Diomedes	Amyntas		Epander		Yavanarajya inscription
90 BCE			Theophilus	Peucolaus		Thraso		Yavanarajya inscription
90–85 BCE			Nicias	Menander II		Artemidorus		Yavanarajya inscription
90–70 BCE			Hermaeus	Archebius				Yavanarajya inscription
			Yuezhi occupation		Maues (Indo-Scythian)			
75–70 BCE				Vonones	Telephus	Apollodotus II		
65–55 BCE				Spalirises		Hippostratus	Dionysius	
55–35 BCE					Azes I (Indo-Scythians)		Zoilus II	
55–35 BCE					Vijayamitra/ Azilises		Apollophanes	
25 BCE – 10 CE				Gondophares	Zeionises	Kharahostes	Strato II; Strato III	
				Gondophares (Indo-Parthian)			Rajuvula (Indo-Scythian)	
			Kujula Kadphises (Kushan Empire)				Bhadayasa (Indo-Scythian)	Sodasa (Indo-Scythian)
