= Soter =

Greek epithet, savior, given to Zeus and other gods

Soter derives from the Ancient Greek epithet Σωτήρ (Sōtḗr), meaning a saviour, a deliverer. The feminine form is Soteira (Σώτειρα, Sṓteira) or sometimes Soteria (Σωτηρία, Sōtería).

Soter was used as:

- A title of gods: Poseidon Soter, Zeus Soter, Dionysus Soter, Apollo Soter, Hades Soter, Helios Soter, Athena Soteira, Asclepius Soter, Persephone Soteira, Artemis Soteira and Hecate Soteira.
- The name of a distinct mythical figure, Soter (daimon)
- An epithet of several Hellenistic rulers
- A title of liberators (see also eleutherios (disambiguation)
- A title of Jesus of Nazareth, which came into use some time after the death of Paul the Apostle, most particularly in the fish acronym
- The term "God our Saviour" (Greek: θεῷ σωτῆρι ἡμῶν, dative) occurs several times in the New Testament, in the Epistle of Jude, 1 Timothy and Titus.
- Pope Soter, r. ca. 167 – 174.

== List of People given the epithet of Soter ==
=== Hellenistic Rulers ===
Name	Description	Dedication	Dates	Ref
Antigonus I Monophthalmus	King of the Antigonid empire	Liberating Athens from Cassander	382–301 BC	
Ptolemy I Soter	King and Pharaoh of Egypt		323–283 BC	
Antiochus I Soter	King of the Seleucid Empire	Defeating the Gallic invasion of Anatolia	281 –261 BC	
Diodotus I Soter	King of Bactria		c. 255 – c. 235 BC	
Attalus I Soter	King of Pergamon		241–197 BC	
Seleucus III Ceraunus	King of the Seleucid Empire	Postumus	226/225 – 223 BC	
Demetrius I Soter	King of the Seleucid Empire		161–150 BC	
Menander I Soter	Indo-Greek King		c. 165/155 –130 BC	
Strato I Soter	Indo-Greek King		125–110 BCE	
Polyxenos Epiphanes Soter	Indo-Greek King		c. 100 BC	
Diomedes Soter	Indo-Greek King		95–90 BC	
Hermaeus Soter	Indo-Greek King		90–70 BC	
Dionysius Soter	Indo-Greek King		65–55 BC	
Ptolemy IX Soter	King and Pharaoh of Egypt		116–107 BC, 88–81 BC	
Strato II Soter	Indo-Greek King		25 CE – 10 AD	
Rabbel II Soter	King of Nabataea		70–106 AD	

=== Roman Period ===
Name	Description	Dedication	Dates	Ref
Titus Quinctius Flamininus	Proconsul in the east	Laconia	198-194 BC	
Lucius Cornelius Sulla	Proconsul of the east	Boeotia	87–85 BC	
Lucius Licinius Murena	Legatus in the east	Caria	83/82 BC?	
Quintus Caecilius Metellus	Proconsul in the east	Attica	c.68–62 BC	
Pompey the Great	Governor of Asia	Samos, Lesbos, Keos	67–61 BC	
Publius Cornelius Sulla		Caria	67 BC	
Lucius Antonius	Propraetor of Asia	Pergamon	50/49 BC	
Gaius Julius Caesar	Roman dictator	Ephesus, Pergamon, Lesbos, Megara	49–44 BC	
Quintus Fufius Calenus	General	Olympia	48/47 BC	
Cato the Younger	Propraetor of Africa	Utica	46 BC	
Marcus Junius Brutus	Proconsul of Macedonia, Achaia, Illyricum and Asia	Oropos	44–42 BC	
Marcus Junius Silanus	Proquaestor in Achaea and Macedonia	Attica	34–32 BC	
Octavianus	Roman emperor	Boeotia	30-27 BC	
Marcus Vipsanius Agrippa	Governor of the east	Corfu, Lesbos	19–13 BC	
Gaius Marcius Censorinus	Proconsul of Asia	Mylasa	c. 2 AD	
Germanicus	Governor of the east	Phrygia	17–19 AD	
Gaius Trebonius Proculus Mettius Modestus	Legatus pro praetore of Lycia et Pamphylia,	Lycia	99–102 AD	
Quintus Pompeius Falco	Proconsul of Asia	Phrygia	c.123–128 AD	

== See also ==
- Hellenistic religion
- Messiah
- Soteria (disambiguation)
- Soteriology, the study of salvation; in Christian contexts, the branch of Christology dealing with Jesus' capacity as Saviour of humankind
- Sozusa (disambiguation)

== Notes ==
8.Roman Emperors are excluded from this list as nearly all were granted the epithet of soter.
