= Sozusa =

Sozusa (Σώζουσα Sōzousa) is a byname given to several ancient cities called Apollonia after the sun god (from Apollo's byname Σωτήρ Soter "saviour"), among these :

- Apollonia, Cyrenaica, later bishopric and now Latin titular see called Sozusa in Libya; modern (Mars-)Susa, Libya
- Sozusa in Palaestina, a city and in the late Roman province of Palaestina Prima, now a now Latin titular see

Sozusa may also refer to:

- Sozusa (moth), a genus of moth

== See also ==
- Apollonia (disambiguation)
