= Dharmarajika Stupa =

Ancient Buddhist stupa and archaeological site in Punjab, Pakistan

- دھرم راجک اسٹوپا (Urdu)
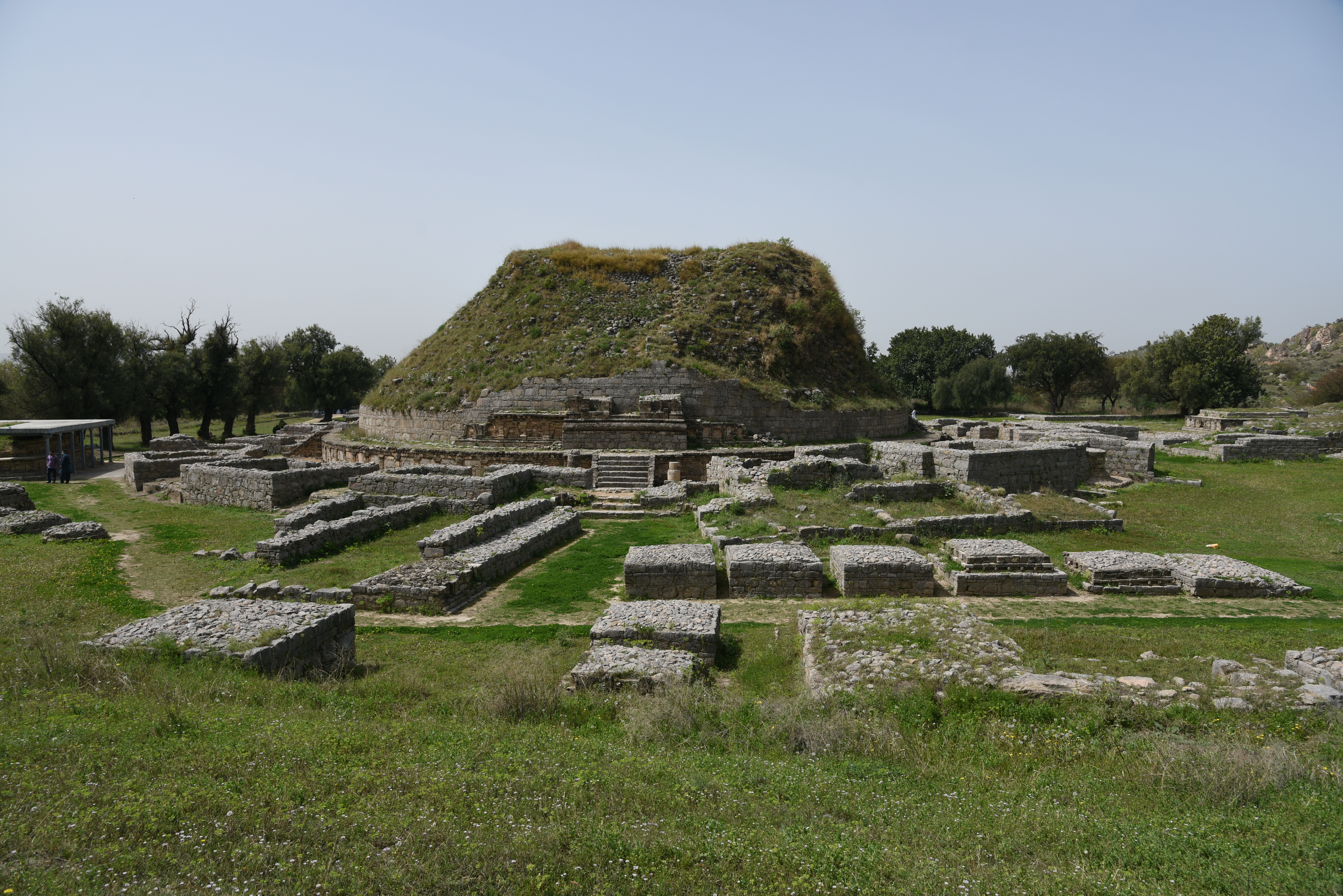
- The Dharmarajika Stupa, Taxila

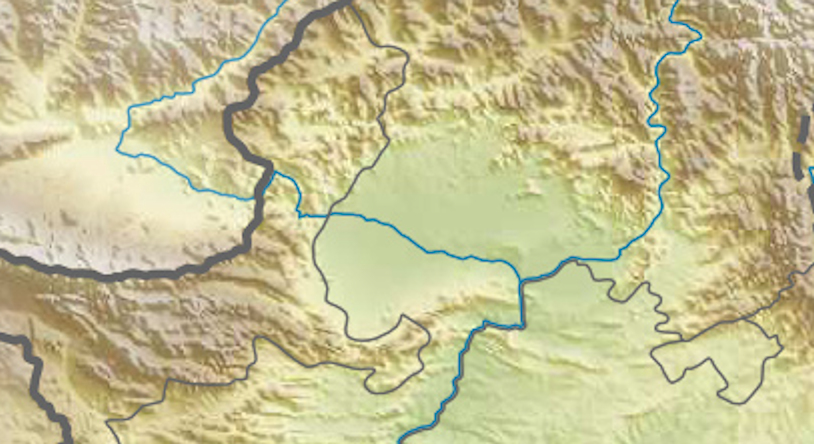
- Location within Pakistan Location within Gandhara
- 33.73°N 72.78°E
- Type: Monastery
- Location: Taxila Cantonment, Punjab
- Part of: Taxila Ruins

History
- Built: 3rd century BCE

Site notes
- Archaeologists: Sir John Marshall

UNESCO World Heritage Site
- Official name: Taxila
- Criteria: iii, iv
- Designated: 1980
- Reference no.: 139

The Dharmarajika Stupa (Punjabi, Urdu: دھرم راجک اسٹوپا), also referred to as the Great Stupa of Taxila, is a Buddhist stupa near Taxila, Pakistan. It was built over the relics of the Buddha by Ashoka, the Emperor of Magadha, in the 3rd century BCE. The stupa, along with the large monastic complex that later developed around it, forms part of the Ruins of Taxila - which were inscribed as a UNESCO World Heritage Site in 1980.

== History ==
It is believed that the Dharmarajika Stupa was built over the remains of an even older stupa that had been built by the Mauryan emperor King Ashoka in the 3rd century BCE The stupa was believed to have been reestablished in the 2nd century CE during the Kushan era in order to house relics of the Buddha, which may have been sourced from earlier monuments. Buddhist texts mention that frankincense was used during religious services at Dharmarajika, while the complex was paved with colourful glass tiles. Indo-Greek coins found at the site date from the 2nd century BCE, suggesting earliest possible establishment of a religious monument at the site.

Small stupas that predate the main stupa are found throughout the Dharmarajika site, and surrounded an earlier core stupa in an irregular layout. It is known that the earlier core stupa contained a pathway for circumambulation that was made of plaster, and decorated with shell bangles in geometric patterns. The earlier stupa likely had four gates in axial directions.

The site came under control of Persian Sassanid rule, and suffered a period of stagnation. Large-scale developments took place during the late Kushan and Kidarite era which added numerous monasteries and stupas to the site.

=== Destruction ===
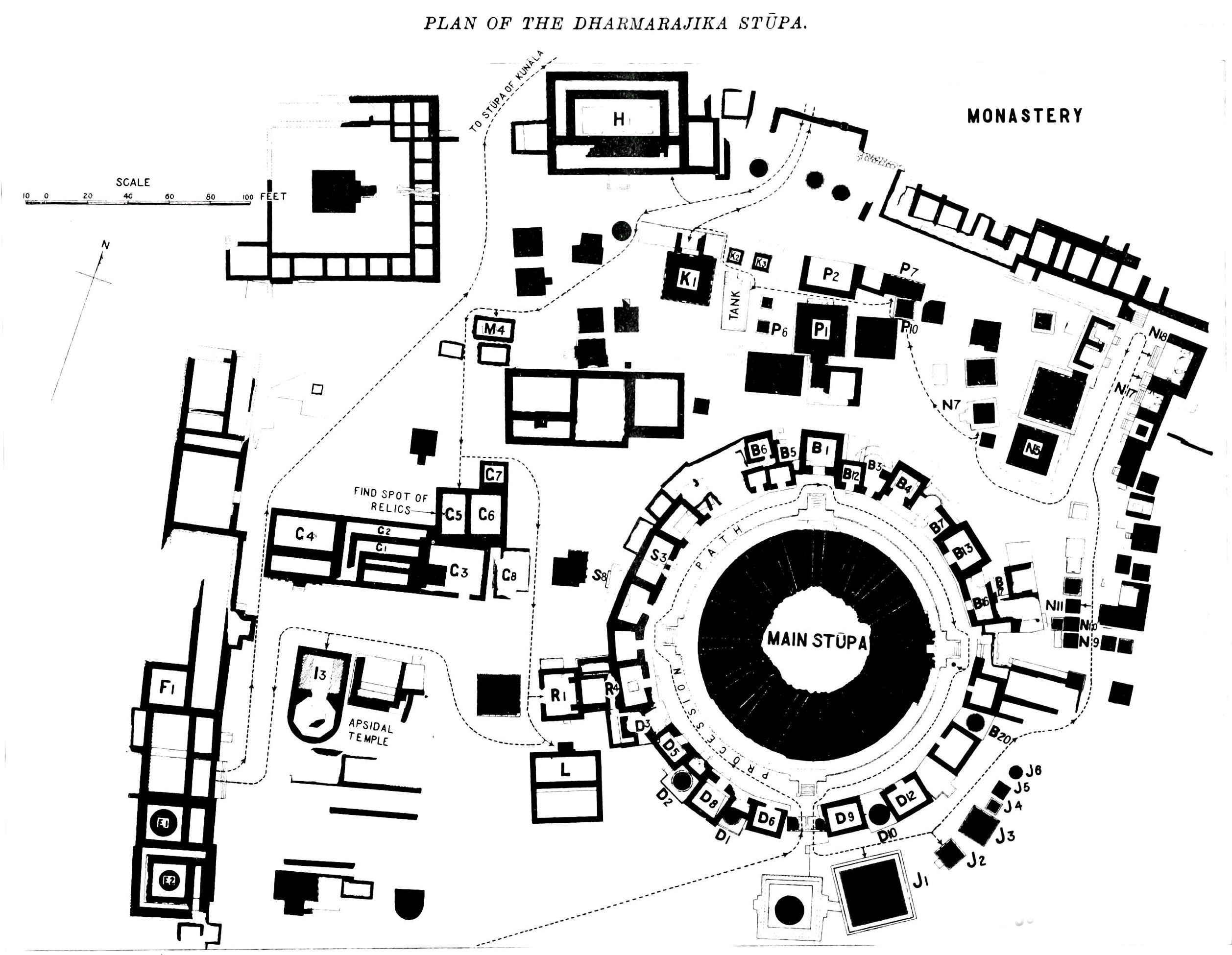
Plan of the Dharmarajika Stupa.

The site was devastated by the White Huns in the 5th century CE, and then abandoned. Subsequent rulers, such as the Hun king Mihirakula, persecuted the region's Buddhists. Under his reign, over a thousand Buddhist monasteries throughout Gandhara are said to have been destroyed. The White Huns destroyed not only Taxilan sites, but also devastated nearby Peshawar.

=== Excavation ===
The stupa was excavated by Sir John Marshall in 1913. The stupa had been looted several times prior to Marshall's discovery, and was badly damaged. Marshall noted that a large trench, requiring tremendous effort, was built at some point in the past in order to loot the stupa's precious relics. By 1934, enough of the site had been uncovered that the site's scale could be appreciated. Human skeletons were discovered in the open area immediately south of the stupa, and may be the remains of monks who were killed during the invasion of the White Huns.

== Layout ==
The location of the stupa and its monastic community about one kilometre outside of Sirkap is in conformity with the Buddha's recommendation that monasteries should be neither "too far" nor "too close" to adjacent towns. Three distinctive types of masonry in the buildings around the main stupa suggest the contributions of different periods to the building activity.

=== Core stupa ===
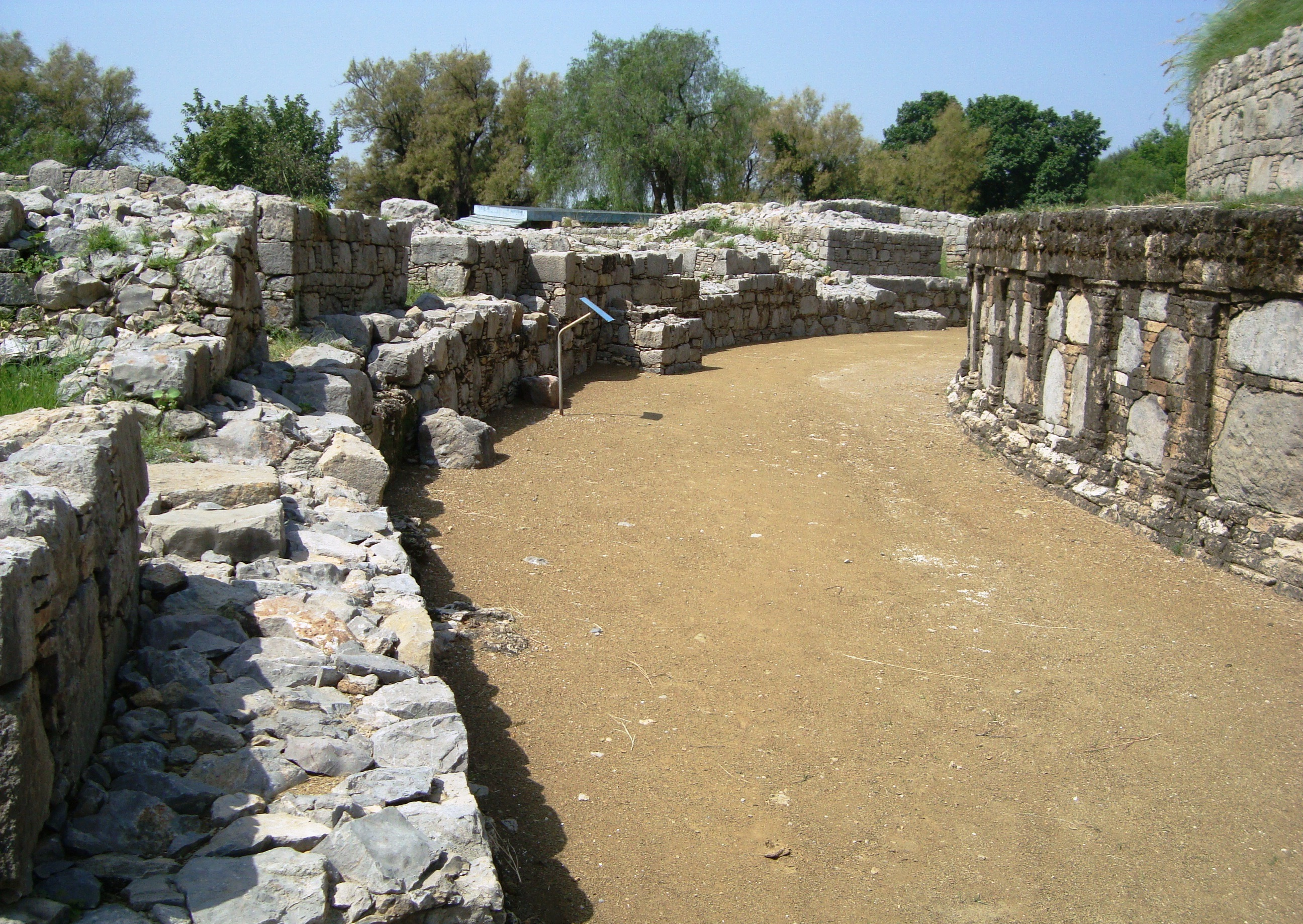
The passageway between the main stupa and several smaller stupas was used for the practice of pradakshina.

Dharmarajika Stupa is the largest of all stupas in the Taxila region, Surrounding the main mound is a passageway for pradakshina — the ancient practice of walking around a holy site.

The stupa's large anda, or hemispherical mound, is damaged − though the plinth of the mound, known as the medhi, is still largely intact. The anda mound was made of ashlar stone. The stupa's harmika, or fence like structure built atop the anda mound, has been lost.

The stupa's southern gateway was initially considered the most important, though the construction of four smaller stupas (termed G7, G8, S7, Q1) to the west of the stupa indicate that this then likely became the preferred entrance for those performing circumambulation. Later constructions around the "Eastern Avenue" then shifted the preferred route for circumambulation to the eastern side of the stupa.

Before entering the main sacred areas, visitors to the shrine from Sirkap would pass through a large building, now termed building H, that would openly display relics. Visitors likely venerated the relics at building H before entering the main stupa area.

=== Peripheral stupas ===
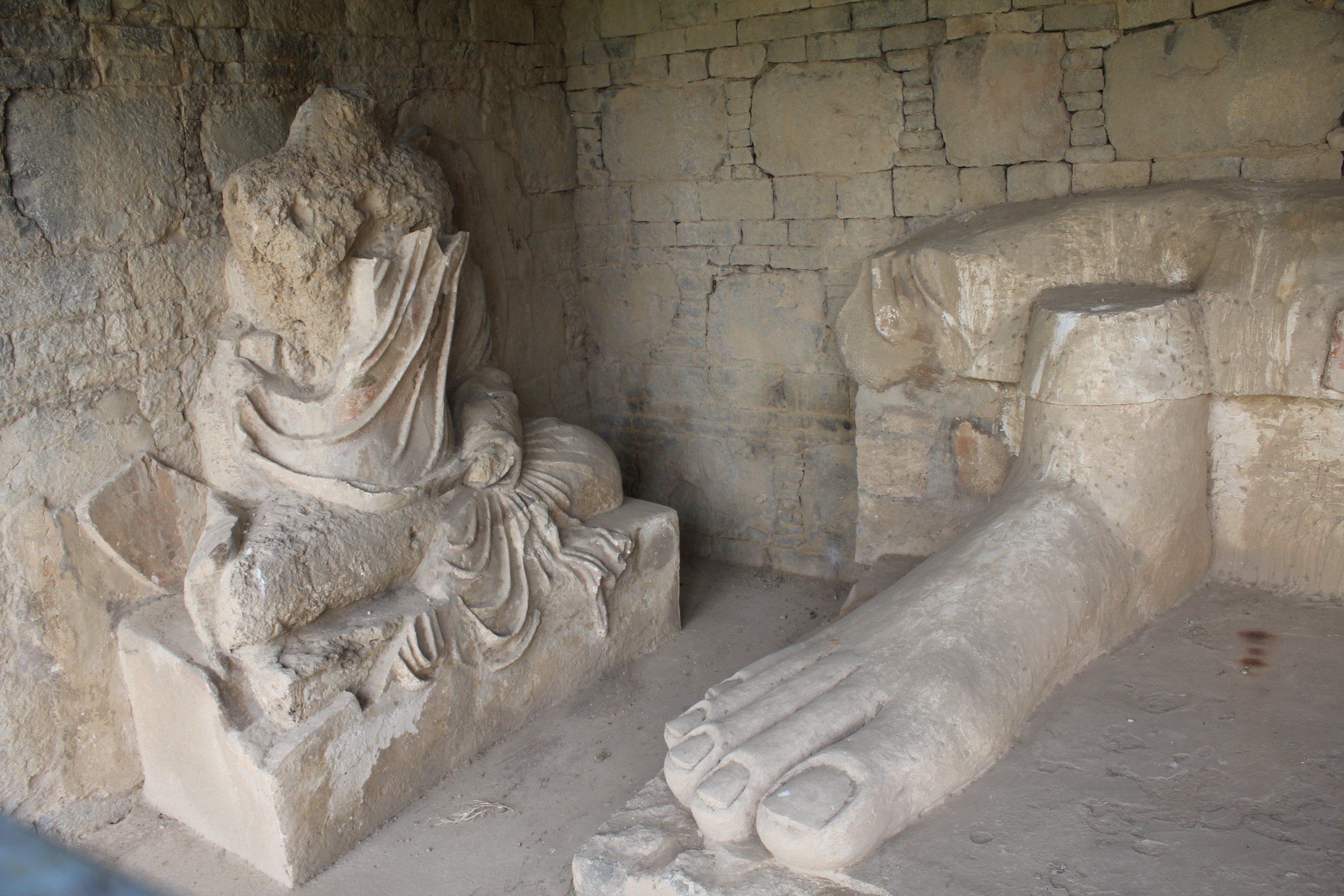
Chambers containing religious imagery were built along the "Northern Avenue".

The stupa was surrounded by a circle of smaller stupas which were built approximately 200 years after the main stupa's construction, and were likely constructed together as part of a project funded by a single patron.

Additional stupas were built further along the northern portion of the site by various patrons, and date from the Indo-Scythian period. These stupas form a "Northern Avenue," that had several small shrines with devotional images, rendering the Northern Avenue a processional corridor. Devotional images were likely relegated to the periphery of the complex due to religious conservatives, who were hesitant to fully embrace the new practice of using imagery in religious practice.

Unlike constructions at Sanchi, stupas around the Dharmarajika Stupa were built by individual donors, rather than as part of a communal effort.

=== Monasteries ===
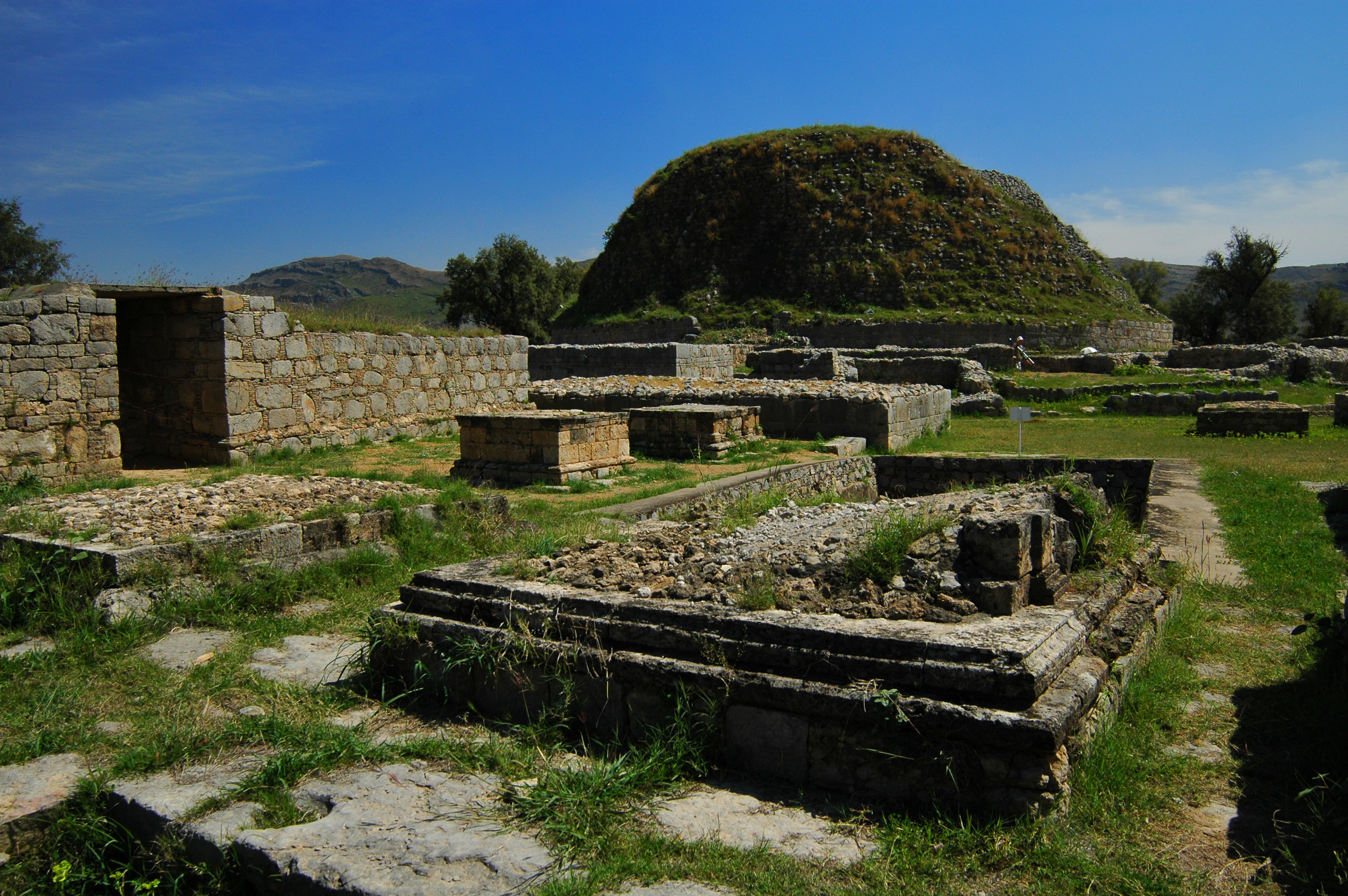
Ruins of several monasteries are located around the main stupa.

Early monastic cells near the stupa were built as a row of rooms, with a verandah, The verandah style was later dropped in favour of monastic living quarters surrounding quadrangles that were built immediately north, northeast, and east of the stupa approximately 300 years after the stupa's construction.

The northern monastery consisted of two courtyards that were each built around a large stupa. The smaller eastern courtyard is believed to have housed 13 monks.

Monastery G, located immediately west of the stupa has at least 50 monastic cells, a stupa, and was likely multistoried. Monastery M in the extreme northwest section of the site, and contained its own stupa in a small courtyard. Monastery M is connected to a long residential monastery, oriented in a roughly north-south direction. At the southern edge of this monastery are the remains of two stupas, now termed E1 and E2. E1 was built in a pre-existing cell, while E2 was a more elaborated stupa that contained a small passageway for circumambulation. Neither stupa was likely open to the public.

== Relics ==
=== Bone fragments of the Buddha ===
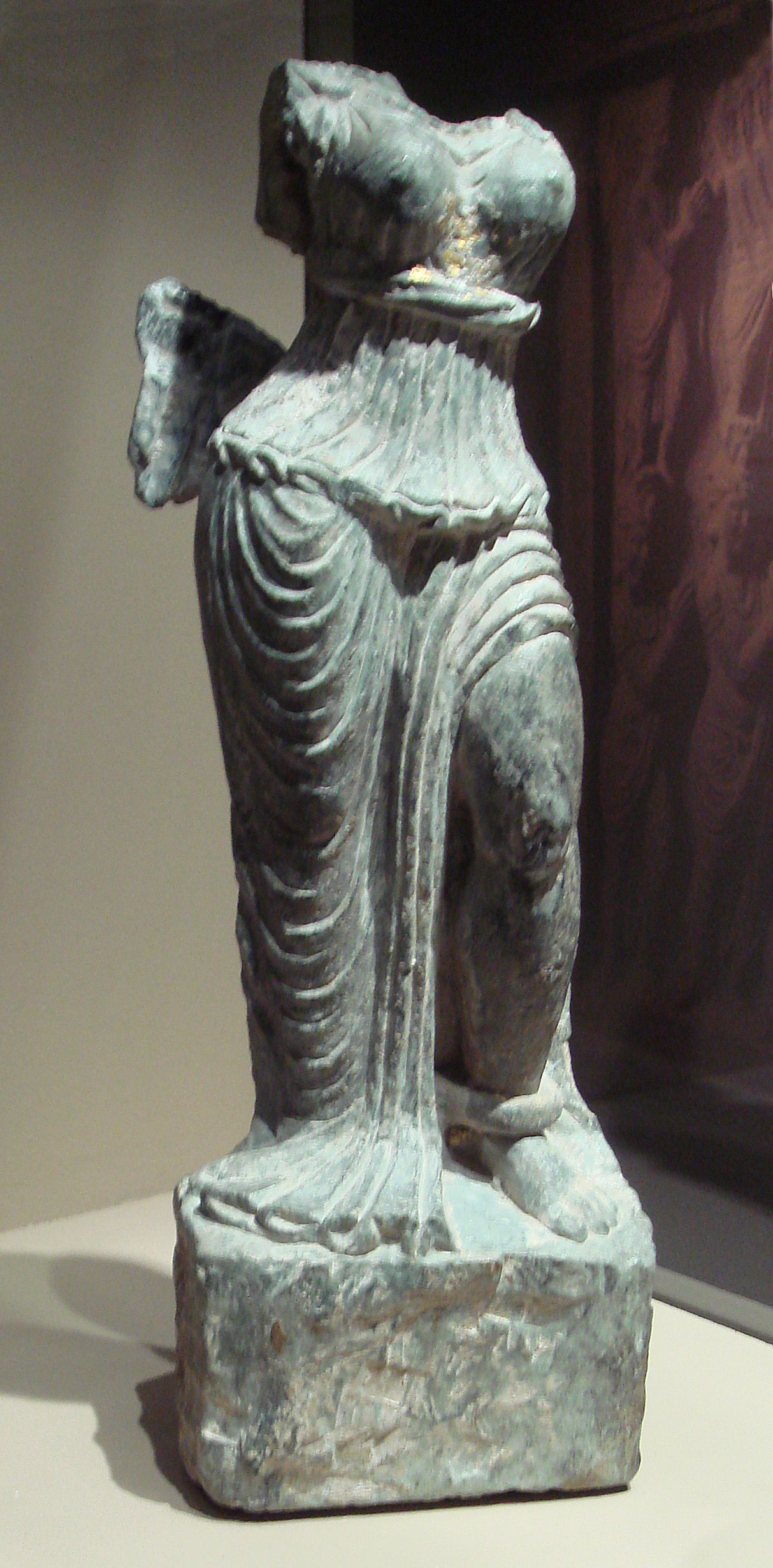
Statuette from the Dharmarajika site, now displayed at the Taxila Museum in Taxila.

The site is famous for its bone relics – thought to be those of the Buddha, Much of the stupa's precious relics had been looted by the time it was discovered by Sir John Marshall. A silver casket containing a silver inscription was recovered from the stupa's chapel after discovery, The inscription is written in the ancient Kharosthi script that was once common throughout Gandhara, The inscription states that Urusaka of Noacha placed bone relics of the Buddha in his chapel at Dharmarajika in 78 CE.

In 2016, 2 bone relics from the Dharmarajika Stupa were sent to Sri Lanka for one month. The relics were displayed at important shrines in Polonnaruwa, Colombo, Kandy, and Anuradhapura, and attracted 9.3 million visitors.

=== Reliquary vessels ===
18 reliquary vessels were also recovered from smaller stupas surrounding the Dharmarajika Stupa that yielded a wide array of relics, including one that encased a cylindrical piece of gold. Other reliquaries yielded gold jewelry and precious jewels, while others contained items from distant locations such as lapis lazuli from Afghanistan, pearls, and shells − reflecting the large trade networks operating from Taxila. Several coins of the Indo-Greek king Zoilos II were found under the foundation of such a 1st-century BCE stupa.

== Etymology ==
The name Dharmarajika comes from Dharmaraja, a name given to Buddha who was the true Dharma Raja (Lord of Law), according to Marshall. It is also believed that ‘Dharmarajika’ is derived from the word ‘Dharmaraja’, a title used by Mauryan emperor Ashoka. The stupa is also popularly known as Chir Tope, or "Scarred hill".

== Access ==
The Dharmarajika Stupa lies about 3 kilometers east of the Taxila Museum, along the PMO Colony Road, northeast of Taxila Cantonment. The stupa was located near the ancient city of Sirkap, which also forms part of the Ruins of Taxila.

== Gallery ==
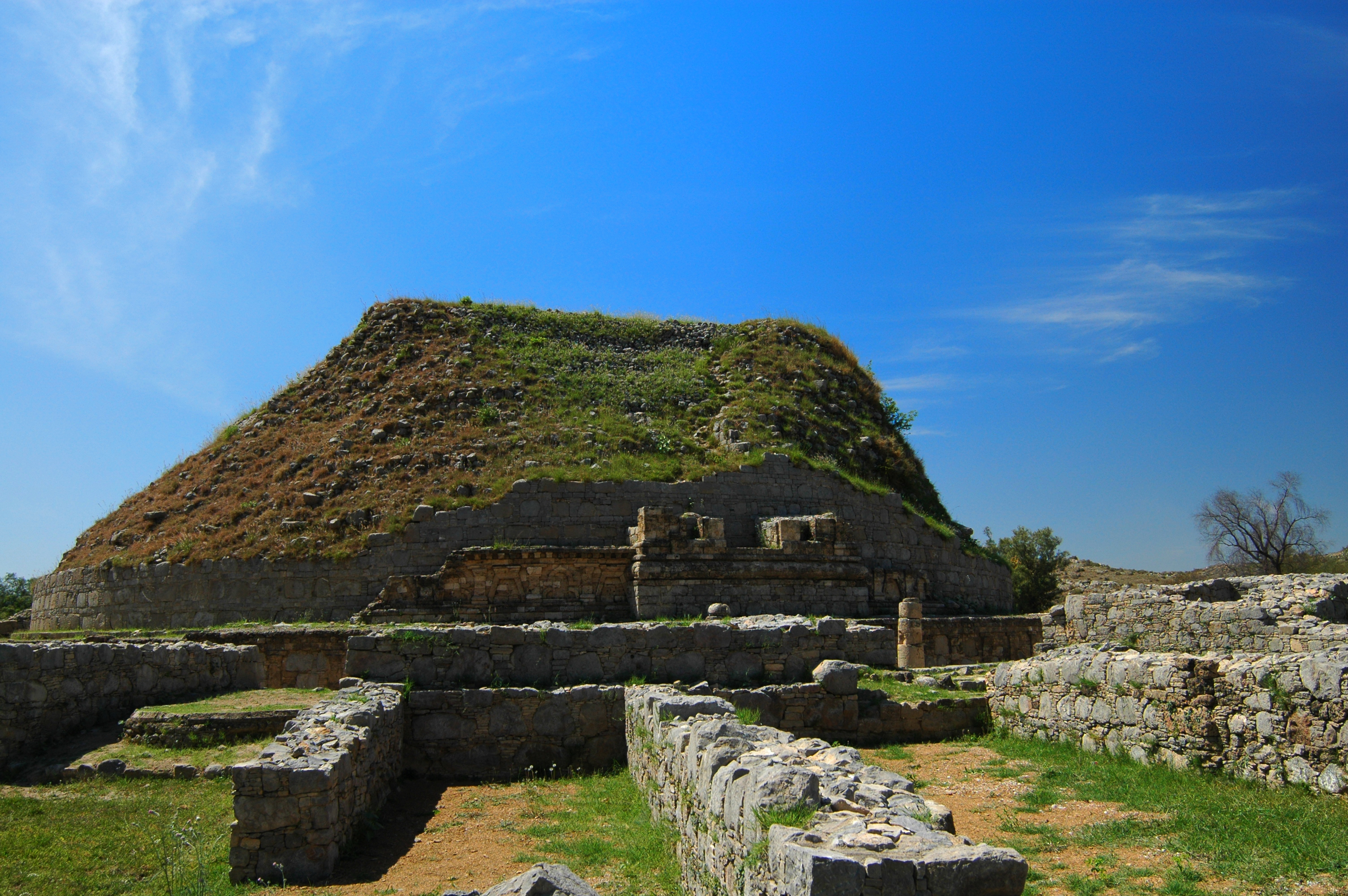

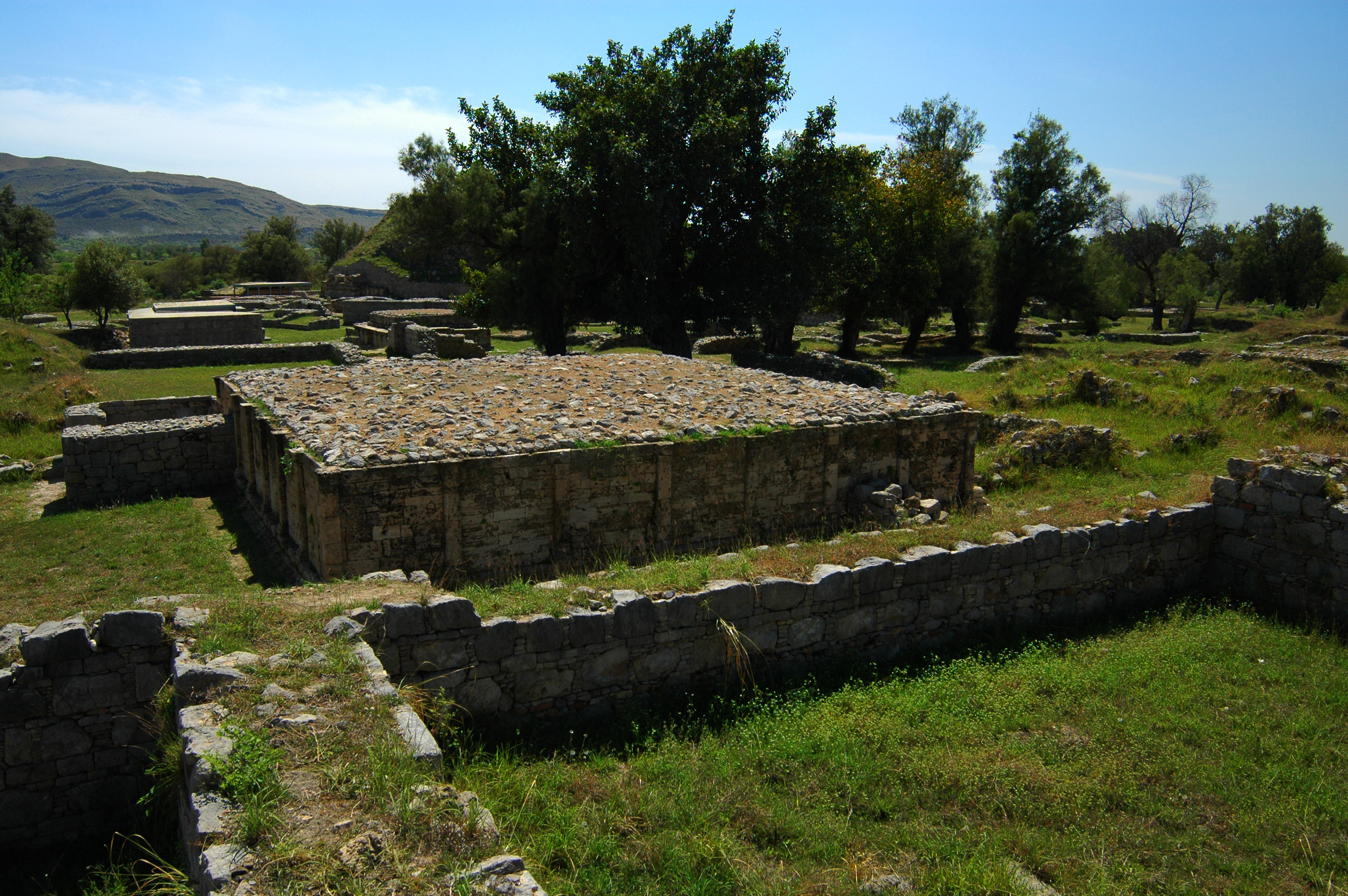

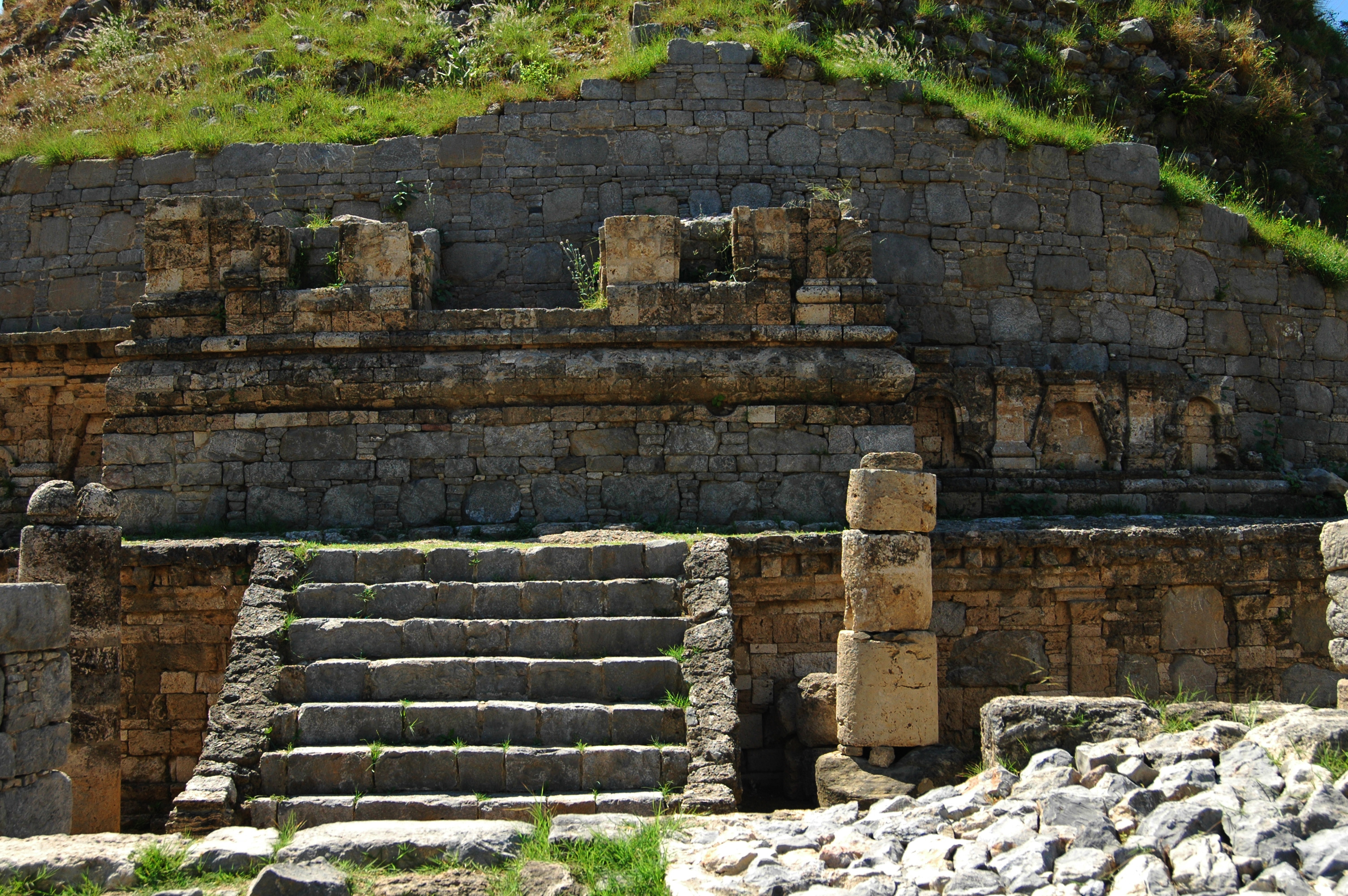

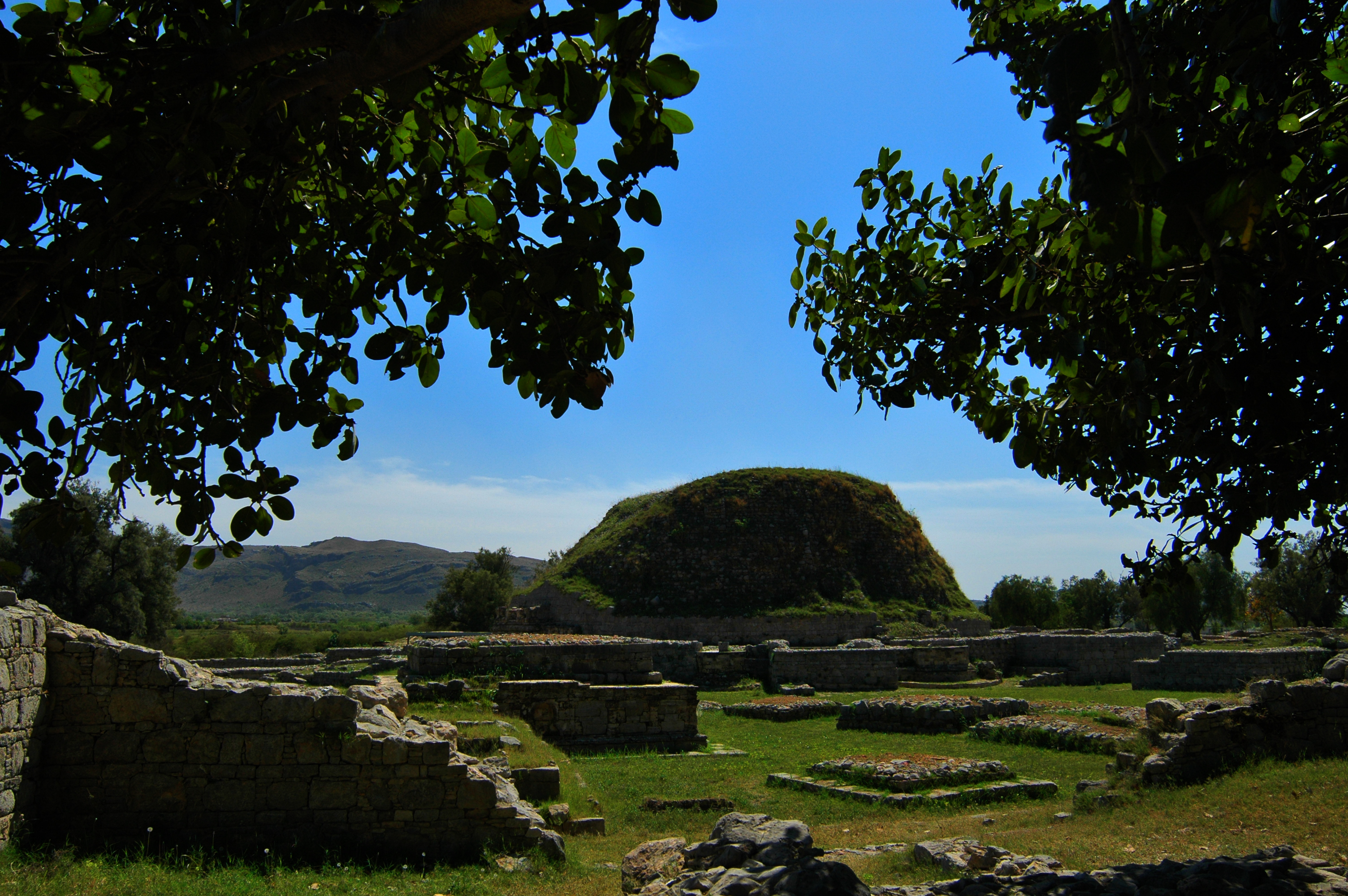

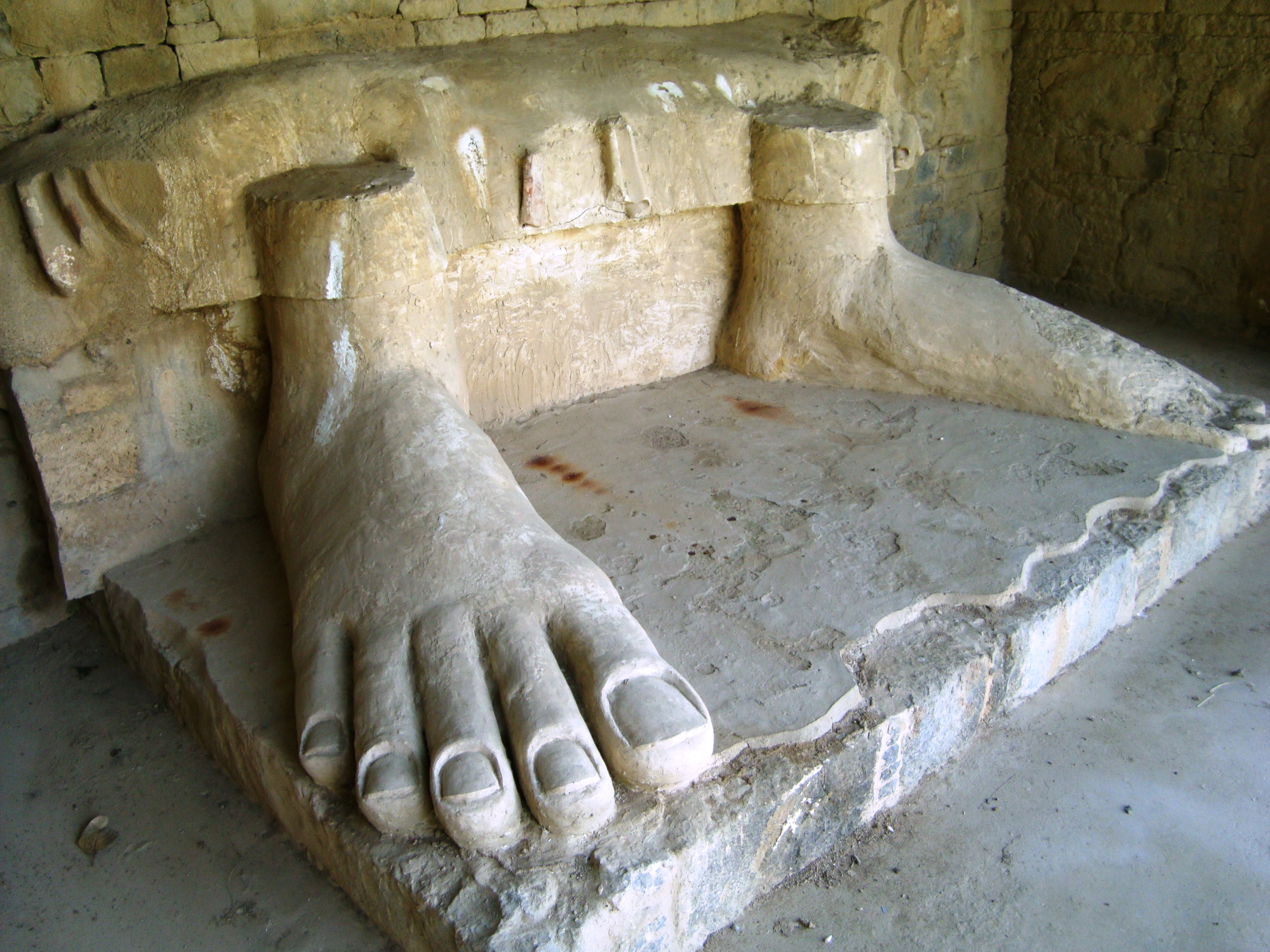

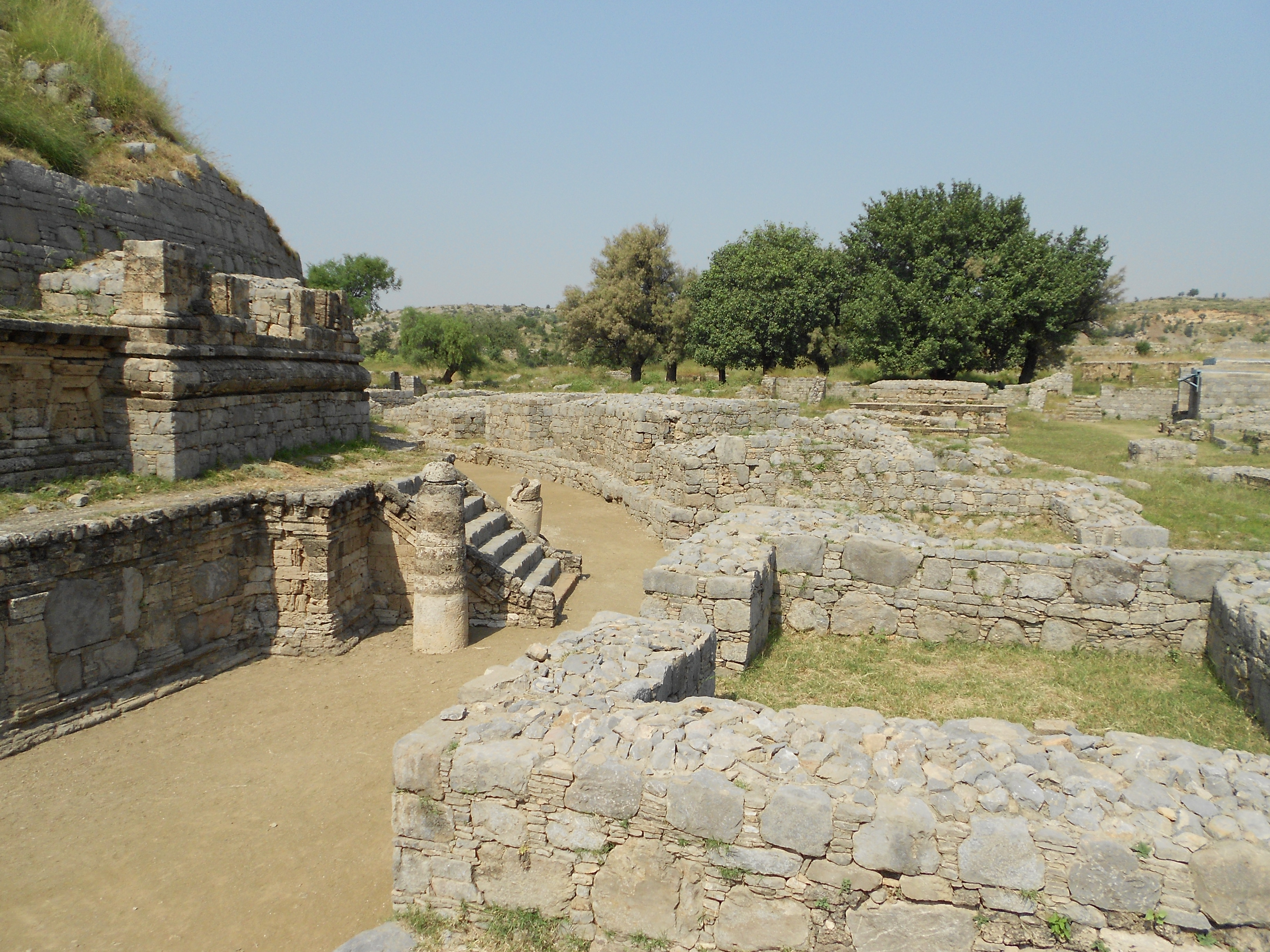

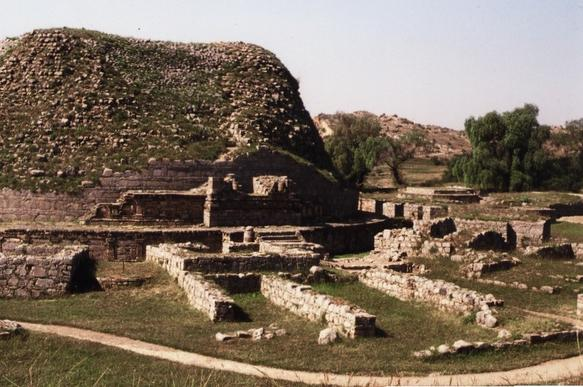

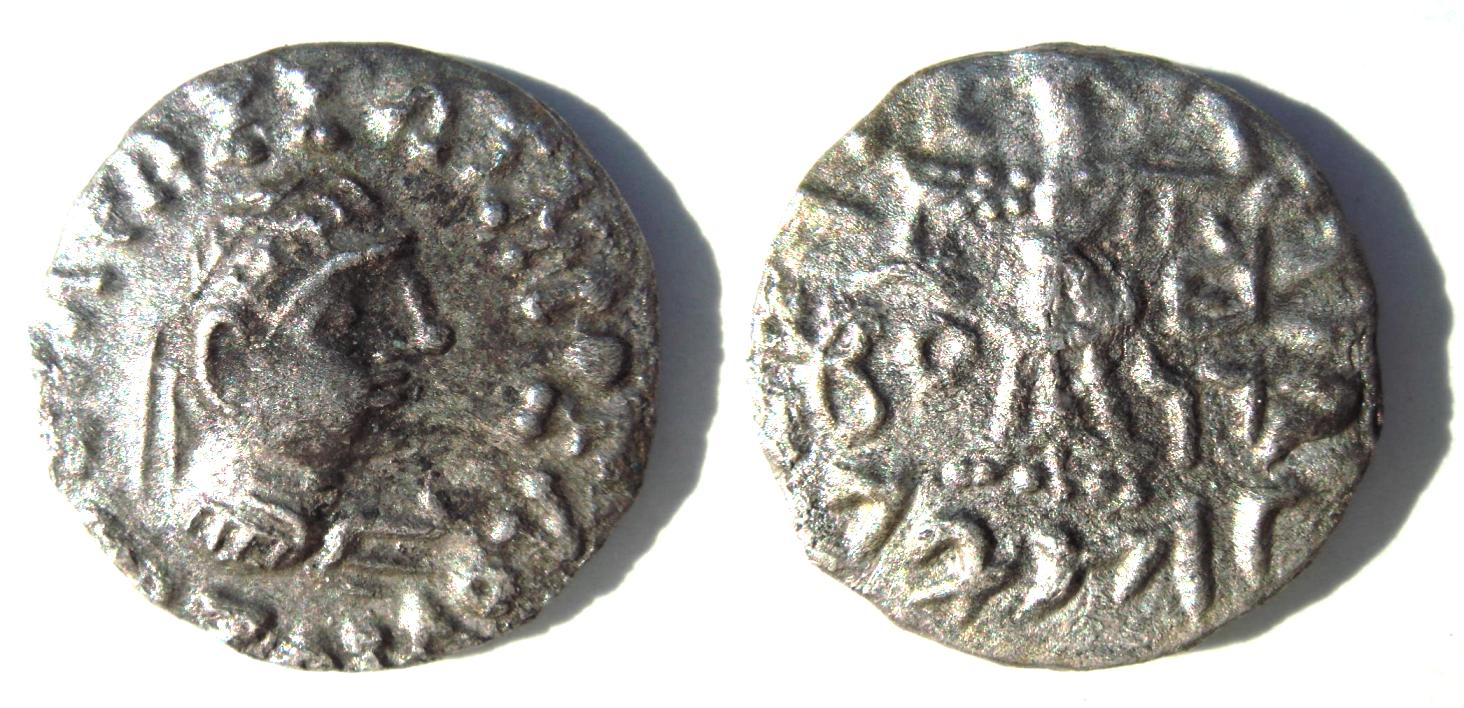
Coins of the Indo-Greek ruler Zoilos II were found under a peripheral stupa.

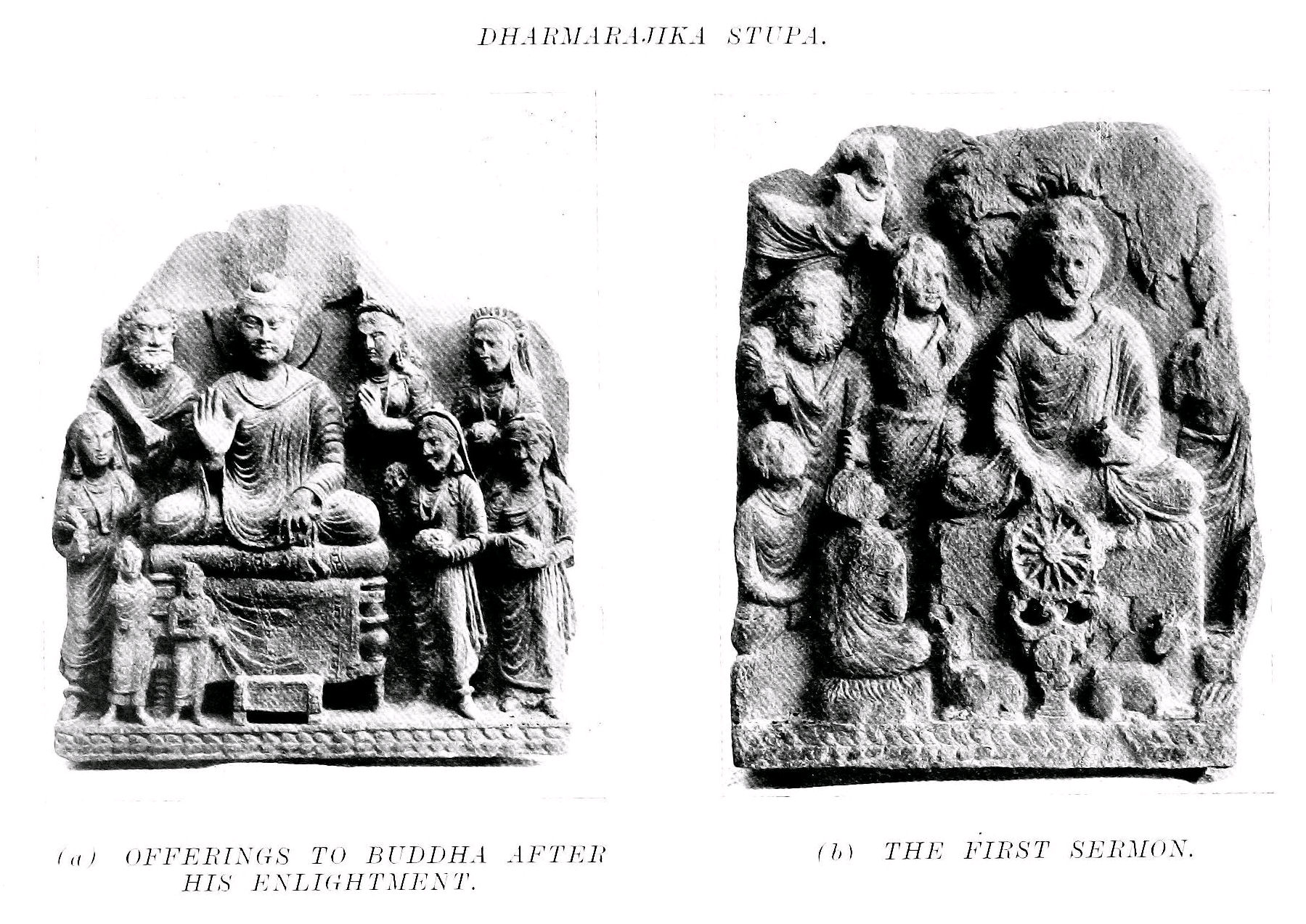
Sculptures from the Dharmarajika Stupa

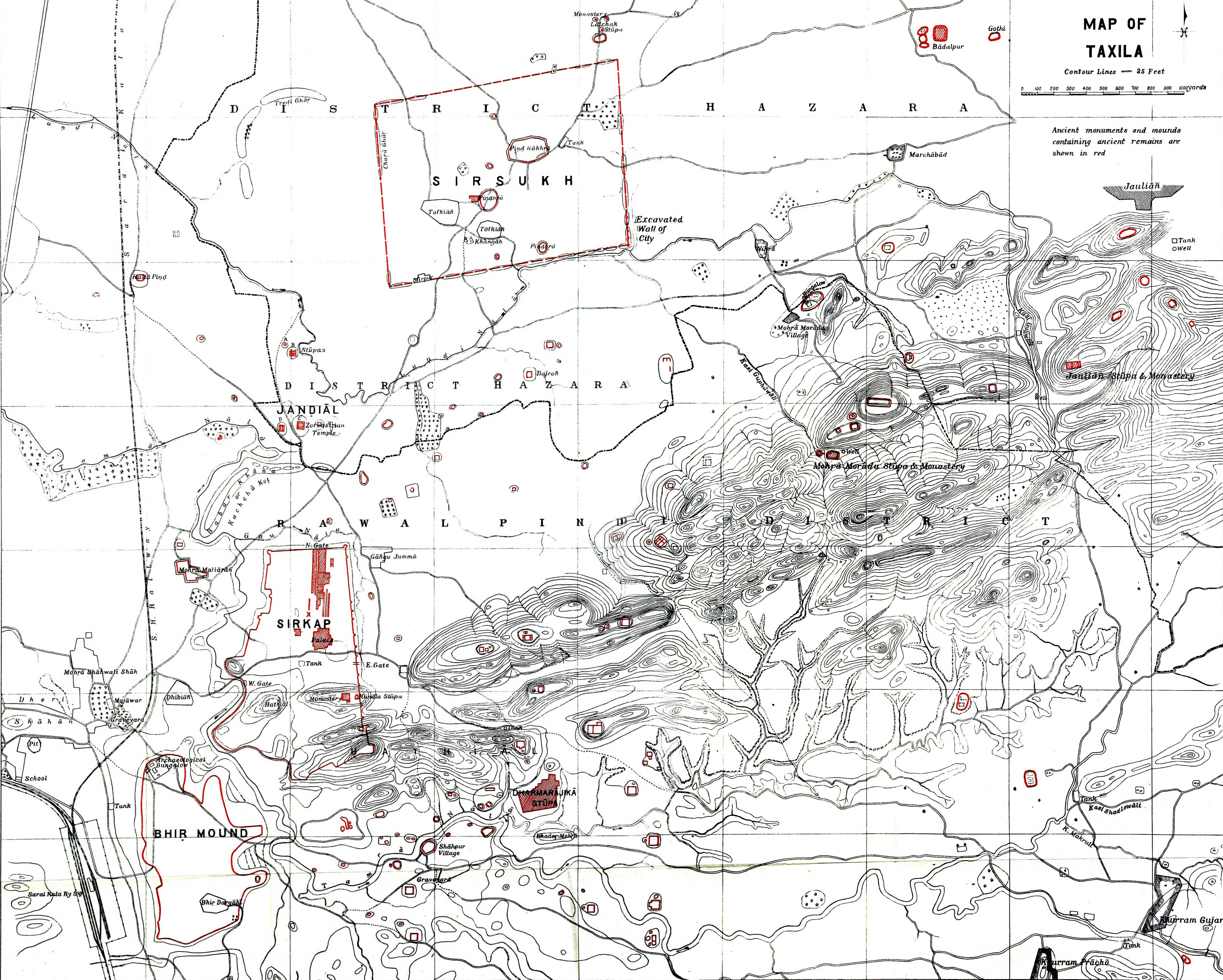
The Dharmarajika Stupa is located to the southeast of Sirkap.

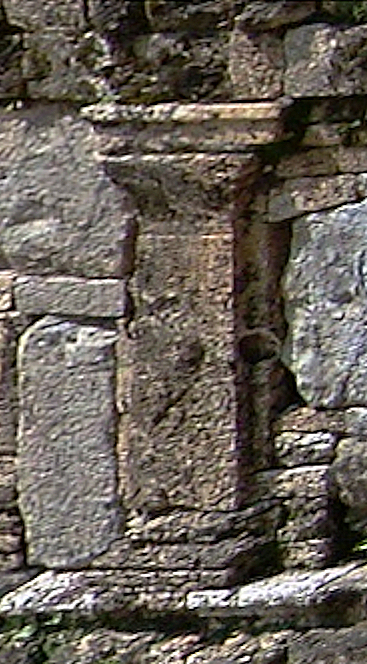
Indo-Corinthian pillars.

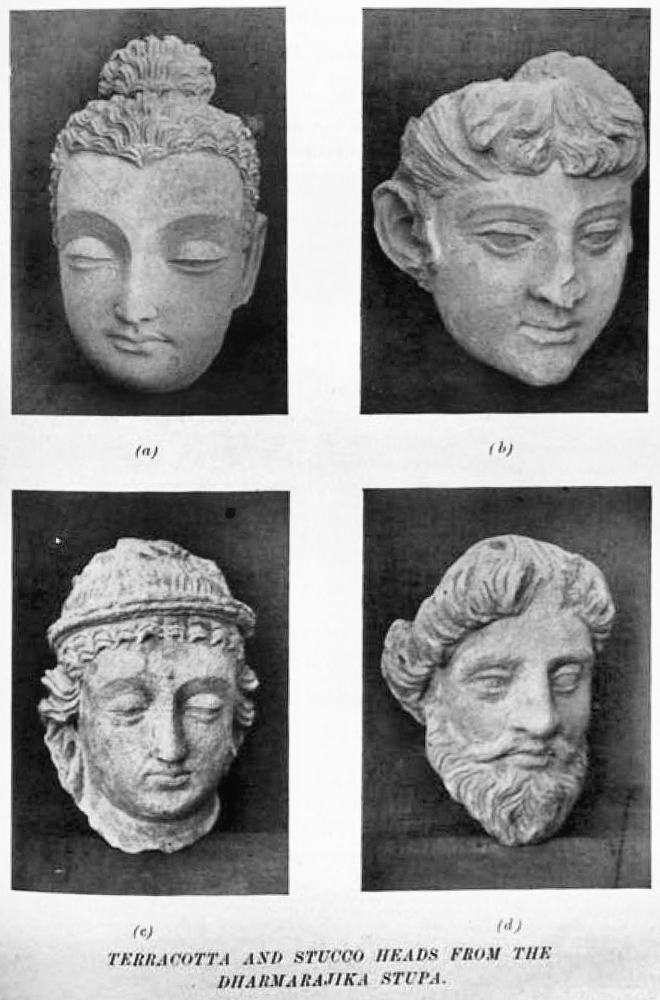
Stucco heads.

== See also ==
- Bhir Mound
- Jaulian
- Sirkap
- Sirsukh
- Mohra Muradu
- Taxila
- Mankiala stupa -commemorates the spot, where according to the Jataka tales, an incarnation of the Buddha sacrificed himself to feed seven hungry tiger cubs
