= Soteria =

Soteria may refer to:

- Soteria (festival), a festival in Ancient Greece
- Soteria (mythology), Greek goddess or spirit of safety and deliverance from harm
- Soteria (psychiatric treatment), a method of psychiatric treatment
- Soteria Aliberty (1847–1929), Greek feminist and educator
- Soteria Belou (1921–1997), famous Greek singer and performer

== See also ==
- Soter
- Soteriology
