= Apollophanes =

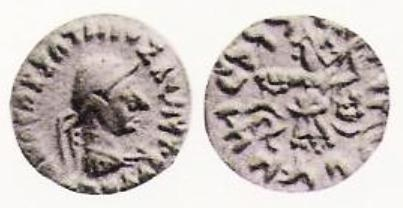
- Silver drachm of king Apollophanes (r. 35-25 BC). Obv: Helmeted bust of king. Greek legend: BASILEOS SOTEROS APOLLOPHANOU "Of Saviour King Apollophanes". Rev: Pallas with aegis and thunderbolt. Kharoshthi legend: MAHARAJASA TRATARASA APALAVINASA "Saviour king Apollophanes".

Indo-Greek king
- Reign: 35–25 BC
- Died: Mathura

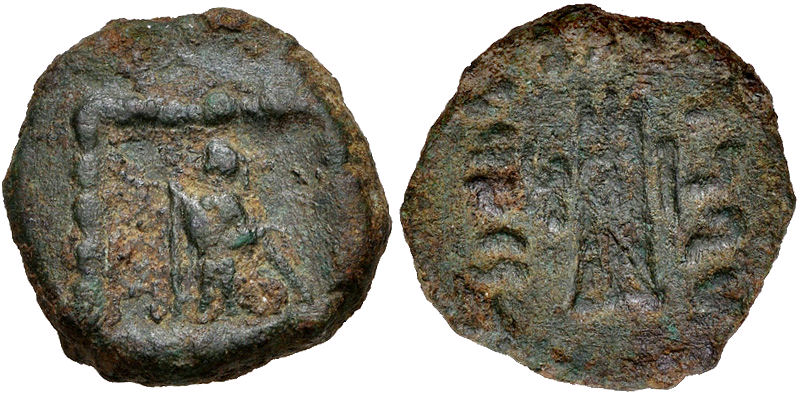
Coin of Apollophanes Soter, Khanroshthi legend: "Maharajasa tratarasa Aplaphanasa" (Saviour King Apollophanes).

Apollophanes Soter (Greek: Ἀπολλοφάνης ὁ Σωτήρ; epithet means "the Saviour"; reigned c. 35 – 25 BC) was an Indo-Greek king in the area of eastern and central Punjab in modern India and Pakistan.

== Rule ==
Little is known about him, except for some of his remaining coins. The dating is Osmund Bopearachchi's, but R. C. Senior suggests approximately the same dates. Earlier scholars, such as Professor Ahmed Hasan Dani, W.W. Tarn and A.K. Narain dated Apollophanes considerably earlier, but the style and finding places of his coins make it clear that he belonged to the last line of eastern Indo-Greek kings, not long before they were overcome completely by pressure from the Indo-Scythians.

He may have been a relative of Apollodotus II Soter since both kings share the epithet Soter (Saviour), have names related to Apollo and use Pallas Athene as their reverse.

== Coins of Apollophanes ==
The boxy mint mark characteristic of Apollophanes and later Indo-Greek kings.

Apollophanes issued a few debased silver drachms of the type seen above, struck with a single monogram and of little artistic quality. He seems to have been an insignificant local ruler. Apollophanes wears what appears to be a Macedonian helmet of the type seen on the Alexander Mosaic which he was the last Indo-Greek ruler to use.

Apollophanes used exclusively a single "boxy" mint-mark, in keeping with late Indo-Greek kings.

== See also ==
- Greco-Bactrian Kingdom
- Seleucid Empire
- Greco-Buddhism
- Indo-Scythians
- Indo-Parthian Kingdom
- Kushan Empire

	Greco-Bactrian kings		Indo-Greek kings					
Territories/ dates	West Bactria	East Bactria	Paropamisade	Arachosia	Gandhara	Western Punjab	Eastern Punjab	Mathura
326-325 BCE	Campaigns of Alexander the Great in India						Nanda Empire	
312 BCE	Creation of the Seleucid Empire						Creation of the Maurya Empire	
305 BCE	Seleucid Empire after Mauryan war		Maurya Empire					
280 BCE	Foundation of Ai-Khanoum							
255–239 BCE	Independence of the Greco-Bactrian kingdom Diodotus I		Emperor Ashoka (268-232 BCE)					
239–223 BCE	Diodotus II							
230–200 BCE	Euthydemus I							
200–190 BCE	Demetrius I				Sunga Empire			
190-185 BCE	Euthydemus II							
190–180 BCE	Agathocles			Pantaleon				
185–170 BCE	Antimachus I							
180–160 BCE			Apollodotus I					
175–170 BCE	Demetrius II							
160–155 BCE			Antimachus II					
170–145 BCE	Eucratides I							
155–130 BCE	Yuezhi occupation, loss of Ai-Khanoum	Eucratides II; Plato; Heliocles I	Menander I					
130–120 BCE	Yuezhi occupation		Zoilus I		Agathoclea			Yavanarajya inscription
120–110 BCE			Lysias		Strato I			Yavanarajya inscription
110–100 BCE			Antialcidas		Heliocles II			Yavanarajya inscription
100 BCE			Polyxenus		Demetrius III			Yavanarajya inscription
100–95 BCE			Philoxenus					Yavanarajya inscription
95–90 BCE			Diomedes	Amyntas		Epander		Yavanarajya inscription
90 BCE			Theophilus	Peucolaus		Thraso		Yavanarajya inscription
90–85 BCE			Nicias	Menander II		Artemidorus		Yavanarajya inscription
90–70 BCE			Hermaeus	Archebius				Yavanarajya inscription
			Yuezhi occupation		Maues (Indo-Scythian)			
75–70 BCE				Vonones	Telephus	Apollodotus II		
65–55 BCE				Spalirises		Hippostratus	Dionysius	
55–35 BCE					Azes I (Indo-Scythians)		Zoilus II	
55–35 BCE					Vijayamitra/ Azilises		Apollophanes	
25 BCE – 10 CE				Gondophares	Zeionises	Kharahostes	Strato II; Strato III	
				Gondophares (Indo-Parthian)			Rajuvula (Indo-Scythian)	
			Kujula Kadphises (Kushan Empire)				Bhadayasa (Indo-Scythian)	Sodasa (Indo-Scythian)

Preceded by Zoilos II	Indo-Greek Ruler (in Eastern Punjab); 35 – 25 BC	Succeeded by Strato II and III
