= Strato II =

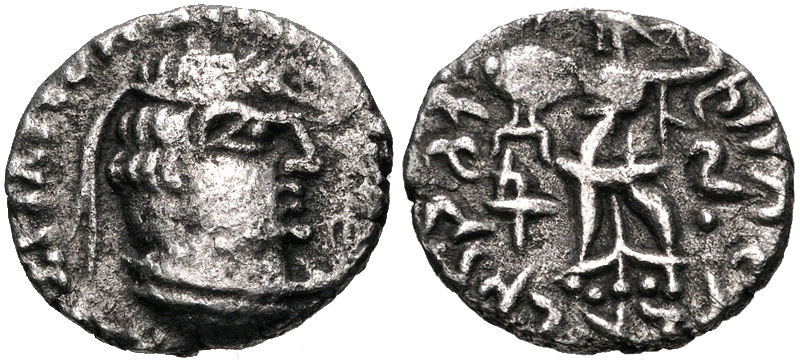
- Saka imitation of Strato II

Indo-Greek king
- Reign: 25 BCE – 10 CE
- Predecessor: Menander II (dynastically)
- Successor: Strato III
- Died: 10 CE; Mathura
- Religion: Greco-Buddhism

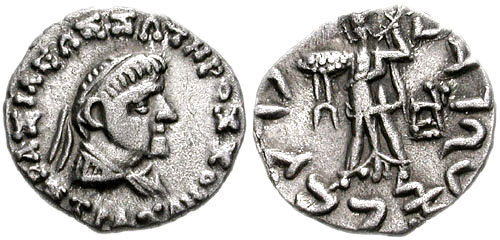
Coin of Strato II. Obv: Bust of Strato II. Greek legend: BASILEOS SOTEROS STRATONOS "Of King Strato the Savior". Rev: Athena holding a thunderbolt. Kharoshthi legend: MAHARAJASA TRATARASA STRATASA "King Strato the Saviour".

Strato II Soter (Ancient Greek: Στράτων B΄ ὁ Σωτήρ, Strátōn B΄ ho Sotḗr; epithet means "the Saviour") also known as Stratha, was an Indo-Greek king. He ruled c. 25 BCE to 10 CE according to Bopearachchi. R. C. Senior suggests that his reign ended perhaps a decade earlier. He may have been supplanted by the Indo-Scythian Northern Satraps, particularly Rajuvula and Bhadayasa, whose coins were often copied on those of the last Indo-Greek kings. Numerous coins of Rajuvula have been found in company with the coins of the Strato group in the Eastern Punjab (to the east of the Jhelum) and also in the Mathura area: for example, 96 coins of Strato II were found in Mathura in conjunction with coins of Rajuvula, who also imitated the designs of Strato II in the majority of his issues.

== Rule ==
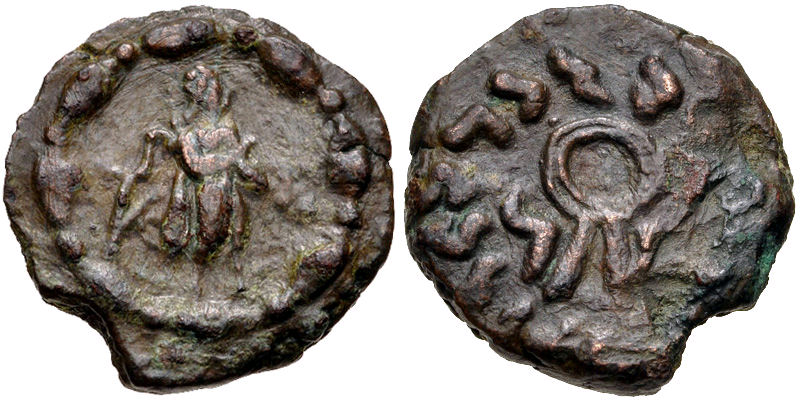
Monolingual coin of Strato II Soter in Prakrit only. Obv. Apollo standing right, with quiver on back, holding arrow; thick bead-and-reel border. Obv. Diadem with Kharoshthi legend "Maharajasa tratarasa Stratasa" (Saviour King Strato).

Strato II ruled in the eastern Punjab, probably retaining the capital of Sagala (modern Sialkot, Pakistan), or possibly to the city of Bucephala (Plutarch, p. 48 n. 5).

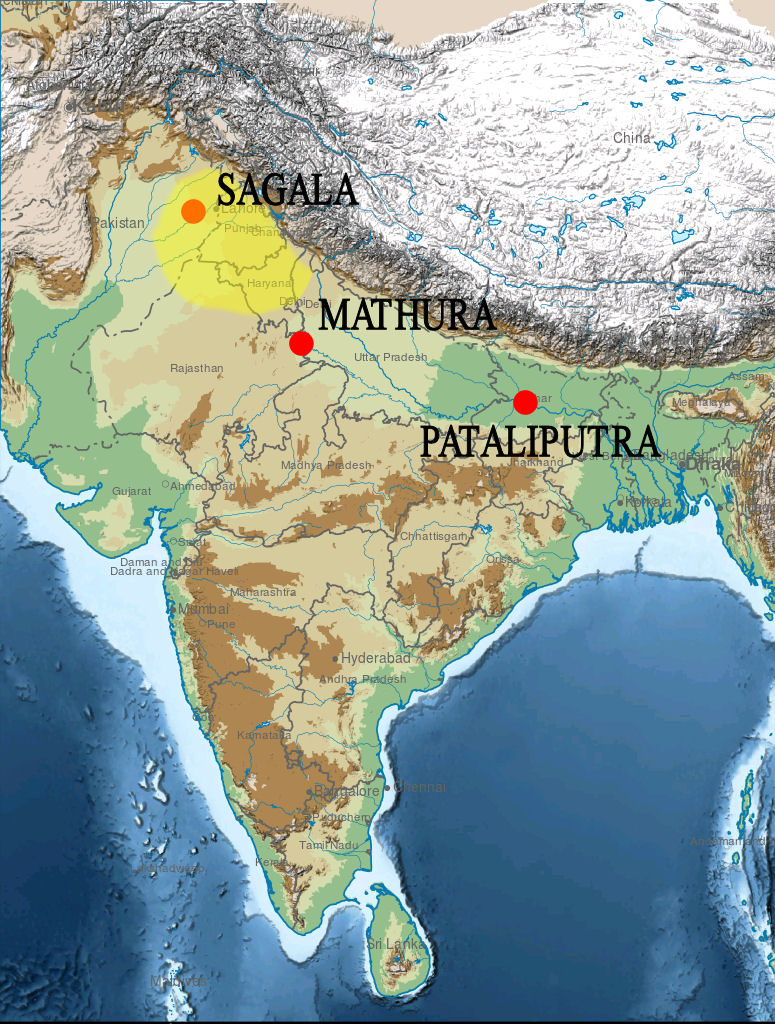
Approximate region of East Punjab and Strato II's capital Sagala.

His territory was invaded by Rajuvula, Indo-Scythian king of Mathura, and he became the last of the Indo-Greek kings, together with his son Strato III "Philopator" ("the father-loving"), who was included as joint regent on some of his coins and also issued coins on his own.

A few silver coins with a different portrait and the inscription Strato Soter Dikaios ("the just") may also belong to Strato III as sole ruler, or to a fourth king named Strato. (Note: Given that the coins of Strato I have lately been attributed to two different kings, there may actually have been as many as five kings named Strato.)

Just like the earlier king Strato I, the last Stratos are thought to belong to the dynasty of Menander I, who also used the epithet Soter and the symbol of standing Pallas Athena.

== Coins of Strato II, III and Strato Dikaios ==
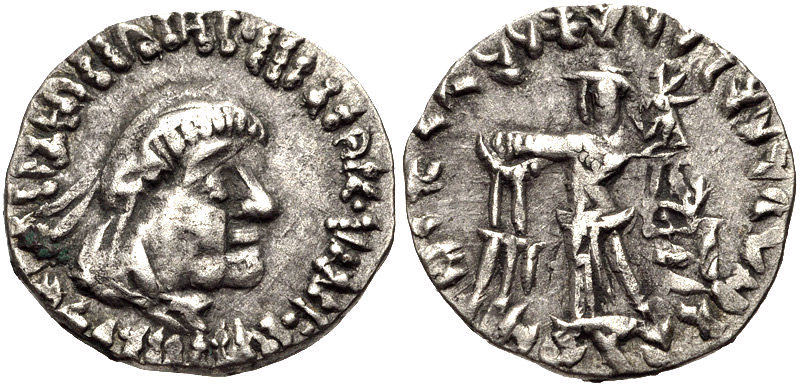
Coin of Strato II and Strato III. Obv: Probable bust of Strato II. Possible Greek legend: ΒΑϹΙΛΕΩΣ ϹΩΤΙΡΟϹ ϹΤΡΑΤΩΝΟϹ ΚΑΙ ΦΙΑ / ϹΤΡΑΤΩΝΟϹ "Of Kings Strato the Saviour and Strato the Father-loving". Rev: Athena holding a thunderbolt. Kharoshthi legend: MAHARAJASA TRATARASA STRATASA, POTRASA CASA PRIYAPITA STRATASA "King Strato the Saviour, and his grandson Strato the Father-loving.

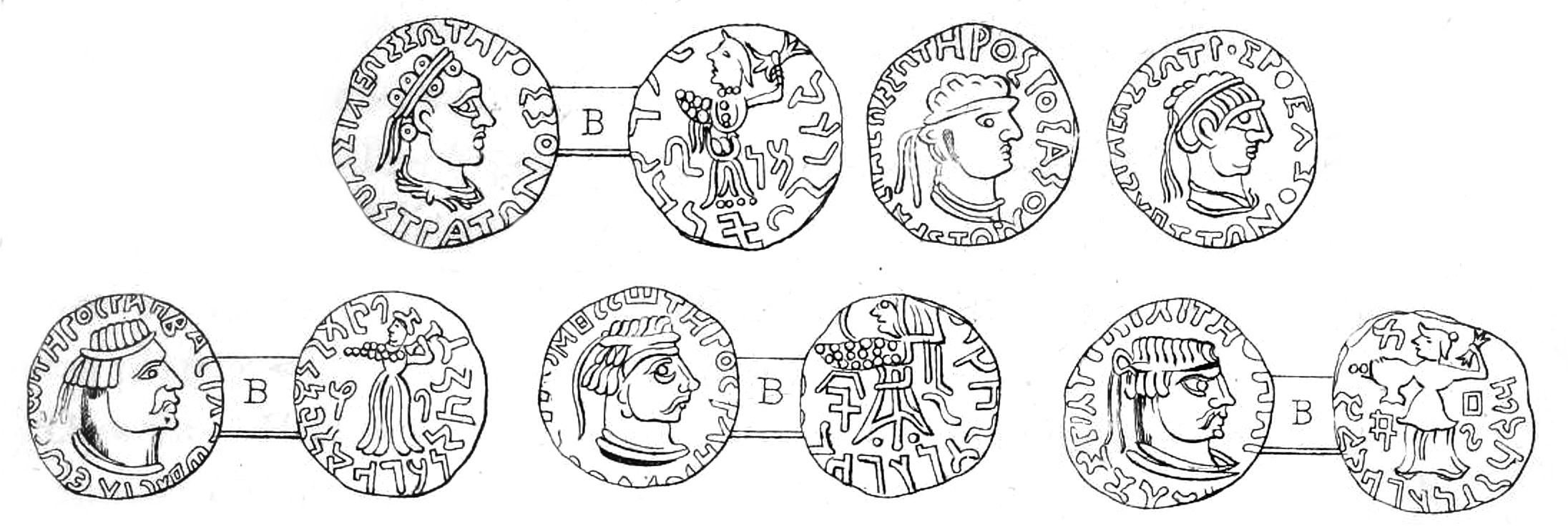
Coins of Strato II (top) and Rajuvula (bottom) discovered together in a mound in Mathura.

The chronology of the late Indo-Greek kingdom has been established by Bopearachchi and other scholars from numismatical evidence alone. The coins deteriorated continuously, the Strato coins being the most debased and crude in style, a striking contrast to earlier kings who struck some of the most beautiful coins of antiquity.

The decay was due to the increasing pressure of the Indo-Scythian nomads on the remaining Greek pockets, as well as their long isolation from the rest of the Hellenistic world.

The boxy mint mark characteristic of Strato II and III and late Indo-Greek kings.

Strato II and III used exclusively a single "boxy" mint-mark, which they had in common with late Indo-Greek kings such as Apollophanes and was initiated by Dionysios Soter.

Strato II, Strato III and Strato Dikaios struck debased silver drachms, which as mentioned portray Pallas on the reverse. Strato II appears as an old man with a sunken jaw on some of his coins, which is not surprising given that his grandson was co-regent.

Strato II also issued bronzes and even lead coins of the common type Apollo/tripod. On some of Strato II's silver drachms the letter sigma is written as C (a lunate sigma), a not uncommon trait on late Hellenistic coins in the east.

== Imitations by Indo-Scythian rulers ==
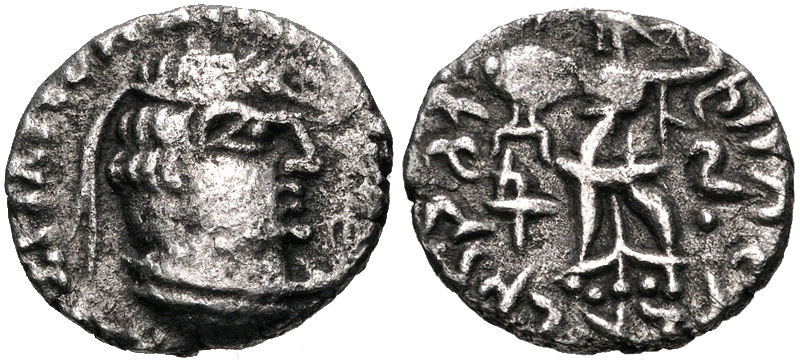
Coin of Northern Satrap Rajuvula (c. 10 CE), an imitation of Strato II, Mathura and Eastern Punjab. This was the main coin type of Rajuvula.

Subsequent Indo-Scythian rulers, who replaced the Stratos in their territories, designed their coins in direct imitation of those of Strato II. This is the case of the Northern Satraps, who ruled in the territories from Sagala in Eastern Punjab to Mathura, such as Rajuvula, Bhadayasa. Just as the Yuezhi had copied the coins of the last Greco-Bactrian ruler Heliocles in Bactria, or the Indo-Scythians had copied the coins of the last western Indo-Greek ruler Hermaios in the area of Kabul, here again the Indo-Scythian Northern Satraps relied heavily on the numismatics of their predecessors.

	Greco-Bactrian kings		Indo-Greek kings					
Territories/ dates	West Bactria	East Bactria	Paropamisade	Arachosia	Gandhara	Western Punjab	Eastern Punjab	Mathura
326-325 BCE	Campaigns of Alexander the Great in India						Nanda Empire	
312 BCE	Creation of the Seleucid Empire						Creation of the Maurya Empire	
305 BCE	Seleucid Empire after Mauryan war		Maurya Empire					
280 BCE	Foundation of Ai-Khanoum							
255–239 BCE	Independence of the Greco-Bactrian kingdom Diodotus I		Emperor Ashoka (268-232 BCE)					
239–223 BCE	Diodotus II							
230–200 BCE	Euthydemus I							
200–190 BCE	Demetrius I				Sunga Empire			
190-185 BCE	Euthydemus II							
190–180 BCE	Agathocles			Pantaleon				
185–170 BCE	Antimachus I							
180–160 BCE			Apollodotus I					
175–170 BCE	Demetrius II							
160–155 BCE			Antimachus II					
170–145 BCE	Eucratides I							
155–130 BCE	Yuezhi occupation, loss of Ai-Khanoum	Eucratides II; Plato; Heliocles I	Menander I					
130–120 BCE	Yuezhi occupation		Zoilus I		Agathoclea			Yavanarajya inscription
120–110 BCE			Lysias		Strato I			Yavanarajya inscription
110–100 BCE			Antialcidas		Heliocles II			Yavanarajya inscription
100 BCE			Polyxenus		Demetrius III			Yavanarajya inscription
100–95 BCE			Philoxenus					Yavanarajya inscription
95–90 BCE			Diomedes	Amyntas		Epander		Yavanarajya inscription
90 BCE			Theophilus	Peucolaus		Thraso		Yavanarajya inscription
90–85 BCE			Nicias	Menander II		Artemidorus		Yavanarajya inscription
90–70 BCE			Hermaeus	Archebius				Yavanarajya inscription
			Yuezhi occupation		Maues (Indo-Scythian)			
75–70 BCE				Vonones	Telephus	Apollodotus II		
65–55 BCE				Spalirises		Hippostratus	Dionysius	
55–35 BCE					Azes I (Indo-Scythians)		Zoilus II	
55–35 BCE					Vijayamitra/ Azilises		Apollophanes	
25 BCE – 10 CE				Gondophares	Zeionises	Kharahostes	Strato II; Strato III	
				Gondophares (Indo-Parthian)			Rajuvula (Indo-Scythian)	
			Kujula Kadphises (Kushan Empire)				Bhadayasa (Indo-Scythian)	Sodasa (Indo-Scythian)

== See also ==
- Indo-Greek Kingdom
- Greco-Buddhism
- Indo-Scythians

== Notes and references ==
Notes

== Bibliography ==
- Whitehead, R.B. (1914). Catalogue of coins in the Punjab museum, Lahore. Vol. I Indo-Greek Coins. Oxford. At the Internet Archive.

Preceded by Apollophanes	Indo-Greek ruler (Eastern Punjab); 25 BCE – 10 CE	Succeeded by Strato III
