= Nasten =

Afghan king

Nasten was a king, who ruled perhaps in the region of Afghanistan at the beginning of the Christian era. So far, he is only known from a single coin found in a coin hoard in Afghanistan. On this coin he is called in a Greek inscription Nasten, son of Xatran. The names seems to be Iranian. It has been suggested that he was a local, Parthian vassal king in this region.

== Literature ==
- Osmund Bopearachchi: Nasten, a Hitherto Unknown Iranian Ruler in India, In: Studies In Silk Road Coins and Culture, The Institute of Silk Road Studies, Kamakura 1997
