= Greco-Buddhist art =

Artistic syncretism between Classical Greece and Buddhist India

Gandhara art
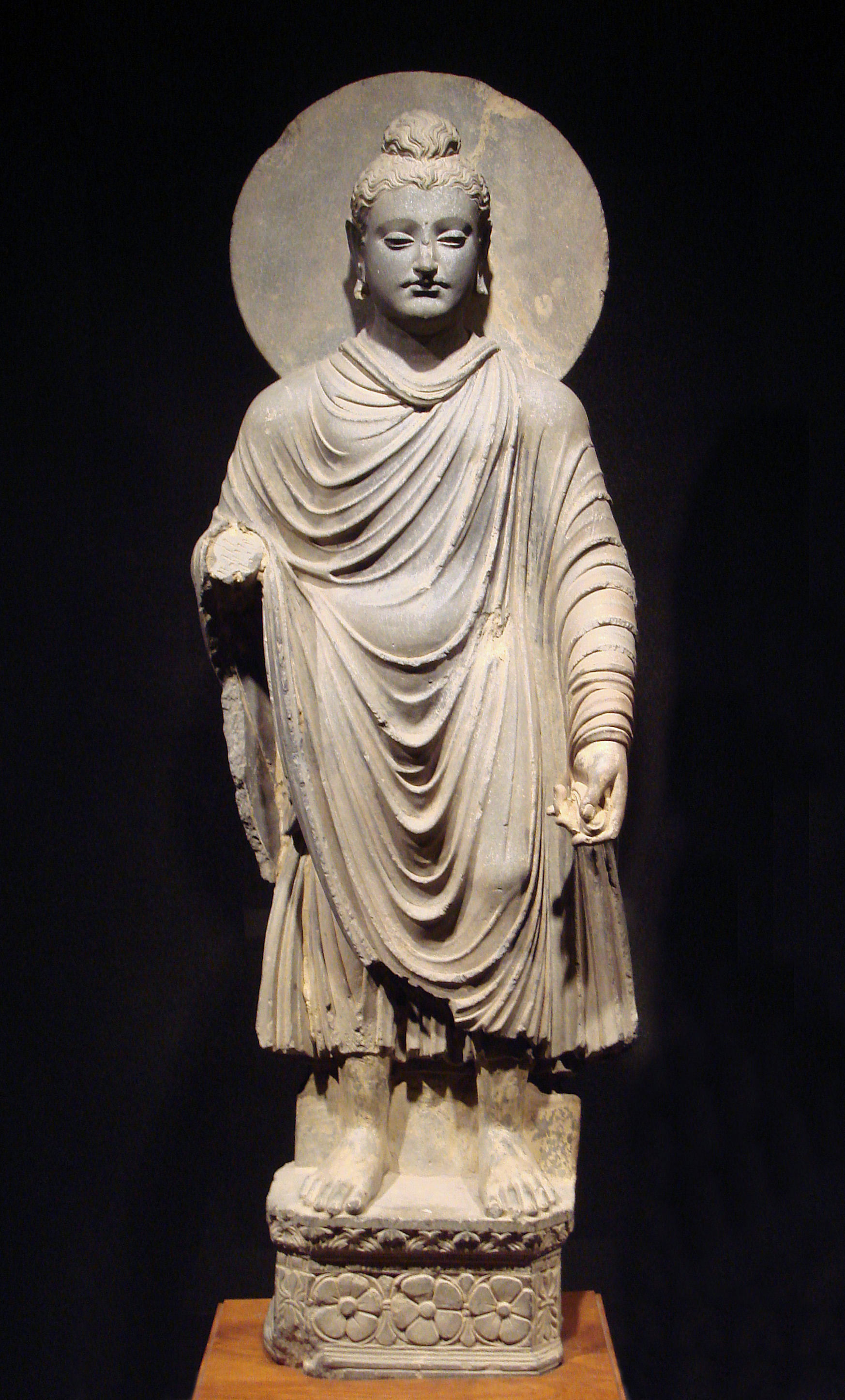
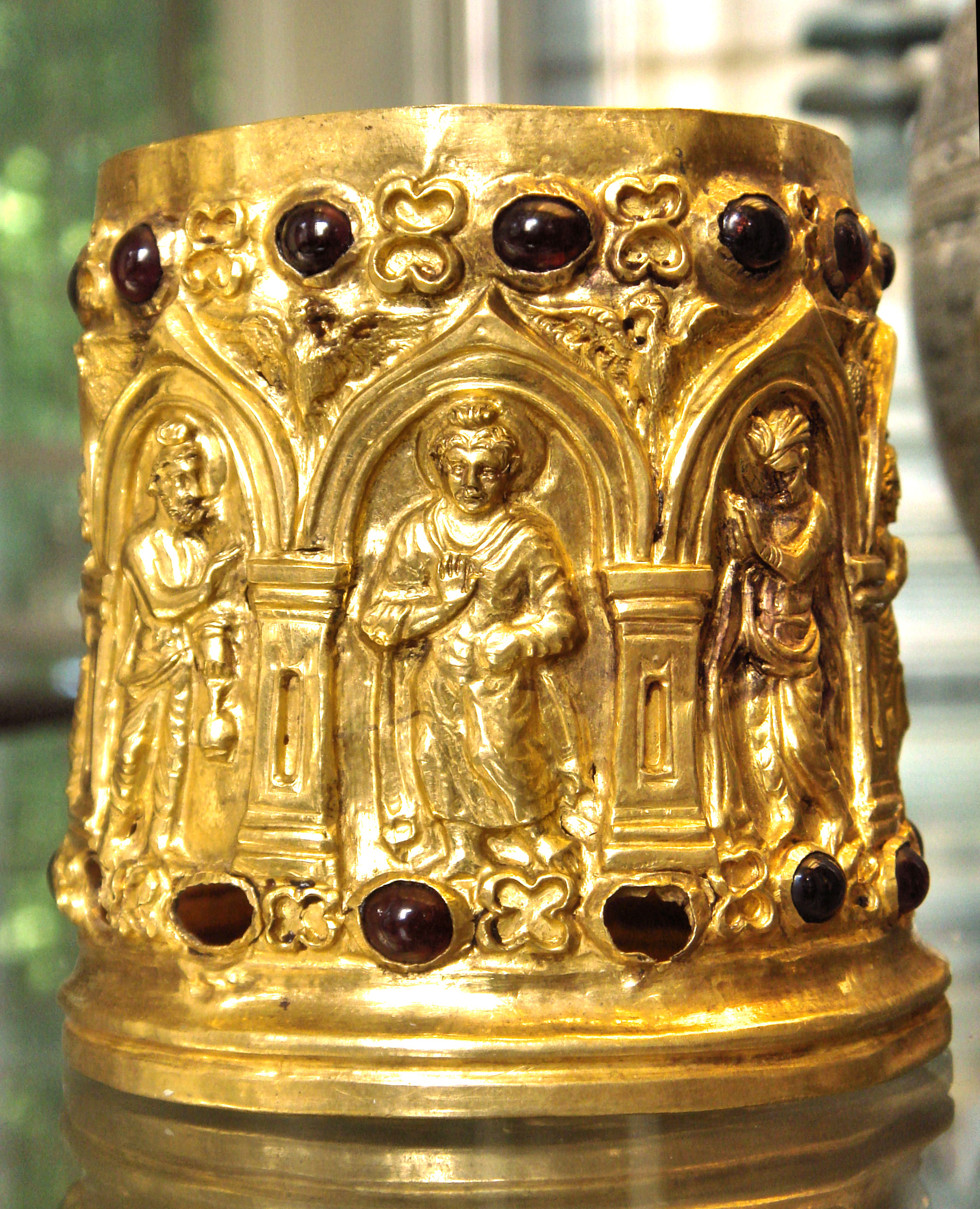
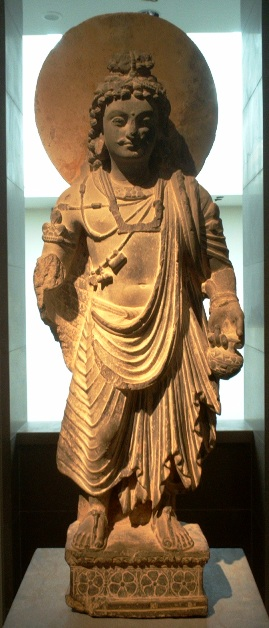
- Top: Standing Buddha from Gandhara, 1st-2nd century AD Centre: The Bimaran casket, representing the Buddha, is dated to around 30–10 BC. British Museum; Bottom: The Bodhisattva Maitreya, 2nd century AD, Gandhara
- Years active: 1st century BC -5th century AD
- Location: Central Asia; South Asia

The Greco-Buddhist art or Gandhara art is the artistic manifestation of Greco-Buddhism, a cultural syncretism between Ancient Greek art and Buddhism. It had mainly evolved in the ancient region of Gandhara, located in the northwestern fringe of the Indian subcontinent.

The series of interactions leading to Gandhara art occurred over time, beginning with Alexander the Great's brief incursion into the area, followed by the Mauryan Emperor Ashoka converting the region to Buddhism. Buddhism became the prominent religion in the Indo-Greek Kingdoms. However, Greco-Buddhist art truly flowered and spread under the Kushan Empire, when the first surviving devotional images of the Buddha were created during the 1st-3rd centuries AD. Gandhara art reached its zenith from the 3rd-5th century AD, when most surviving motifs and artworks were produced.

Gandhara art is characterized by Buddhist subject matter, sometimes adapting Greco-Roman elements, rendered in a style and forms that are heavily influenced by Greco-Roman art. It has the strong idealistic realism and sensuous description of Hellenistic art, and it is believed to have produced the first representations of Gautama Buddha in human form, ending the early period of aniconism in Buddhism.

The representation of the human form in large sculpture had a considerable influence, both to the south in the rest of India, and to the east, where the spread of Buddhism carried its influence as far as Japan.

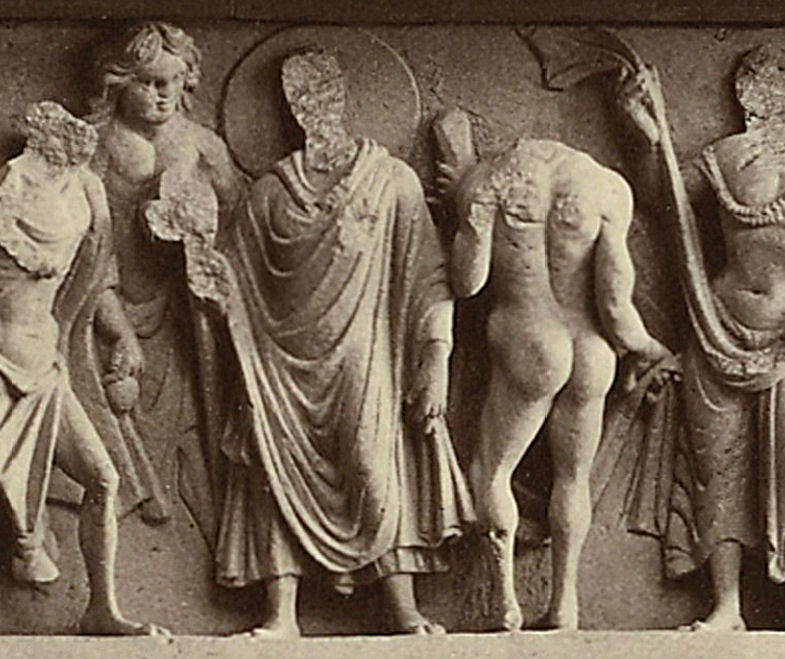
The Buddha and a naked Vajrapani in a frieze at Jamal Garhi, Gandhara.

== Historical outline ==
Buddhist expansion in Asia: Mahayana Buddhism first entered the Chinese Empire (Han dynasty) through Silk Road during the Kushan Era. The overland and maritime "Silk Roads" were interlinked and complementary, forming what scholars have called the "great circle of Buddhism".

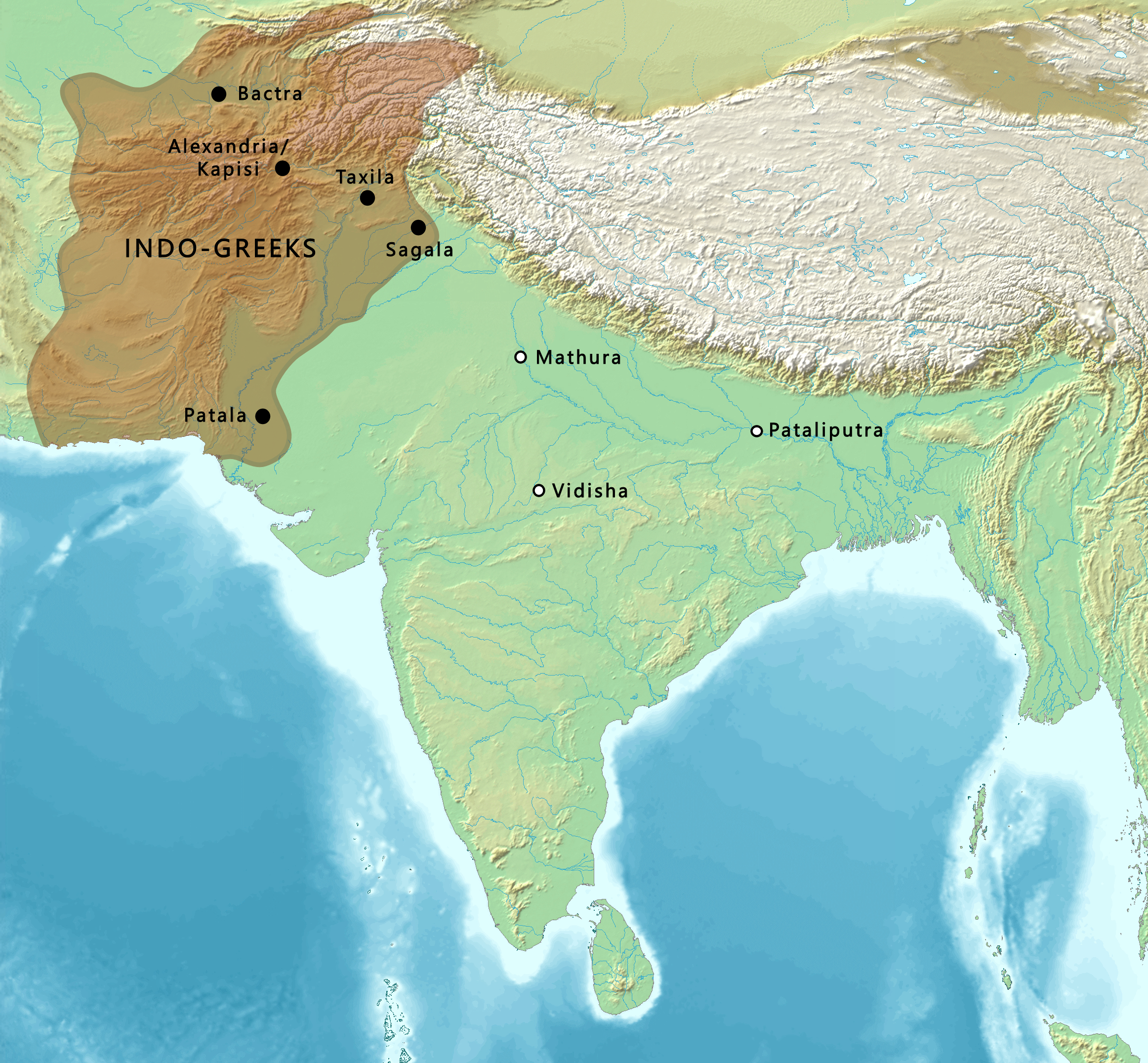
The Indo-Greek Kingdoms in 100–150 BC.

There has been disagreement among art historians as to whether Gandharan art owes more to the culture established immediately after Alexander's campaigns, or to a synthesis several centuries later between travelling Greco-Roman artists from the eastern Roman Empire in regions where Greek settlers were still important. Most of the considerable quantity of Gandharan art that can be dated comes from after about 50 AD, although some clearly was created earlier. For this reason, some scholars prefer to call this Romano-Indian art, or talk of an "Indo-Classical style".

The French scholar Alfred C. A. Foucher first identified the Western influences on Gandharan art at the end of the 19th century. He was initially a proponent of the continuity between the first Greek settlements and this art, and dated much of the art much earlier than more recent scholars do. However, he later revised his views and datings somewhat. His views as to dates and the crucial period of Western influence came to be widely rejected, but then received considerable support by the discovery of the important deserted city site of Ai-Khanoum (Alexandria on the Oxus), which was excavated in the 1960s and 1970s, where quantities of clearly Greek-influenced art were found, datable to the 3rd and (mostly) 2nd centuries BC.

Greco-Buddhist art originated after a series of cultural exchanges between populations. During the time of Alexander the Great's military campaign in the Indian subcontinent and South Asia, Buddhism was mostly limited to North Eastern India and not common in North Western India, where the Greek satrapies formed. Buddhism became widespread throughout South and Central Asia under the Maurya Empire. The Mauryan Emperor Ashoka converted his Greek subjects among others to Buddhism as mentioned in his Edicts of Ashoka.

Here in the king's domain among the Yavanas (Greeks), the Kambojas, the Nabhakas, the Nabhapamkits, the Bhojas, the Pitinikas, the Andhras and the Palidas, everywhere people are following Beloved-of-the-Gods' instructions in Dharma.

— Ashoka, Rock Edict 13

After the overthrow of the Maurya Empire by the Shunga Empire, which did not extend to the north-western corners of the Mauryan territories, many of the Greek satrapies continued to practice Buddhism and developed the Greco-Buddhist art. This was evident during the reign of the Hellenistic Greco-Bactrian kingdom (250–130 BC) and the Indo-Greek kingdom (180–10 BC). Under the Indo-Greeks and especially later under the Kushan Empire, Greco-Buddhist art flourished in the area of Gandhara and even spread to Central Asia, affecting the art of the Tarim Basin, as well as permeating again into India.

The Yavana (Greek) king Menander I was given the title of Soter ("Savior"), presumably for his aid of Buddhists that were being persecuted. According to the Milinda Panha, Menander was a devout Buddhist and achieved the title of an arhat, and was buried in a stupa according to the Buddhist fashion. Following the death of Menander, the Indo-Greek Kingdoms disintegrated and their realm was conquered by invading Indo-Scythians or other regional entities. The Indo-Scythians were in turn subjugated by the Kushan Empire as the Western Satraps and the Kushan Empire would consolidate power throughout most of Central Asia and North India. The Kushan Emperor Kanishka, was also a devout Buddhist and Buddhism and its art flourished during the Kushan Era. Furthermore, he was responsible for spreading Mahayana Buddhism and Buddhist art throughout the Silk Road.

== Early Buddhist art and aniconic Buddhist representations ==
Buddhist art first became evident and widespread under the Maurya Empire during the reign of Ashoka the Great. Mauryan art heavily influenced early Buddhist art and its iconography. This is evident in the art found throughout the Maurya Empire such as capitals including the Pillars of Ashoka, and stupas such as the Sanchi and Bharhut stupas, which were constructed and first decorated during the Maurya Era.

Early Buddhist art, including Mauryan art, depicted various structures and symbols pertaining to dharmic religions which are still used today. Symbols such as the Dharmachakra, lotus, and the Bodhi tree have become common iconography representing Buddhism.

Additionally, these Buddhist artforms included various mythological beings such as yakshas including Kubera and yakshini such as Chanda, as well as celestial Devas (Suras) and Asuras. Furthermore, Mauryan art especially those found on reliefs throughout stupas, depict the life of the Buddha including his birth, royal processions, the Great Departure, enlightenment, and death and entry to Nirvana.

Interestingly, although these sculptures depict other humans and various divinities in anthropomorphic forms, the Buddha is purposefully not shown in a human representation. Instead, the Buddha is depicted with various symbols. This includes a riderless horse depicting his departure from his kingdom as shown on the Bharhut stupa, Bodhi tree to depict the Shakyamuni Buddha achieving enlightenment, and the Buddha footprints to convey his legacy after moving on from this world.

There is much debate on why the Buddha was not depicted as a human unlike other sculptures found throughout Buddhist art. It is considered that the orthodox Buddhists choose not to represent the Shakyamuni Buddha out of respect, as giving him a human form would bound him to this Earth as a living being which contradicts him obtaining his goal of enlightenment and achieving moksha.

== Hellenistic art in South Asia ==
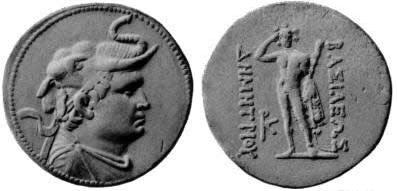
Silver coin depicting the Greco-Bactrian king Demetrius I (200–180 BC) wearing an elephant scalp, symbol of his conquest of India. Back: Herakles, holding a lion skin and a club resting over the arm. The text reads: ΒΑΣΙΛΕΩΣ ΔΗΜΗΤΡΙΟΥ – BASILÉŌS DĒMĒTRÍOU "of King Demetrius".

The clearest examples of Hellenistic art are found in the coins of the Greco-Bactrian kings of the period, such as Demetrius I of Bactria. Many coins of the Greco-Bactrian kings have been unearthed, including the largest silver and gold coins ever minted in the Hellenistic world, ranking among the best in artistic and technical sophistication: they "show a degree of individuality never matched by the often more bland descriptions of their royal contemporaries further West". ("Greece and the Hellenistic world").

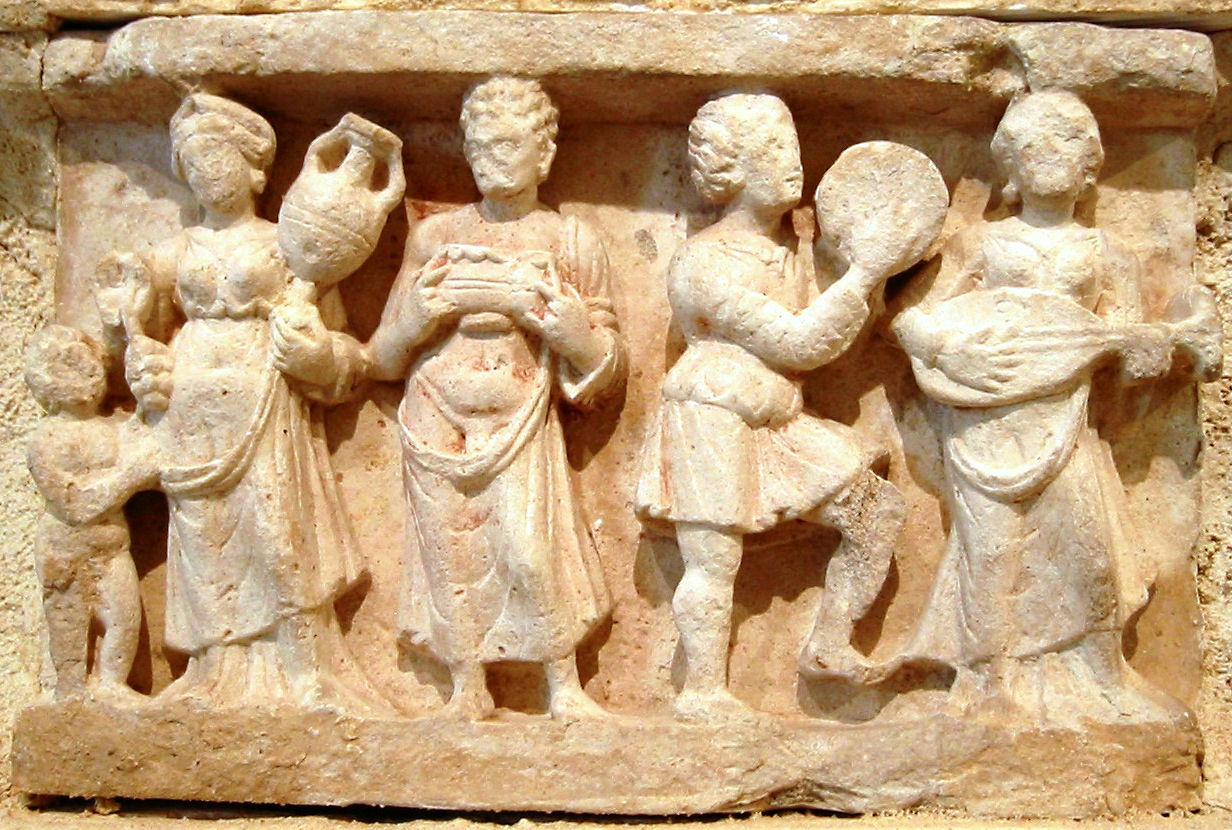
Wine-drinking and music (Detail from Chakhil-i-Ghoundi stupa, Hadda, 1st–2nd century AD).

These Hellenistic kingdoms established cities on the Greek model, such as in Ai-Khanoum in Bactria, displaying purely Hellenistic architectural features, Hellenistic statuary, and remains of Aristotelician papyrus prints and coin hoards.

These Greek elements penetrated India quite early as shown by the Hellenistic Pataliputra capital (3rd century BC) during the Maurya Era, but the influence became especially strong, particularly in northwestern India following the invasion of the Greco-Bactrians in 180 BC, with the establishment of the Indo-Greek kingdom in India. Architectural styles used Hellenistic decorative motifs such as fruit garland and scrolls. Stone palettes for aromatic oils representing purely Hellenistic themes such as a Nereid riding a Ketos sea monster are found.

== Early Gandhara creations: stone palettes (2nd century BC – 1st century AD) ==
The Greeks in Asia are well known archaeologically for their stone palettes, also called "toilet trays", round trays commonly found in the areas of Bactria and Gandhara, which usually represent Greek mythological scenes. The earliest of them are attributed to the Indo-Greek period in the 2nd and 1st century BC (a few were retrieved from the Indo-Greek stratum No.5 at Sirkap). Production continued until the time of the Indo-Parthians, but they practically disappeared after the 1st century.

Early stone palettes
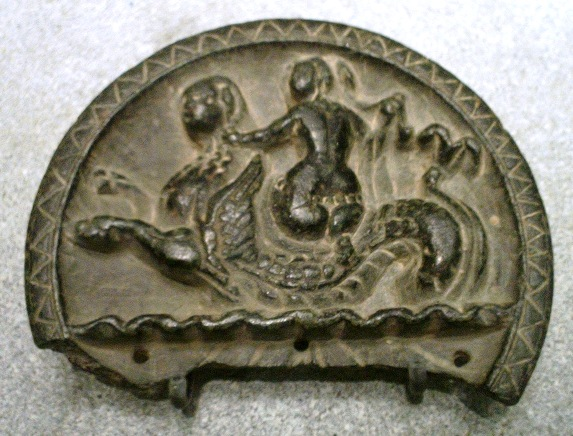
Nereid goddess riding a Ketos sea-monster, 2nd century BC, Sirkap.

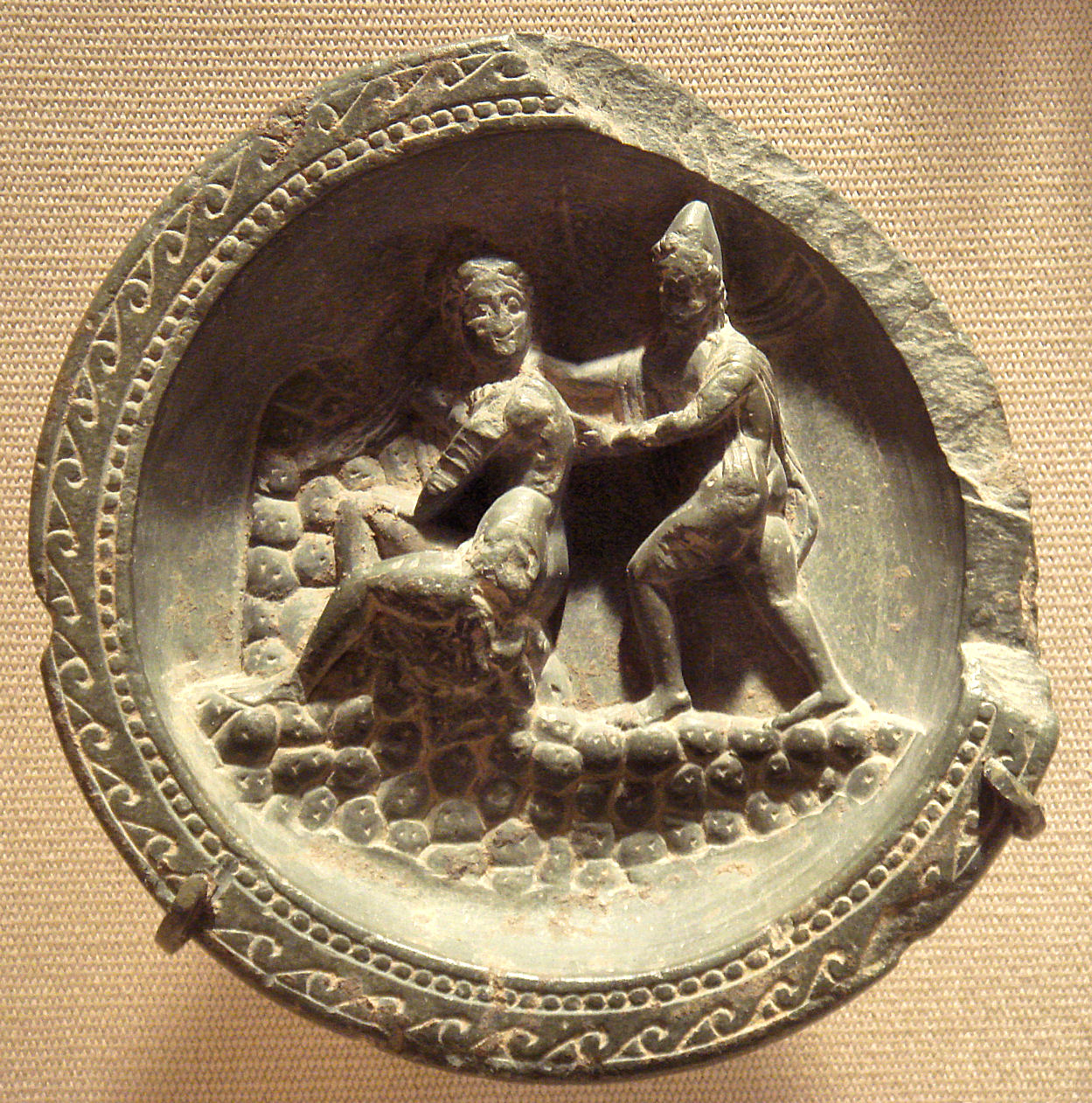
Apollo and Daphne.

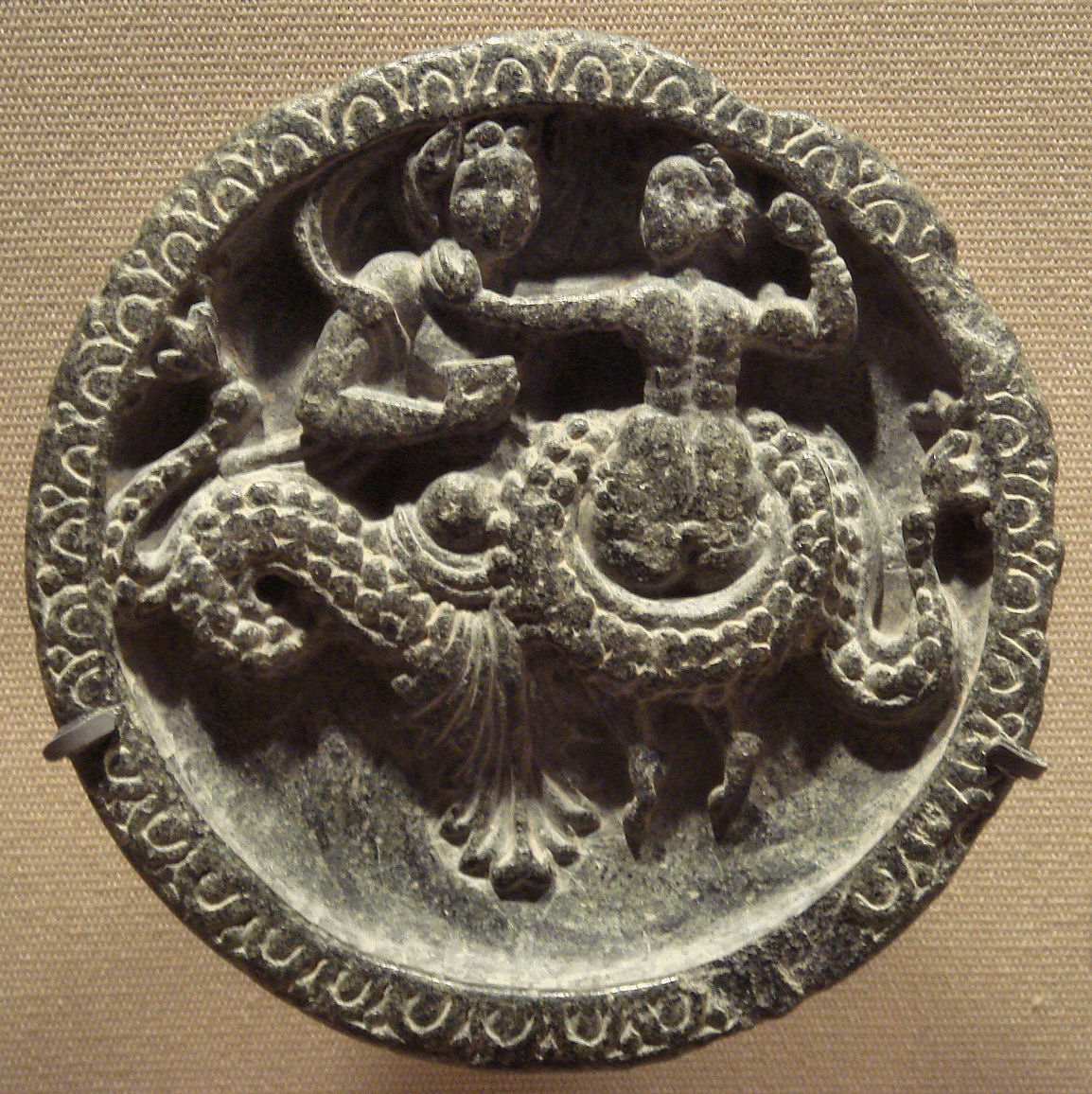
Couple with sea serpent.

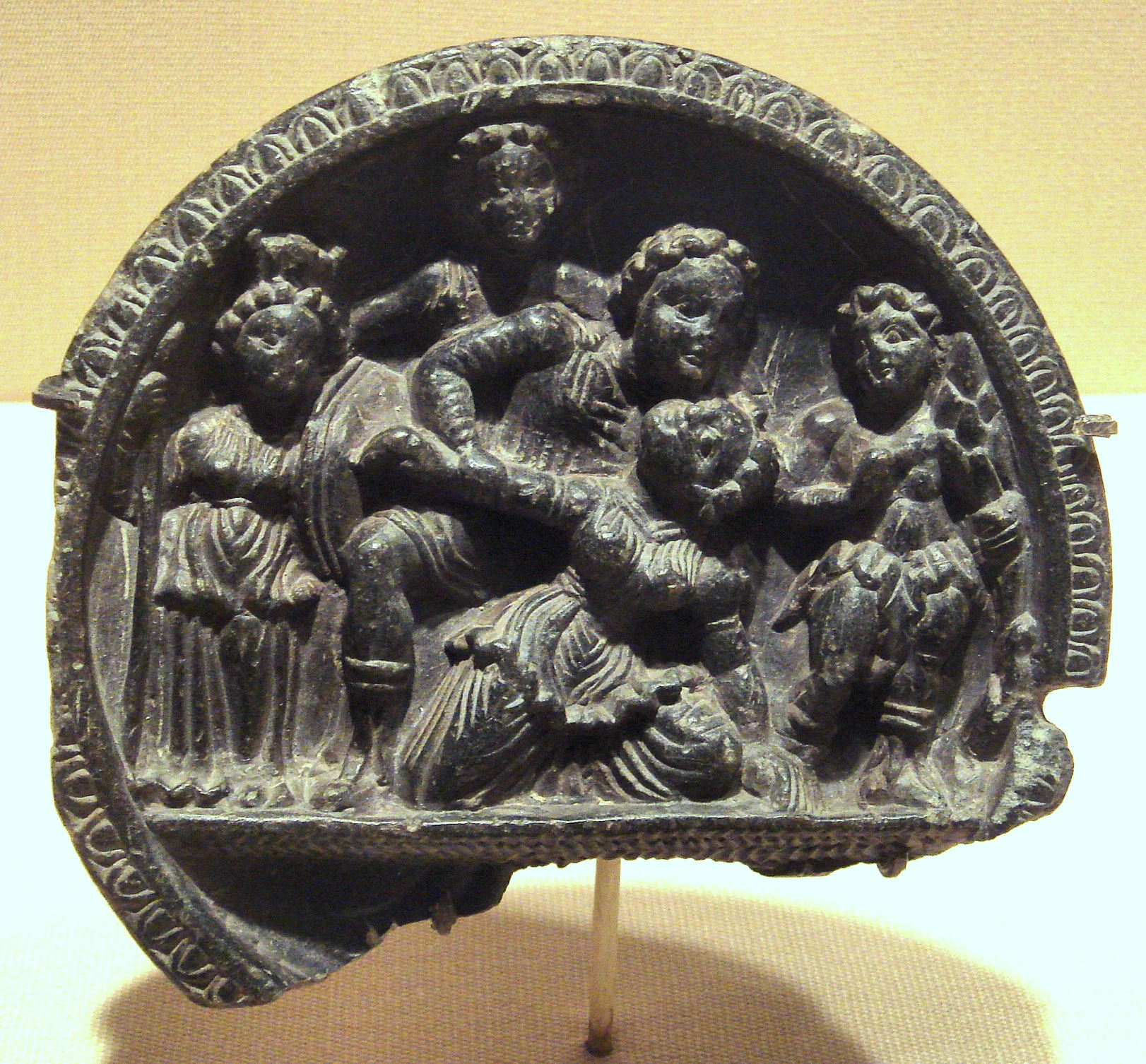
Mythological scene with Athena and Herakles.

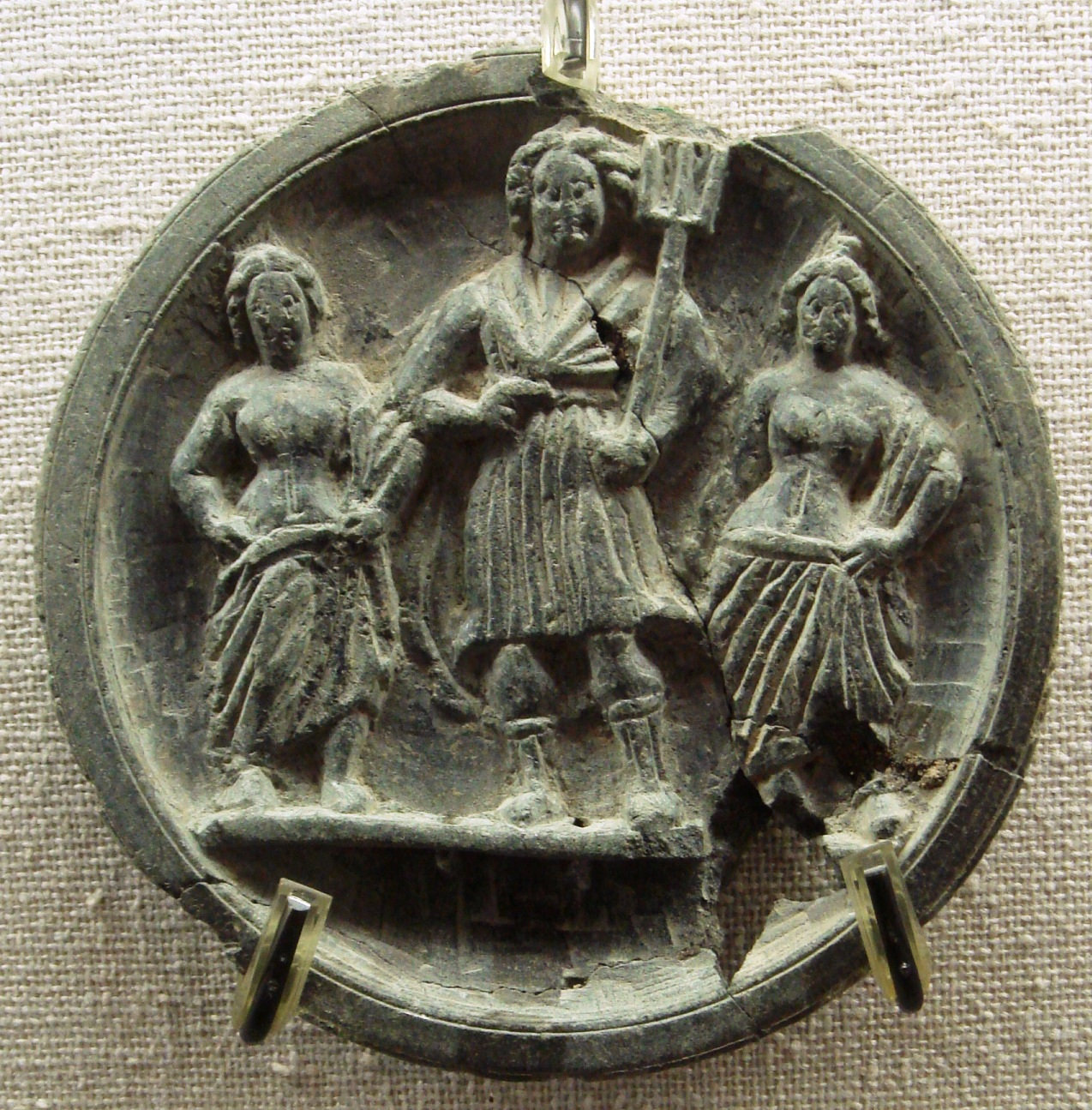
Poseidon with attendants. Ancient Orient Museum.

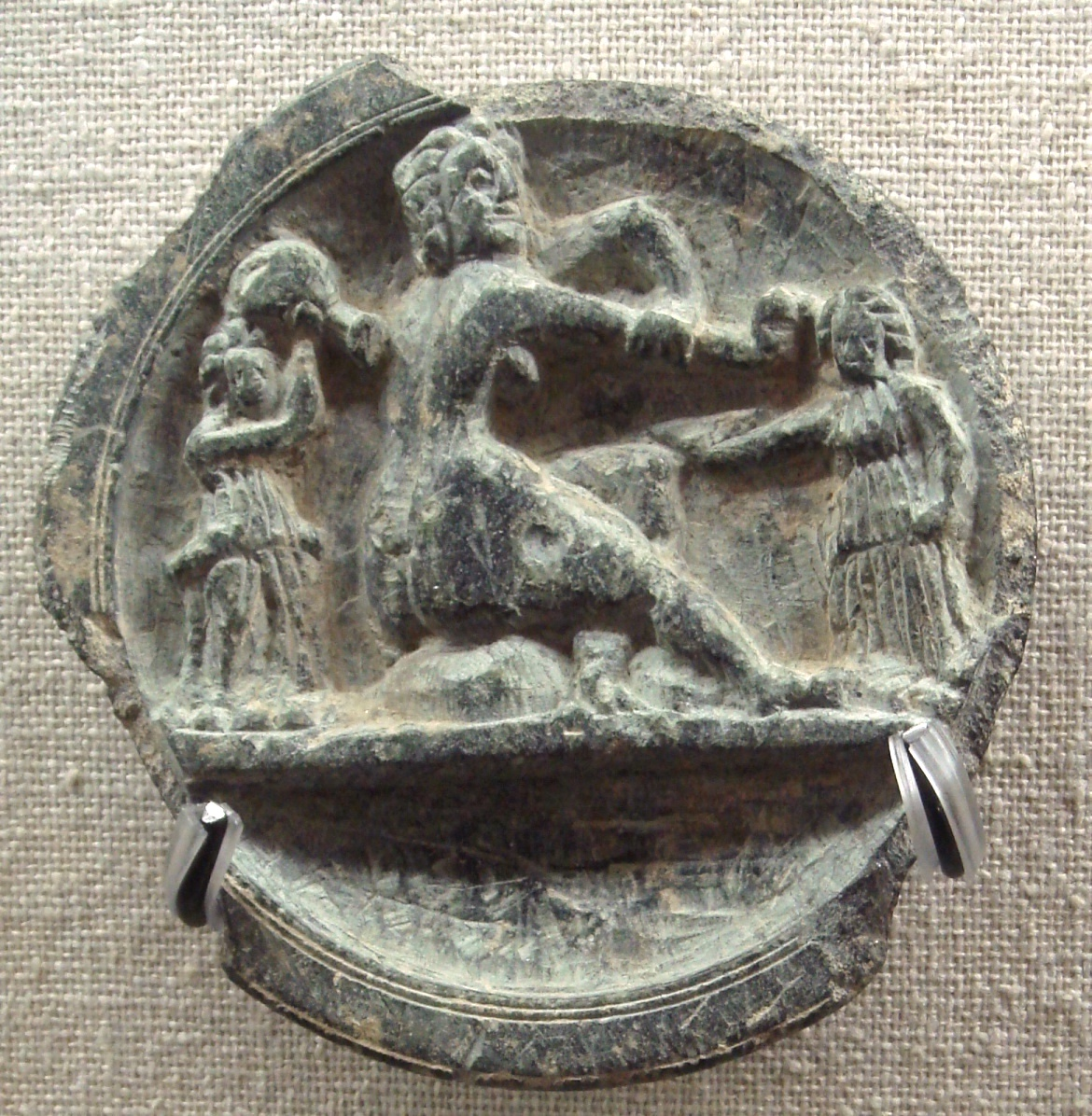
Aphrodite at her bath.

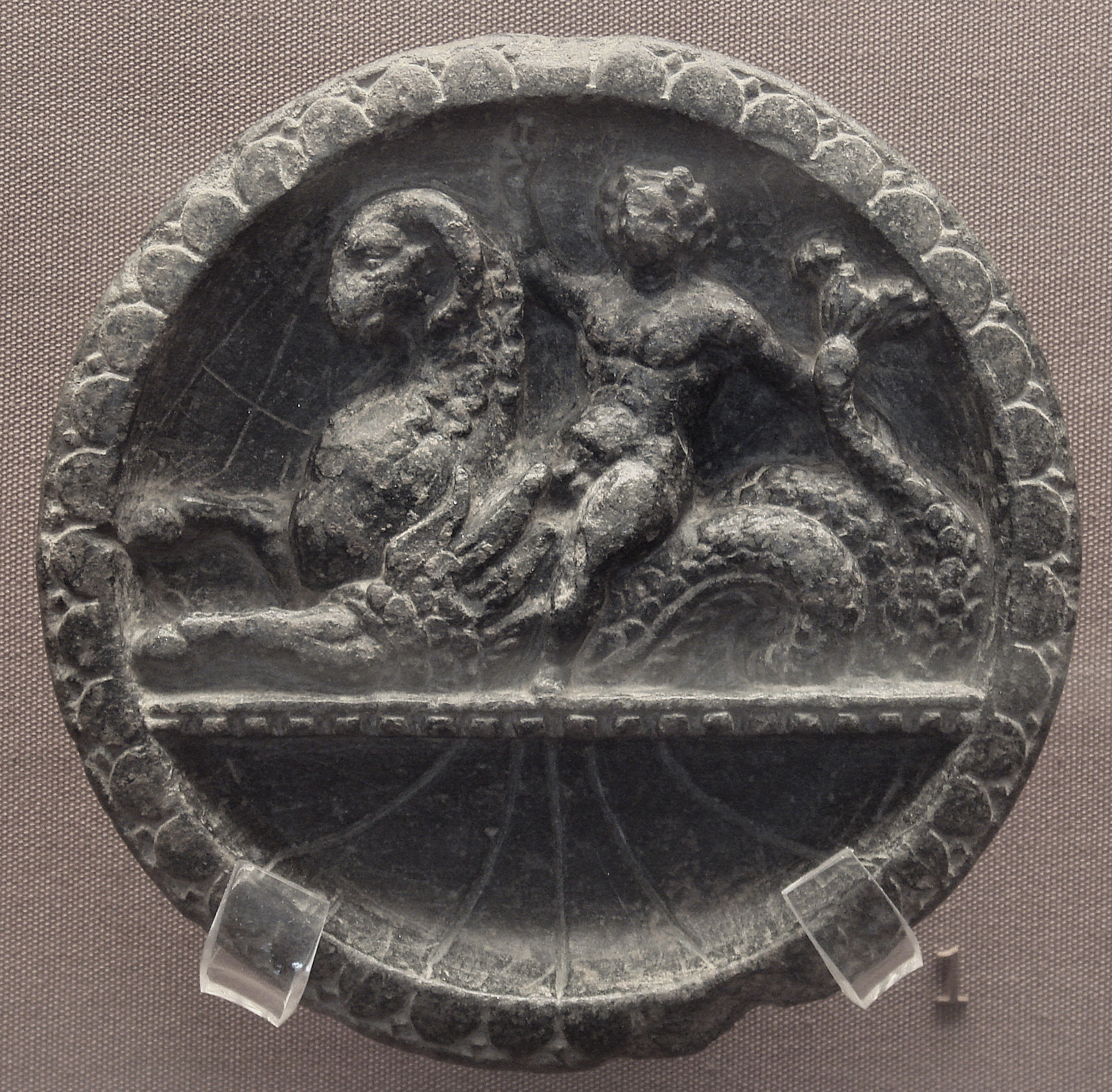
Man with cup in hand, riding a Ketos sea-monster.

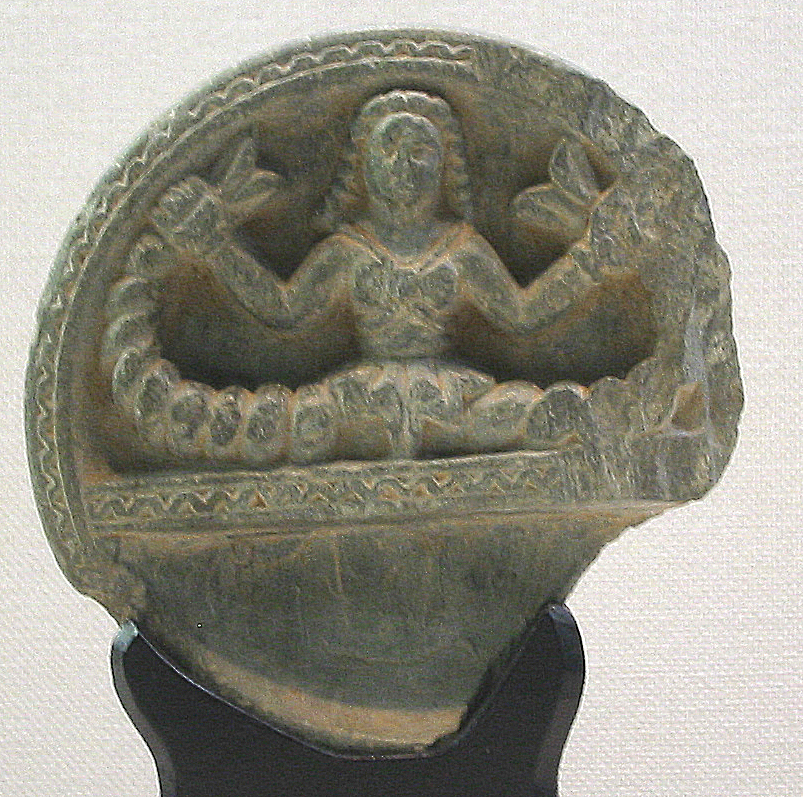
Female triton, Tokyo National Museum

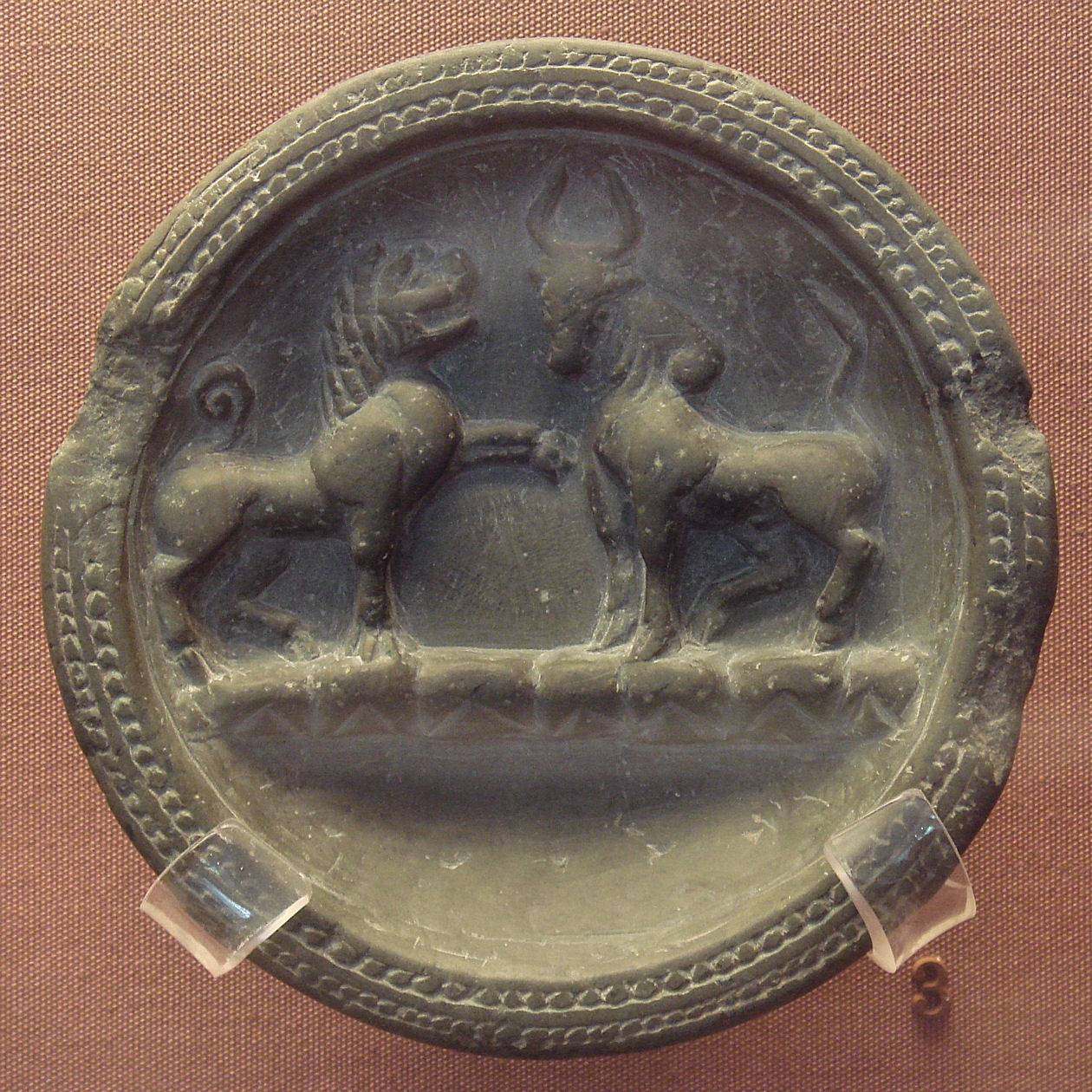
Friendly animals.

== Interaction ==
As soon as the Greeks invaded Northwestern South Asia to form the Indo-Greek kingdom, a fusion of Hellenistic and Buddhist elements started to appear, encouraged by the benevolence of the Greek kings towards Buddhism. This artistic trend then developed for several centuries and seemed to flourish further during the Kushan Empire from the 1st century AD.

=== Early contributions of Gandharan artists to Buddhist art (2nd-1st century BC) ===
According to some authors, Hellenistic sculptors had some connection with the creation of Buddhist art at Sanchi and Bharhut. The structure as a whole as well as various elements point to Hellenistic and other foreign influence, such as the fluted bell, addorsed capital of the Persepolitan order, and the abundant use of the Hellenistic flame palmette or honeysuckle motif.

==== Sanchi ====
Around 115 BC, the embassy of Heliodorus from king Antialkidas to the court of the Sungas king Bhagabhadra in Vidisha is recorded. In the Sunga capital, Heliodorus constructed the Heliodorus pillar in a dedication to Vāsudeva. This would indicate that relations between the Indo-Greeks and the Sungas had improved by that time, that people traveled between the two realms, and also that the Indo-Greeks readily followed Indian religions.

Also around the same time, circa 115 BC, it is known that architectural decorations such as decorative reliefs started to be introduced at nearby Sanchi, 6 km away from Vidisha, by craftsmen from the area of Gandhara, a central Indo-Greek region. Typically, the earliest medallions at Sanchi Stupa No.2 are dated to 115 BC, while the more extensive pillar carvings are dated to 80 BC. These early decorative reliefs were apparently the work of craftsmen from the northwest (around the area of Gandhara), since they left mason's marks in Kharoshthi, as opposed to the local Brahmi script. This seems to imply that these foreign workers were responsible for some of the earliest motifs and figures that can be found on the railings of the stupa.

Early reliefs at Sanchi, Stupa No 2 (circa 115 BC)
Sanchi, Stupa No2 Mason's marks in Kharoshti point to craftsmen from the north-west (region of Gandhara) for the earliest reliefs at Sanchi, circa 115 BC.	Foreigner on a horse. The medallions are dated circa 115 BC. Lakshmi with lotus and two child attendants, probably derived from similar images of Venus Griffin. Female riding a Centaur. Lotus within Hellenistic beads and reels motif. Floral motif.

==== Bharhut ====
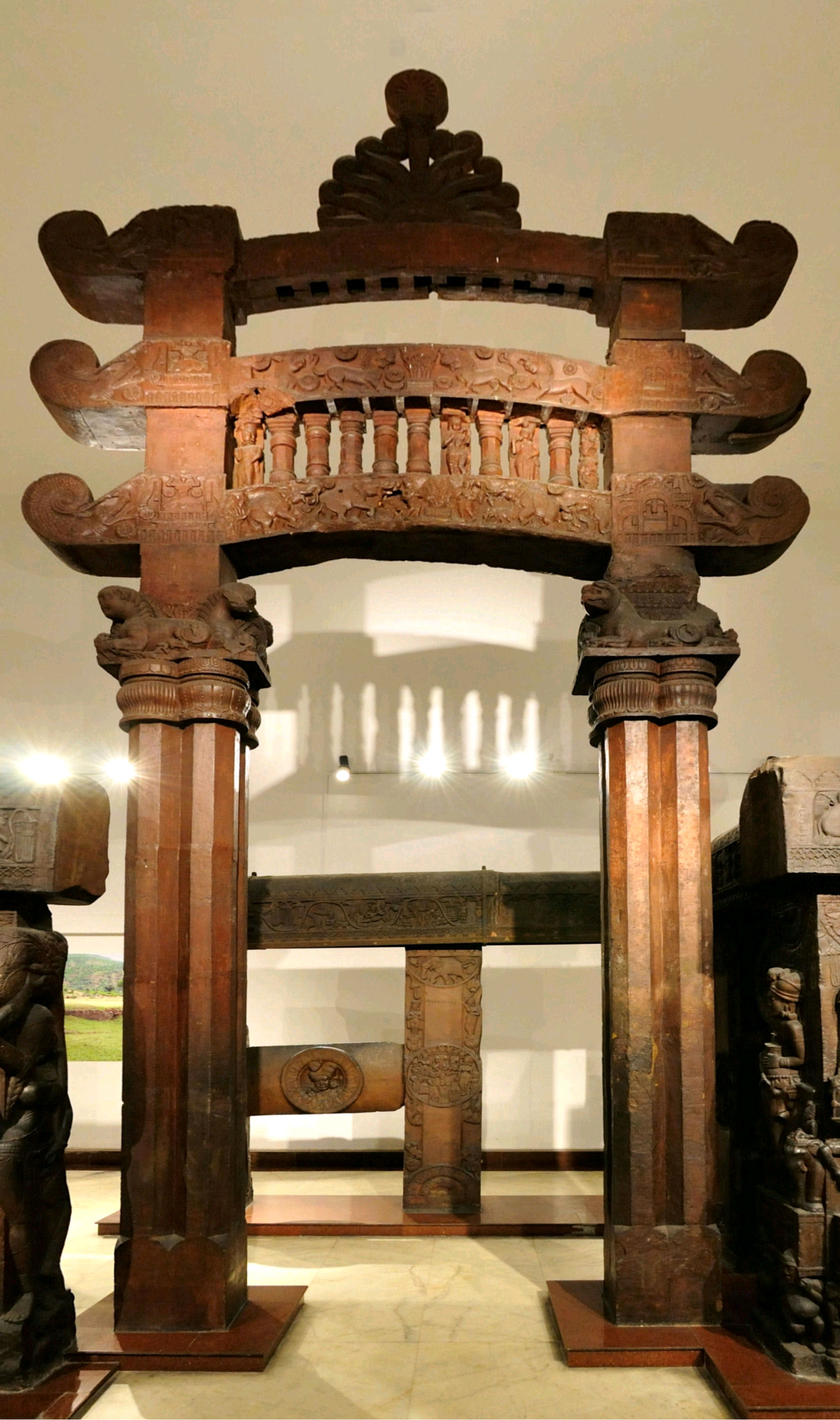
At Bharhut, the gateways were made by northern (probably Gandharan) masons using Kharosthi marks, while the railings were made by masons exclusively using marks in the local Brahmi script, now in Indian Museum. 150-100 BC.

Craftsmen from the Gandhara area, a central region of the Indo-Greek realm, are known to have been involved in the construction of the gateways at Bharhut, which are dated to 100-75 BC: this is because mason's marks in Kharosthi have been found on several elements of the Bharhut remains, indicating that some of the builders at least came from the north, particularly from Gandhara where the Kharoshti script was in use.

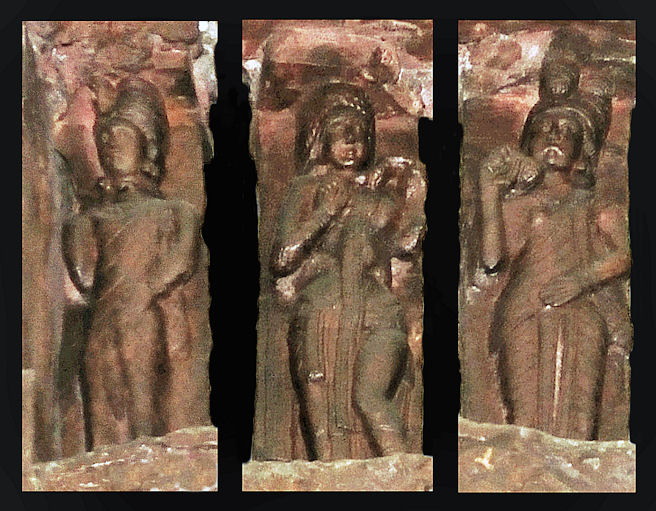
Statues on the architraves of the torana gateway, associated with Kharosthi marks. 100-75 BC.

Cunningham explained that the Kharosthi letters were found on the ballusters between the architraves of the gateway, but none on the railings which all had Indian markings, summarizing that the gateways, which are artistically more refined, must have been made by artists from the North, whereas the railings were made by local artists. The Bharhut gateway is dated to 100-75 BC (most probably 75 BC based on artistic analysis).

The structure as a whole as well as various elements point to Hellenistic and other foreign influence, such as the fluted bell, addorsed capital of the Persepolitan order, and the abundant use of the Hellenistic flame palmette or honeysuckle motif.

== Characteristics of Greco-Buddhist art ==
=== Artistic model ===
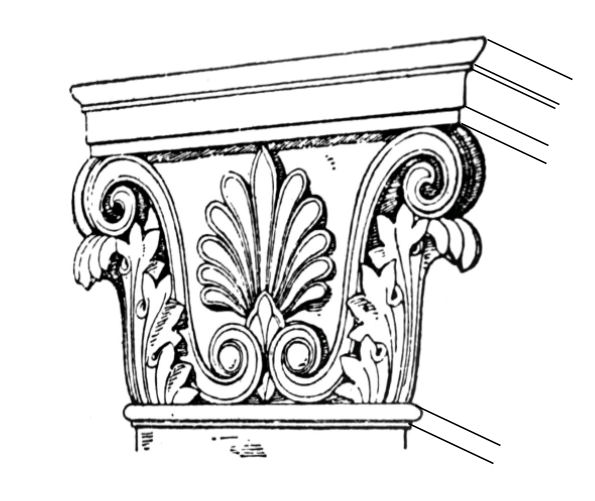
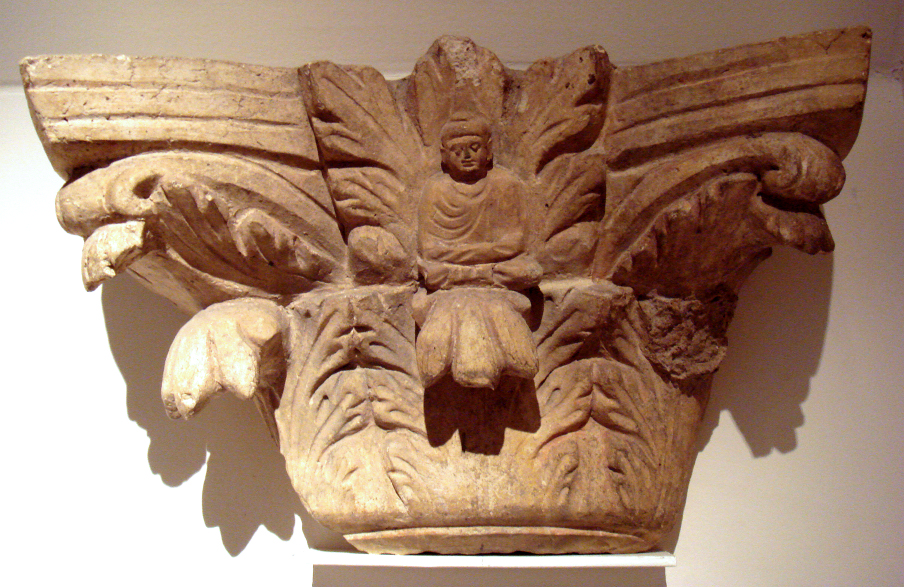
Left image: Classical Greek Corinthian anta capital.
Right image: An Indo-Corinthian capital with a palmette and the Buddha at its centre, 3-4th century, Gandhara.

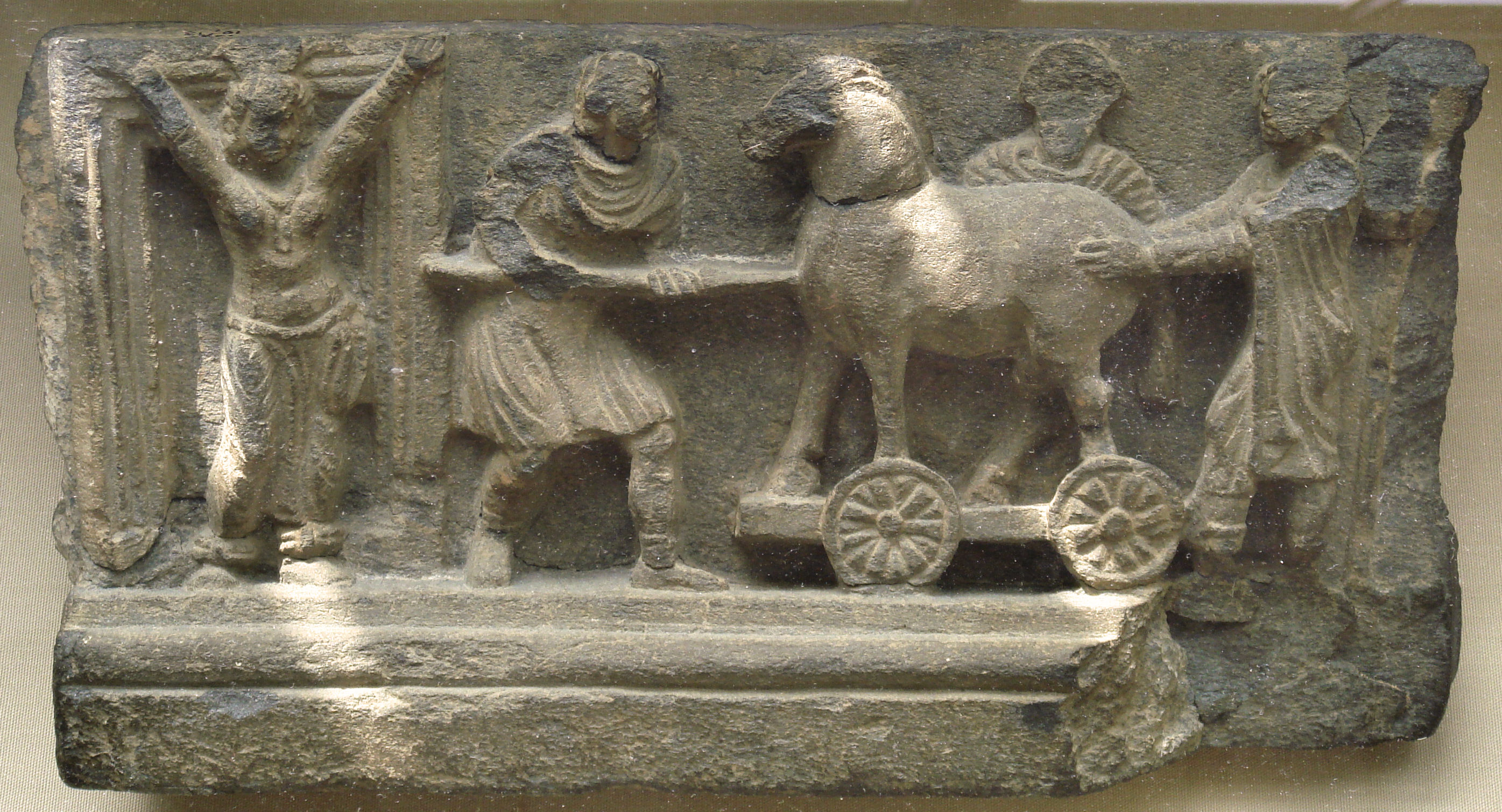
The story of the Trojan horse was depicted in the art of Gandhara. British Museum.

Later, Greco-Buddhist art depicts the life of the Buddha in art. The Bodhisattvas are depicted as bare-chested and jewelled Indian princes, and the Buddhas as Greek kings wearing the light toga-like himation. The buildings in which they are depicted incorporate Greek style, with the ubiquitous Indo-Corinthian capitals and Greek decorative scrolls. Surrounding deities form a pantheon of Greek (Atlas, Herakles) and Indian gods (Indra).

=== Material ===
Stucco as well as stone was widely used by sculptors in Gandhara for the decoration of monastic and cult buildings. Stucco provided the artist with a medium of great plasticity, enabling a high degree of expressiveness to be given to the sculpture. Sculpting in stucco was popular wherever Buddhism spread from Gandhara - India, Afghanistan, Central Asia and China.

=== Stylistic evolution ===
Stylistically, Greco-Buddhist art started by being extremely fine and realistic, as apparent on the standing Buddhas, with "a realistic treatment of the folds and on some even a hint of modelled volume that characterizes the best Greek work" (Boardman). It then lost this sophisticated realism, becoming progressively more symbolic and decorative over the centuries.

=== Architecture ===
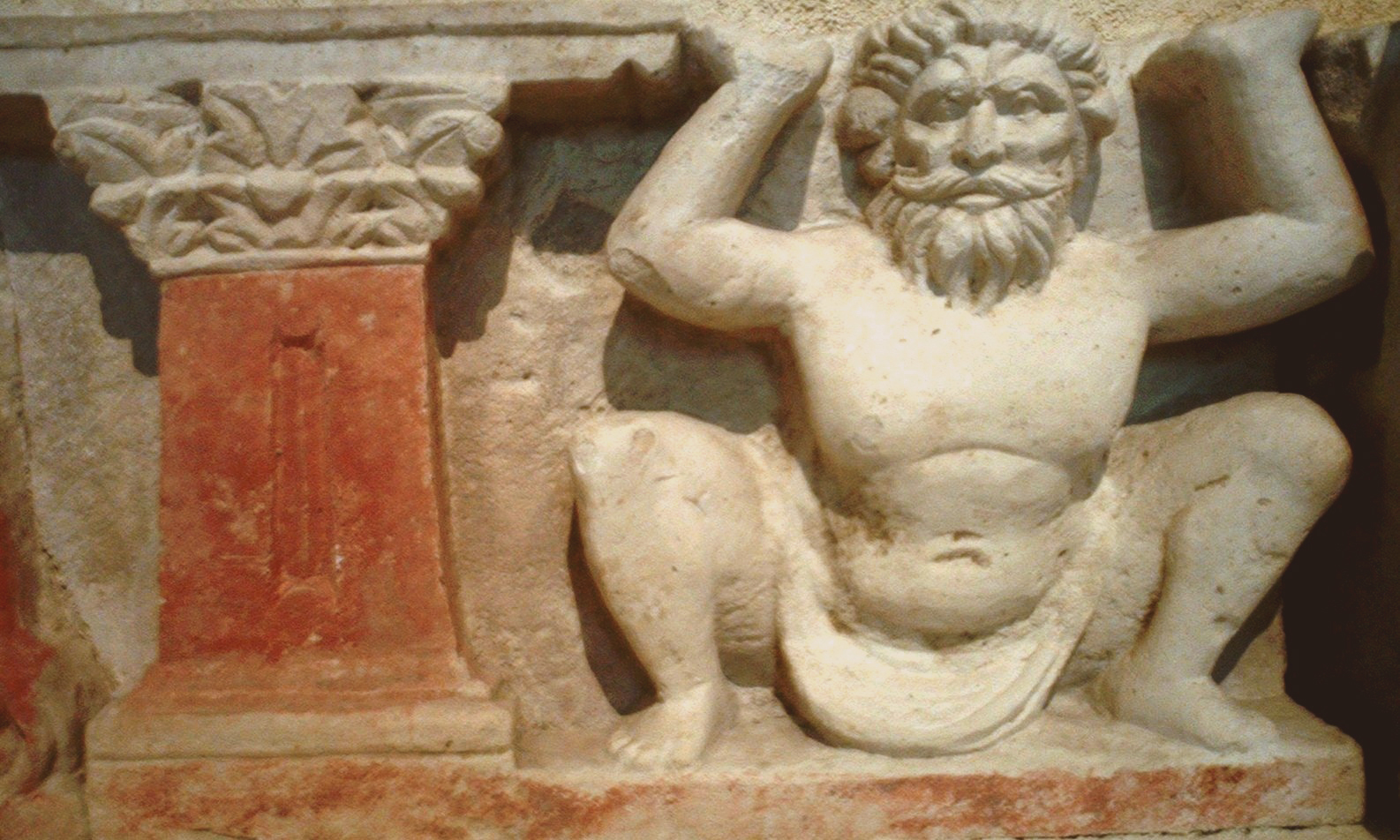
The Titan Atlas, supporting a Buddhist monument, Hadda.

The presence of stupas at the Greek city of Sirkap, which was built by Demetrius around 180 BC, already indicates a strong syncretism between Hellenism and the Buddhist faith, together with other religions such as Hinduism and Zoroastrianism. The style is Greek, adorned with Corinthian columns in excellent Hellenistic execution.

Later in Hadda, the Greek divinity Atlas is represented holding Buddhist monuments with decorated Greek columns. The motif was adopted extensively throughout the Indian sub-continent, Atlas being substituted for the Indian Yaksa in the monuments of the Shunga Empire around the 2nd century BC.

=== Buddha ===
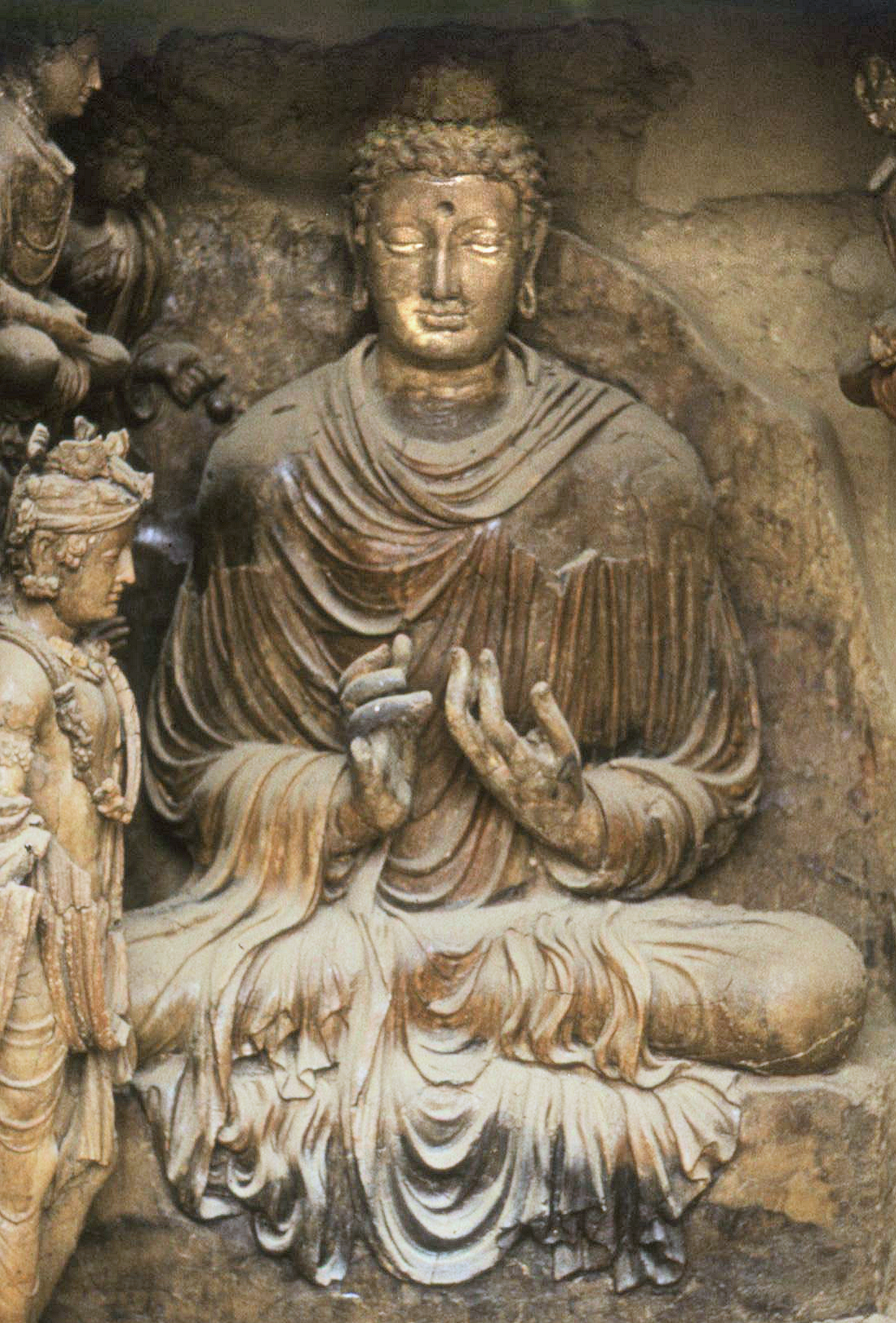
Seated Buddha in Hellenistic style, Tapa Shotor, 2nd century AD.

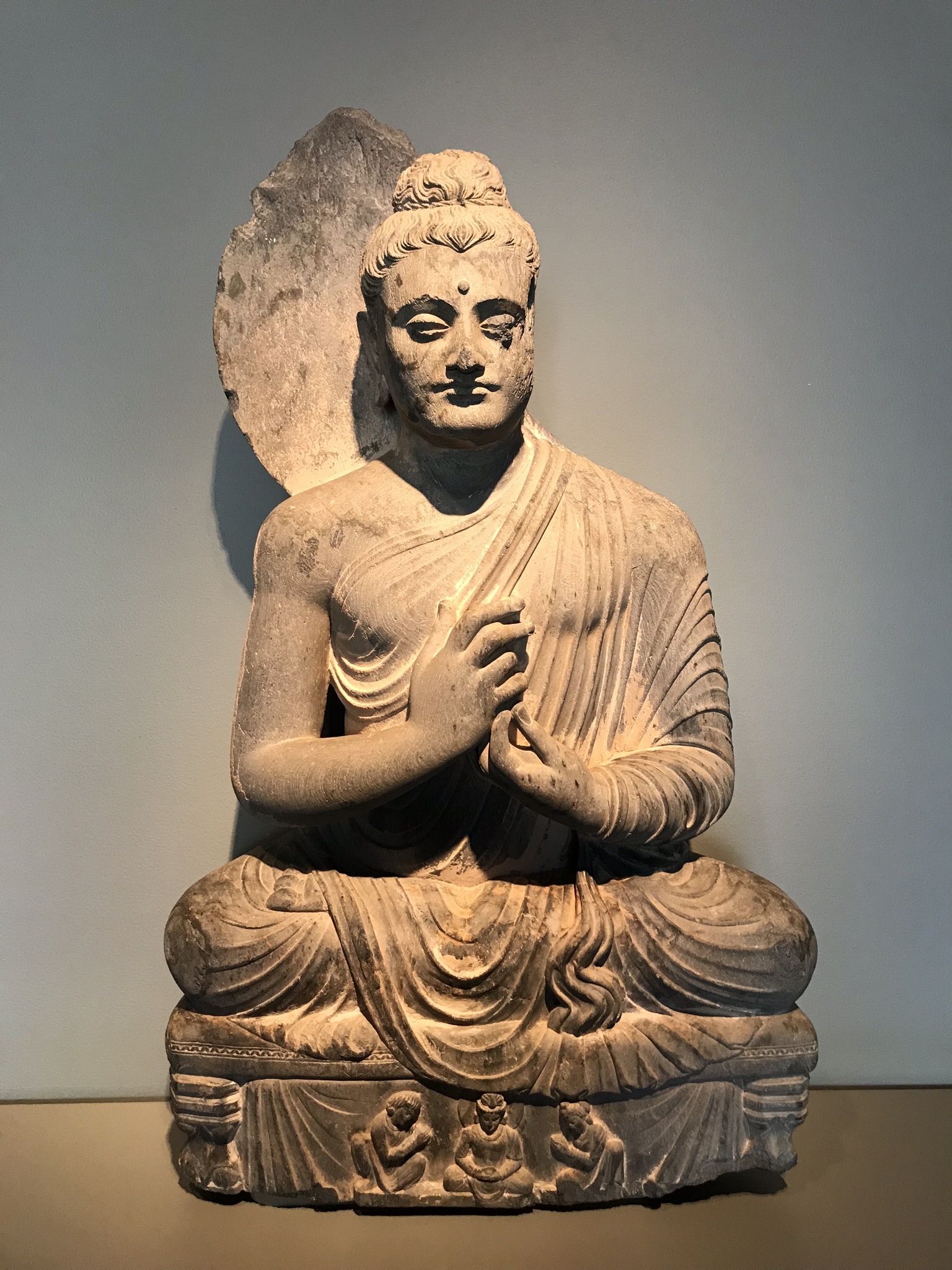
Seated Buddha, 300-500 AD, from near Jamal Garhi, Pakistan, now Asian Art Museum in San Francisco.

Sometime between the 2nd century BC and the 1st century AD, the first anthropomorphic representations of the Buddha were developed. These were absent from earlier strata of Buddhist art, which preferred to represent the Buddha with symbols such as the stupa, the Bodhi tree, the empty seat, the wheel, or the footprints. But the innovative anthropomorphic Buddha image immediately reached a very high level of sculptural sophistication, naturally inspired by the sculptural styles of Hellenistic Greece.

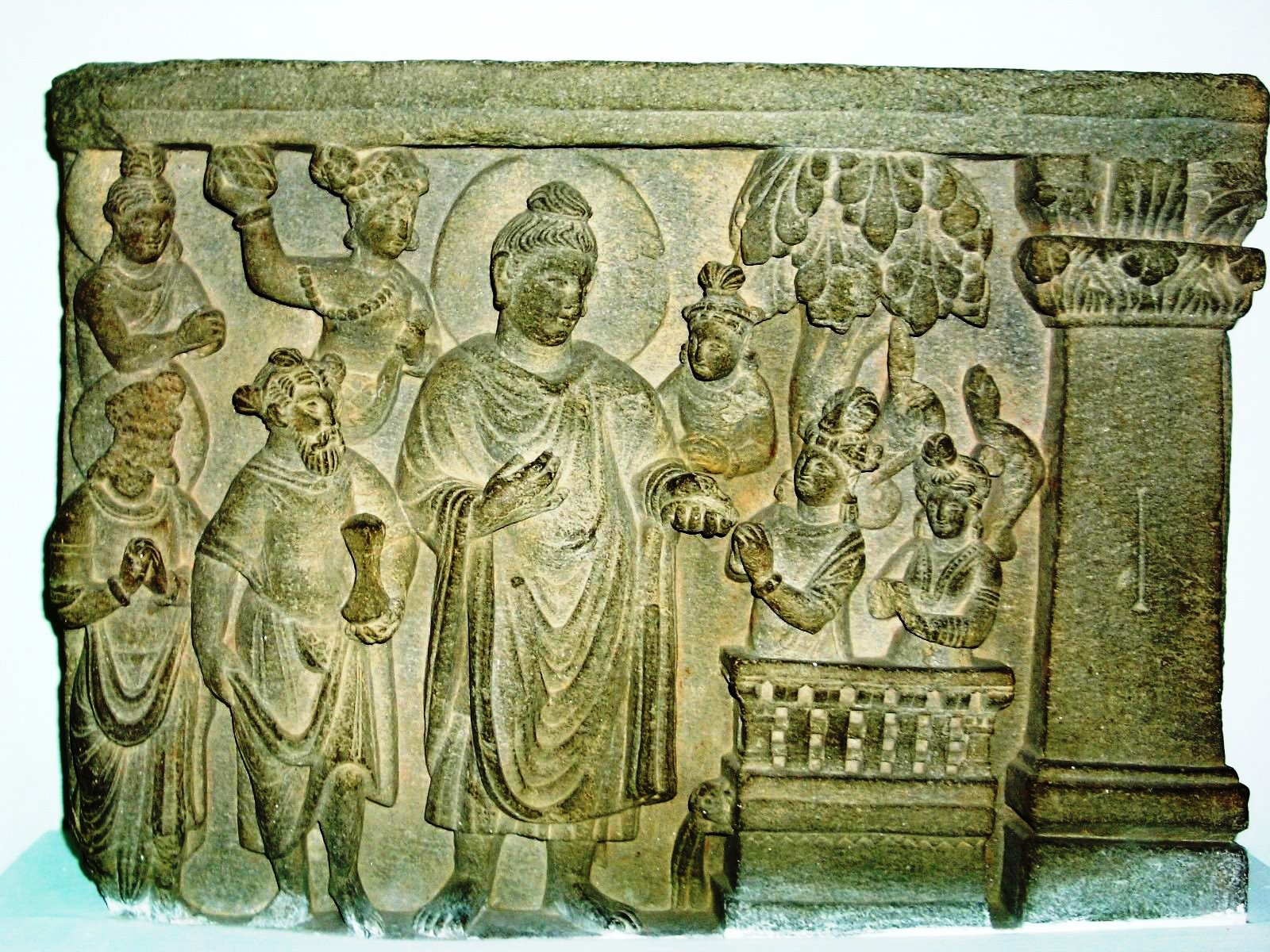
Buddha teaching. Kushan period. National Museum, Delhi

Many of the stylistic elements in the representations of the Buddha point to Greek influence: the Greek himation (a light toga-like wavy robe covering both shoulders: Buddhist characters are always represented with a dhoti loincloth before this innovation), the halo, the contrapposto stance of the upright figures, the stylized Mediterranean curly hair and top-knot apparently derived from the style of the Belvedere Apollo (330 BC), and the measured quality of the faces, all rendered with strong artistic realism (See: Greek art). Some of the standing Buddhas (as the one pictured) were sculpted using the specific Greek technique of making the hands and sometimes the feet in marble to increase the realistic effect, and the rest of the body in another material.

Foucher especially considered Hellenistic free-standing Buddhas as "the most beautiful, and probably the most ancient of the Buddhas", assigning them to the 1st century BC, and making them the starting point of the anthropomorphic representations of the Buddha ("The Buddhist art of Gandhara", Marshall, p101).

==== Development ====
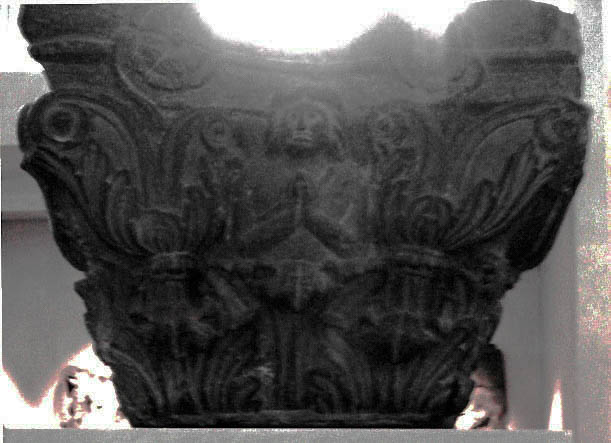
An Indo-Corinthian capital from the Butkara Stupa under which a coin of Azes II was found. Dated to 20 BC or earlier (Turin City Museum of Ancient Art).

There is some debate regarding the exact date for the development of the anthropomorphic representation of the Buddha, and this has a bearing on whether the innovation came directly from the Indo-Greeks, or was a later development by the Indo-Scythians, the Indo-Parthians or the Kushans under Hellenistic artistic influence. Most of the early images of the Buddha (especially those of the standing Buddha) are anepigraphic, which makes it difficult to date definitely. The earliest known image of the Buddha with approximate dating is the Bimaran casket, which was found buried with coins of the Indo-Scythian king Azes II (or possibly Azes I), indicating a 30–10 BC date, although this date is not undisputed.

Such dating, as well as the general Hellenistic style and pose of the Buddha on the Bimaran casket (himation dress, contrapposto pose, general depiction) makes it a possible Indo-Greek work, used in dedications by Indo-Scythians soon after the end of Indo-Greek rule in Gandhara. Since it already displays quite a sophisticated iconography (Brahma and Śakra as attendants, Bodhisattvas) in an advanced style, it would suggest much earlier representations of the Buddha were already current by that time, going back to the rule of the Indo-Greeks (Alfred A. Foucher and others). The next datable findings come later, such as the Kanishka casket (dates ranging from 78 to 325 AD) and Kanishka's Buddhist coins. These works indicate that the anthropomorphic representation of the Buddha was already extant in the 1st century AD.

Chinese texts and mural paintings in the Tarim Basin city of Dunhuang describe ambassador Zhang Qian traveling to Central Asia, as far as Bactria around 130 BC. The same murals describe Emperor Wu (156–87 BC) worshipping Buddhist statues, explaining them as "golden men brought in 120 BC by a great Han general in his campaigns against the nomads." Although there is no other mention of Emperor Wu worshipping the Buddha in Chinese historical literature, the murals suggest that statues of the Buddha were already in existence during the 2nd century BC, connecting them directly to the time of the Indo-Greeks.

The Book of Later Han describes the enquiry about Buddhism made around AD 67 by the emperor Emperor Ming (AD 58–75). He sent an envoy to the Yuezhi in northwestern India, who brought back paintings and statues of the Buddha, confirming their existence before that date:

"The Emperor, to discover the true doctrine, sent an envoy to Tianzhu (India) to inquire about the Buddha’s doctrine, after which paintings and statues [of the Buddha] appeared in the Middle Kingdom." (Book of Later Han, trans. John Hill)

==== Artistic model ====
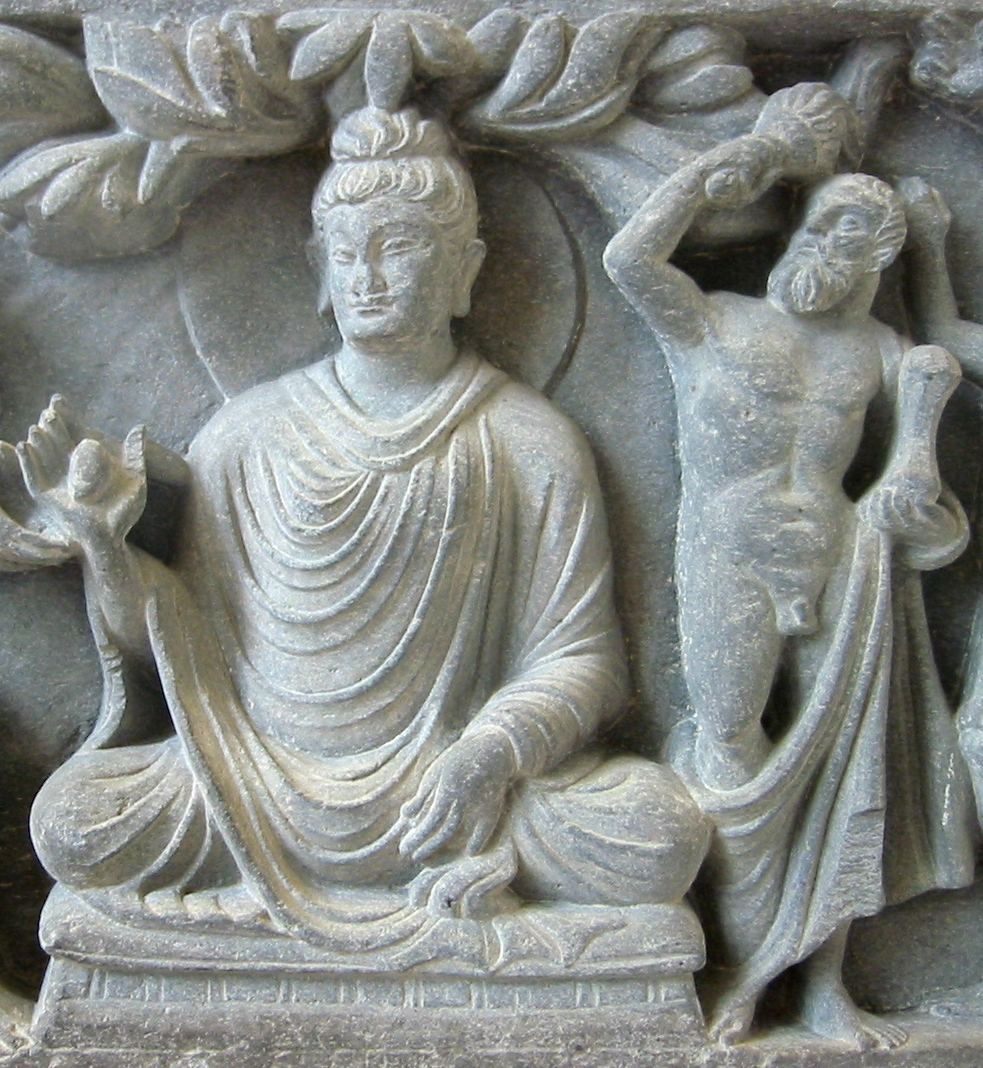
Heracles depiction of Vajrapani as the protector of the Buddha, 2nd century AD, Gandhara, British Museum.

In Gandharan art, the Buddha is often shown under the protection of the Greek god Herakles, standing with his club (and later a diamond rod) resting over his arm. This unusual representation of Herakles is the same as the one on the back of Demetrius' coins, and it is exclusively associated to him (and his son Euthydemus II), seen only on the back of his coins.

Soon, the figure of the Buddha was incorporated within architectural designs, such as Corinthian pillars and friezes. Scenes of the life of the Buddha are typically depicted in a Greek architectural environment, with protagonist wearing Greek clothes.

=== Gods and Bodhisattvas ===
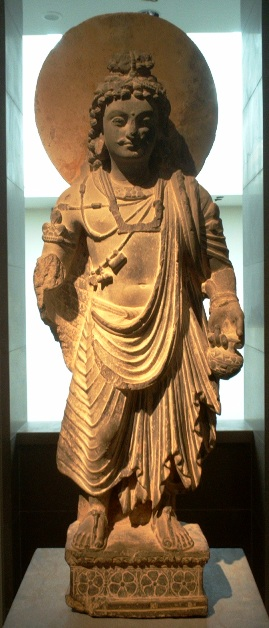
The Bodhisattva Maitreya, 2nd century AD, Gandhara.

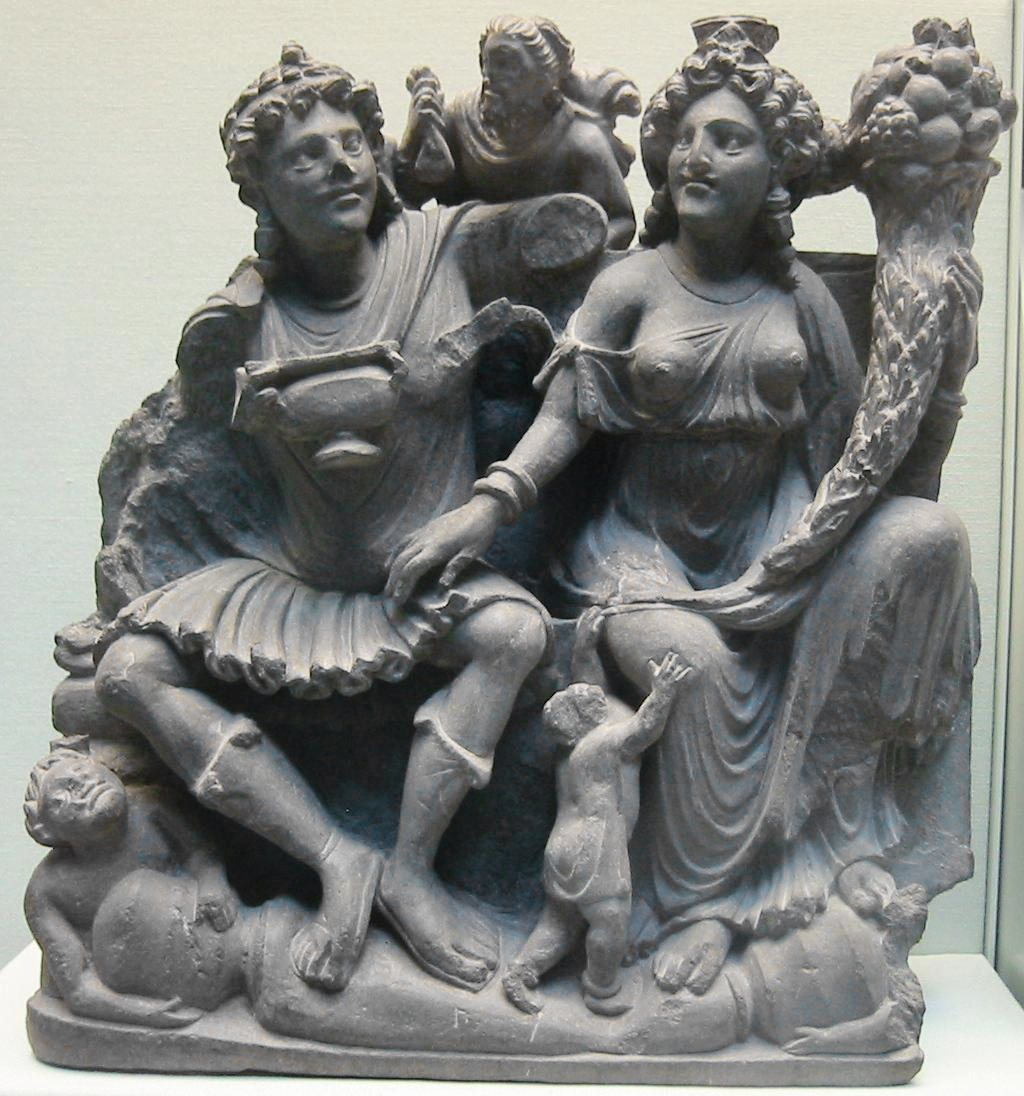
The Buddhist gods Pancika (left) and Hariti (right), 3rd century, Takht-i Bahi, Gandhara, British Museum.

Deities from the Greek mythological pantheon also tend to be incorporated in Buddhist representations, displaying a strong syncretism. In particular, Herakles (of the type of the Demetrius coins, with club resting on the arm) has been used abundantly as the representation of Vajrapani, the protector of the Buddha. Other Greek deities abundantly used in Greco-Buddhist art are representation of Atlas, and the Greek wind god Boreas. Atlas in particular tends to be involved as a sustaining elements in Buddhist architectural elements. Boreas became the Japanese wind god Fujin through the Greco-Buddhist Wardo/Oado and Chinese Feng Bo/Feng Po ("Uncle Wind"; among various other names). The mother deity Hariti was inspired by Tyche.

Particularly under the Kushans, there are also numerous representations of richly adorned, princely Bodhisattvas all in a very realistic Greco-Buddhist style. The Bodhisattvas, characteristic of the Mahayana form of Buddhism, are represented under the traits of Kushan princes, completed with their canonical accessories.

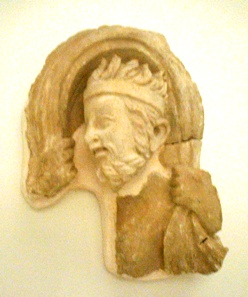
Fragment of the wind god Boreas, Hadda, Afghanistan.

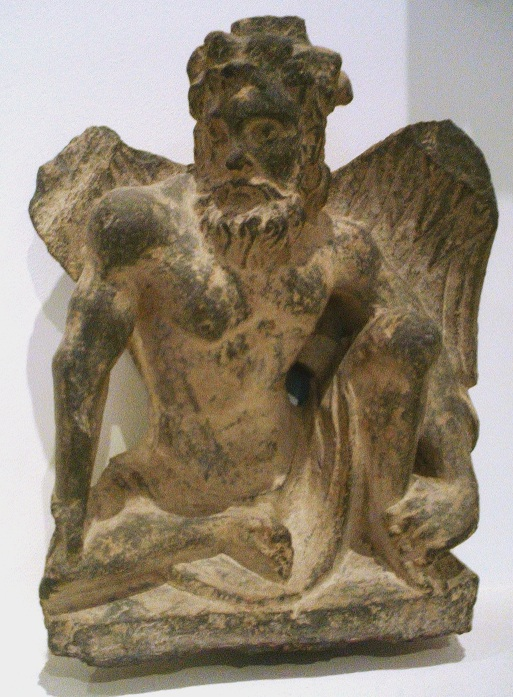
Gandharan atlant

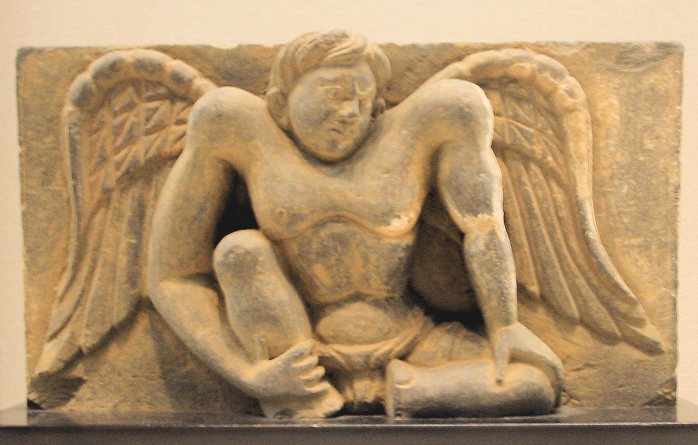
Winged atlant.

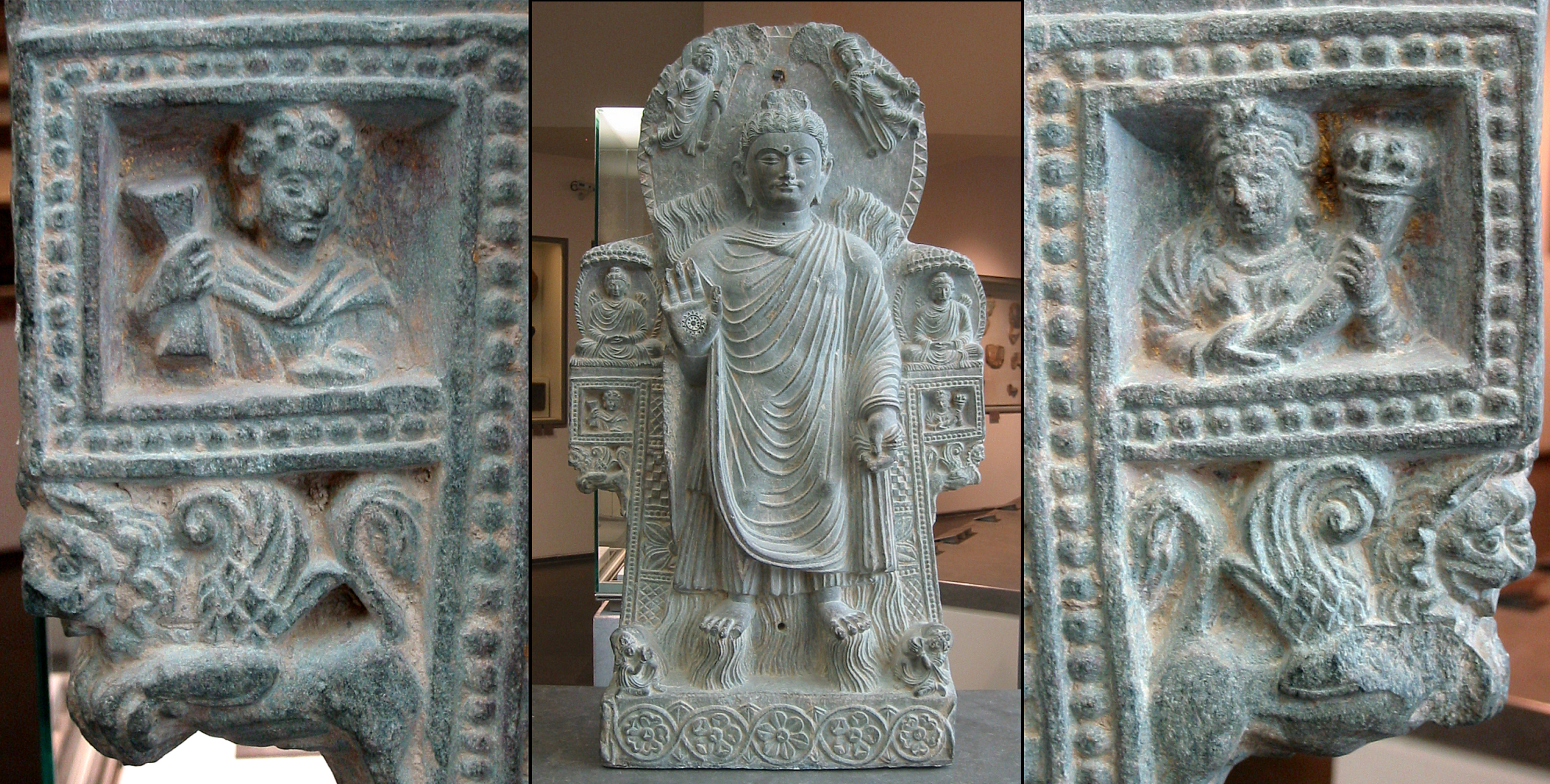
The Buddha, flanked by Herakles/ Vajrapani and Tyche/ Hariti.

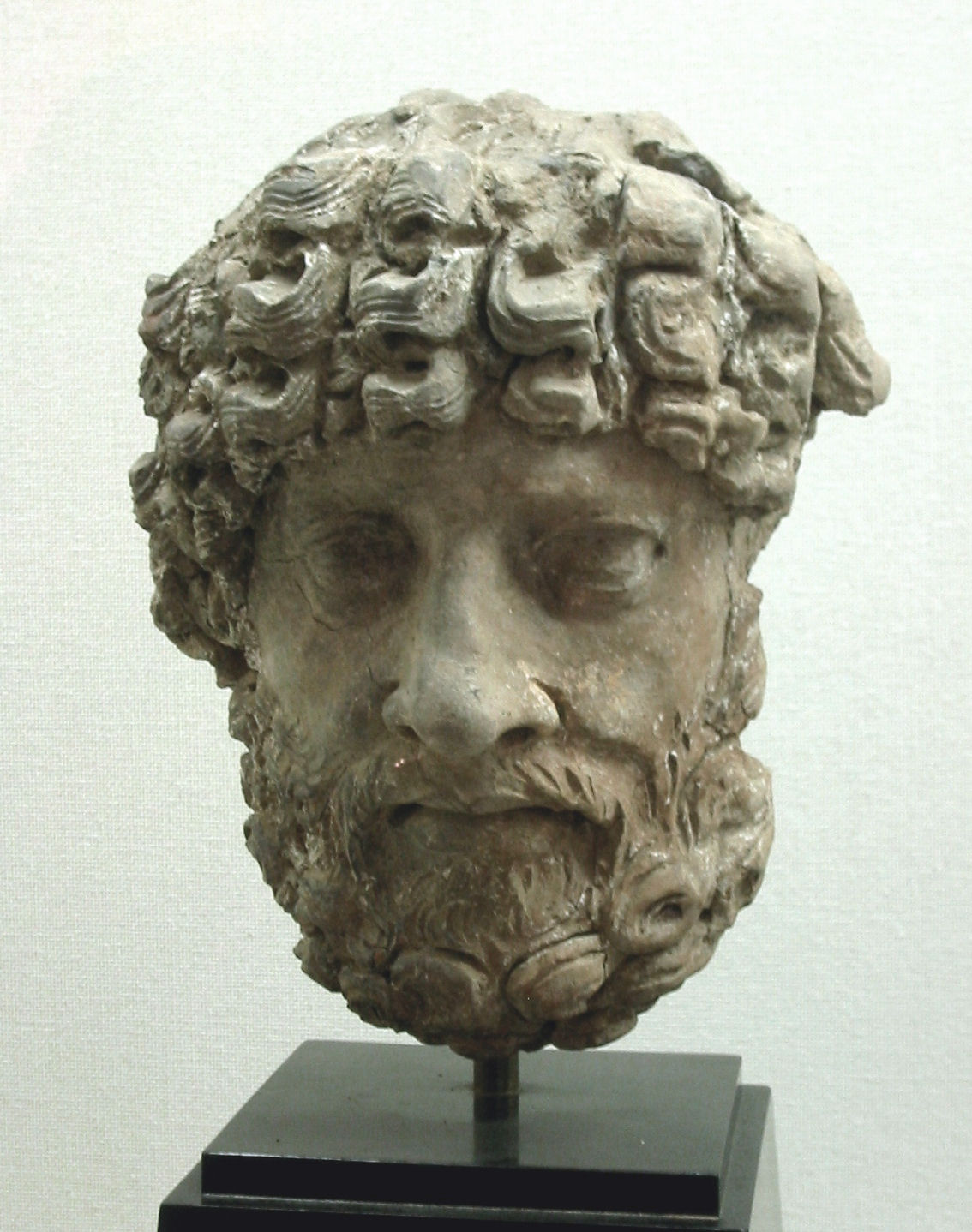
Gandhara Poseidon (Ancient Orient Museum)

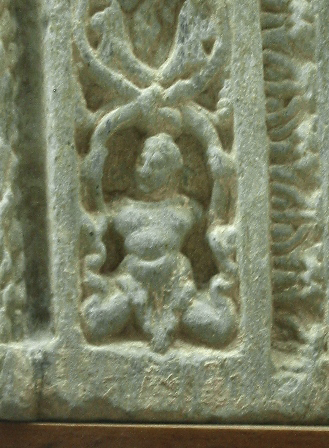
Triton

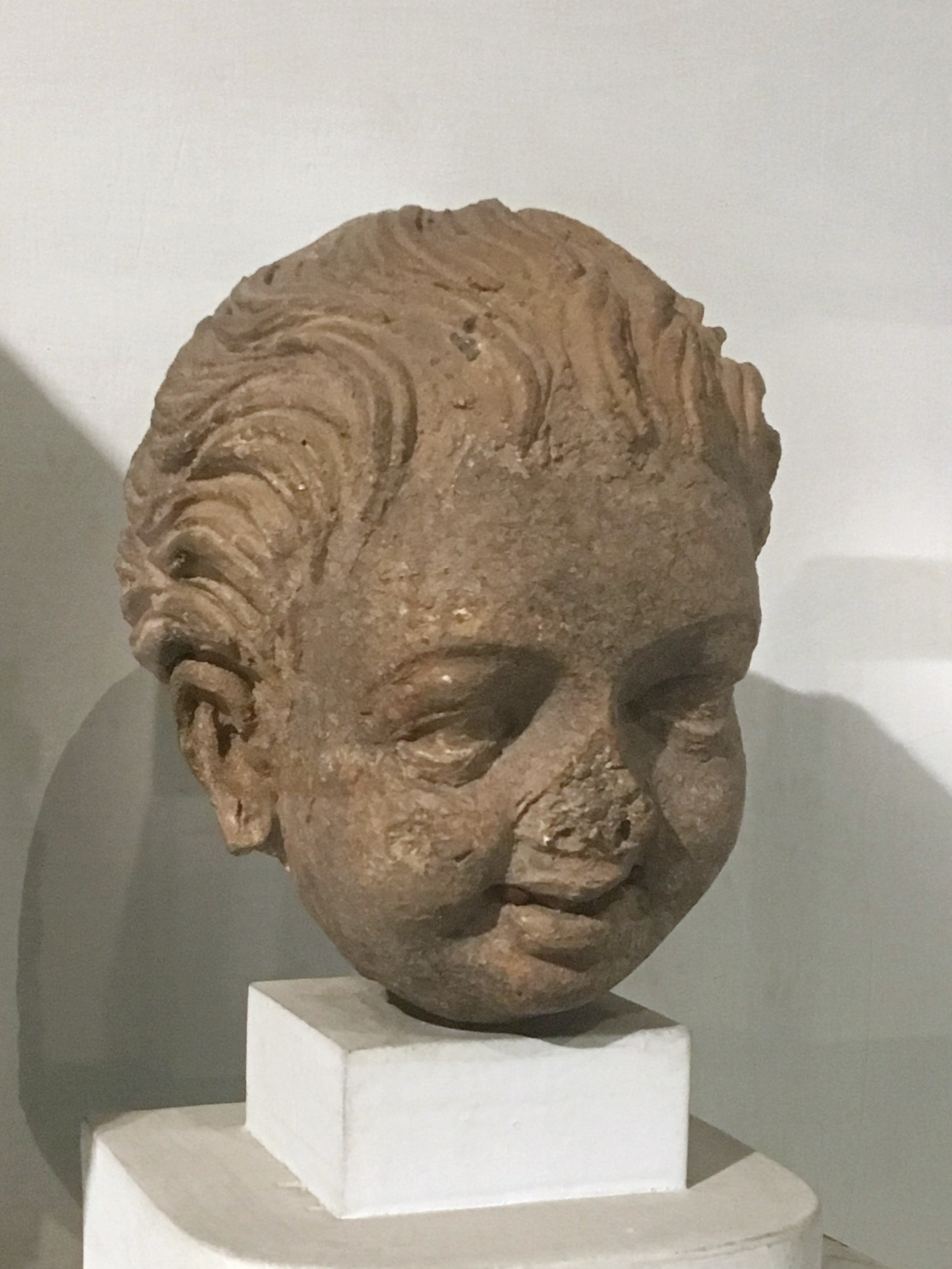
"Laughing boy" from Hadda

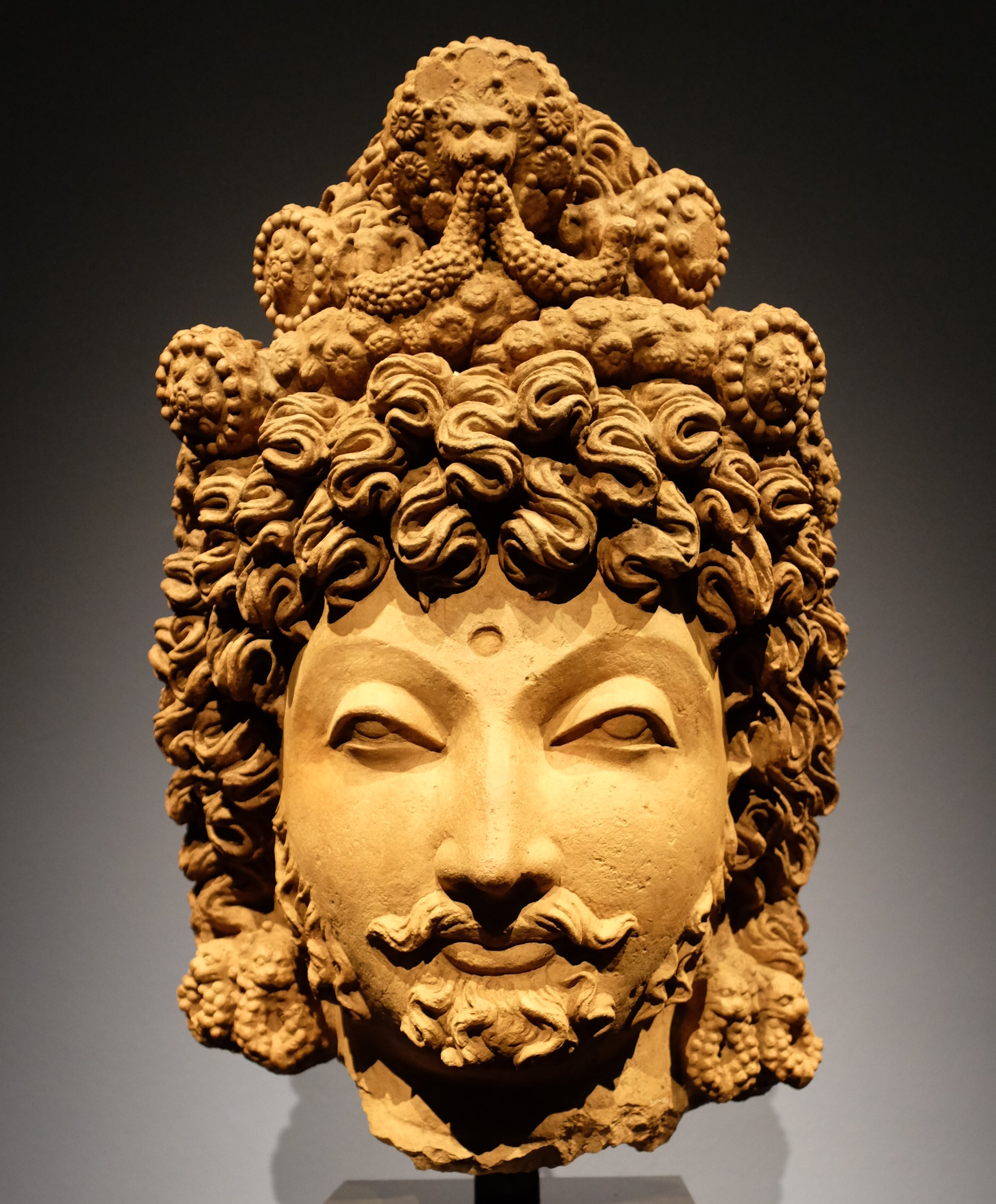
Head of a bodhisattva, Gandhara ca. 4th century

=== Cupids ===
Garland bearers

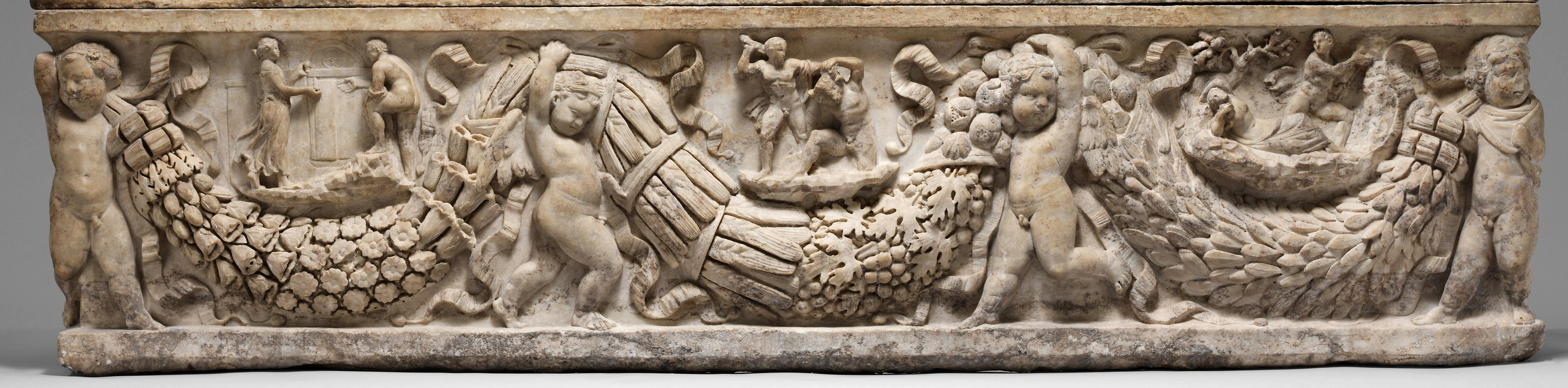
Garland bearers on a Roman sarcophagus, found in the vicinity of Rome, 130-150 AD.

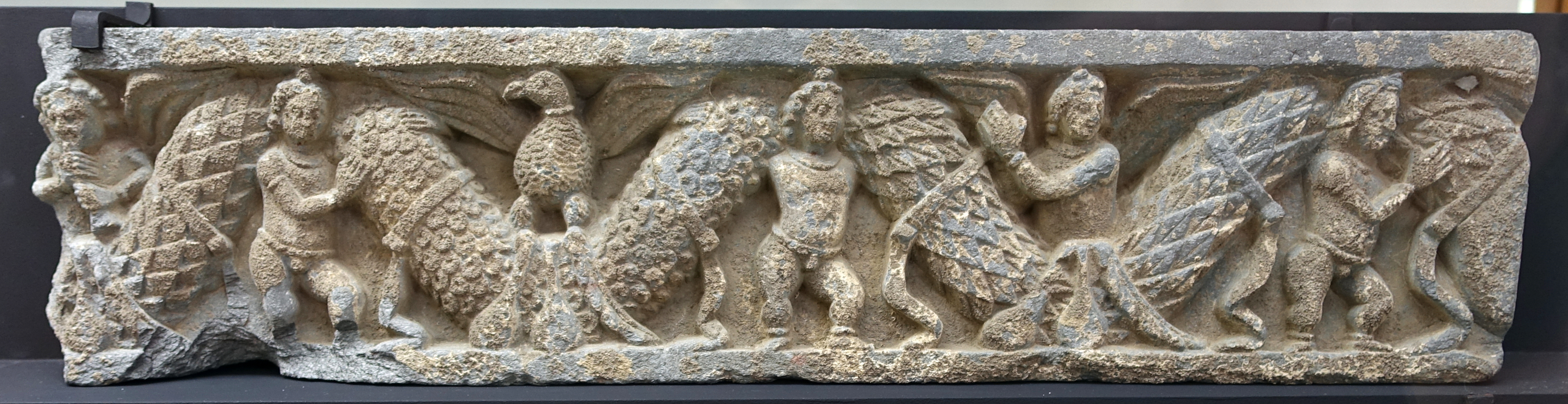
Garland bearers, Gandhara, c. 2nd-3rd century AD.

Winged cupids are another popular motif in Greco-Buddhist art. They usually fly in pair, holding a wreath, the Greek symbol of victory and kingship, over the Buddha.

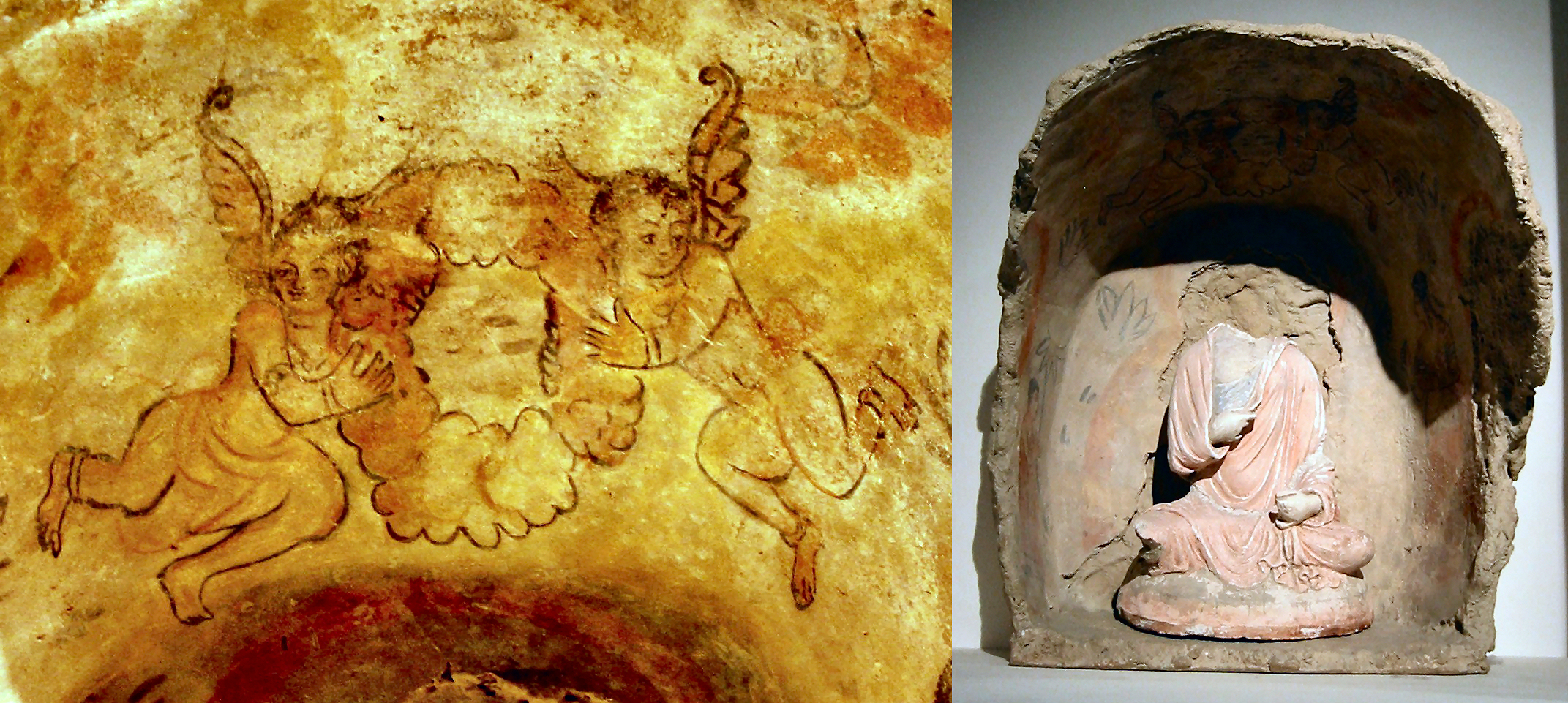
Winged Cupids holding a wreath over the Buddha (left:detail), Hadda, 3rd century. Musée Guimet.

These figures, also known as "apsarases" were extensively adopted in Buddhist art, especially throughout East Asia, in forms derivative to the Greco-Buddhist representation. The progressive evolution of the style can be seen in the art of Qizil and Dunhuang. It is unclear however if the concept of the flying cupids was brought to India from the West, of if it had an independent Indian origin, although Boardman considers it a Classical contribution: "Another Classical motif we found in India is the pair of hovering winged figures, generally called apsaras." (Boardman)

Scenes of cupids holding rich garlands, sometimes adorned with fruits, is another very popular Gandharan motif, directly inspired from Greek art. It is sometimes argued that the only concession to Indian art appears in the anklets worn by the cupids. These scenes had a very broad influence, as far as Amaravati on the eastern coast of India, where the cupids are replaced by yakṣas.

=== Devotees ===
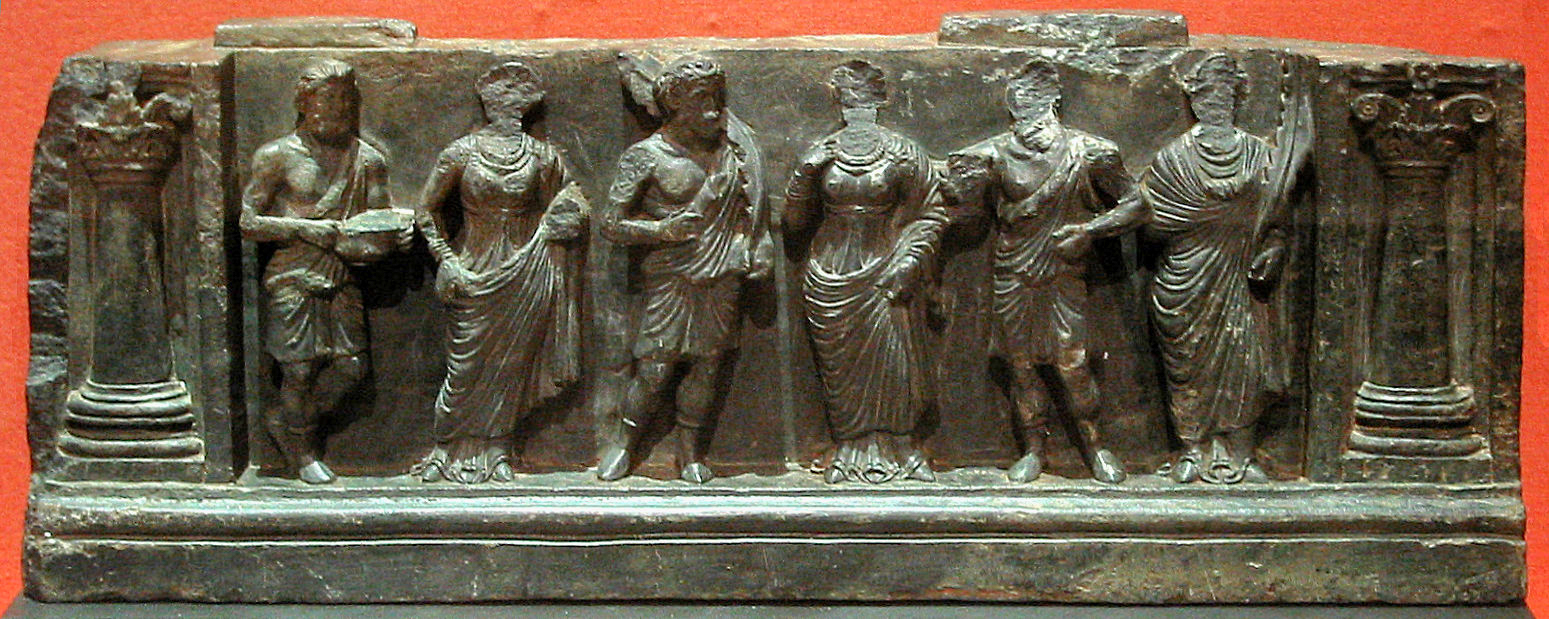
Gandhara frieze with devotees, holding plantain leaves, in purely Hellenistic style, inside Corinthian columns, 1st-2nd century AD. Buner, Swat, Pakistan. Victoria and Albert Museum.

Some Greco-Buddhist friezes represent groups of donors or devotees, giving interesting insights into the cultural identity of those who participated in the Buddhist cult.

Some groups, often described as the "Buner reliefs," usually dated to the 1st century AD, depict Greeks in perfect Hellenistic style, either in posture, rendering, or clothing (wearing the Greek chiton and himation). It is sometimes even difficult to perceive an actual religious message behind the scenes. (The devotee scene on the right might, with doubt, depict of the presentation of Prince Siddharta to his bride. It may also just be a festive scene.)

About a century later, friezes also depict Kushan devotees, usually with the Buddha as the central figure.

=== Fantastic animals ===
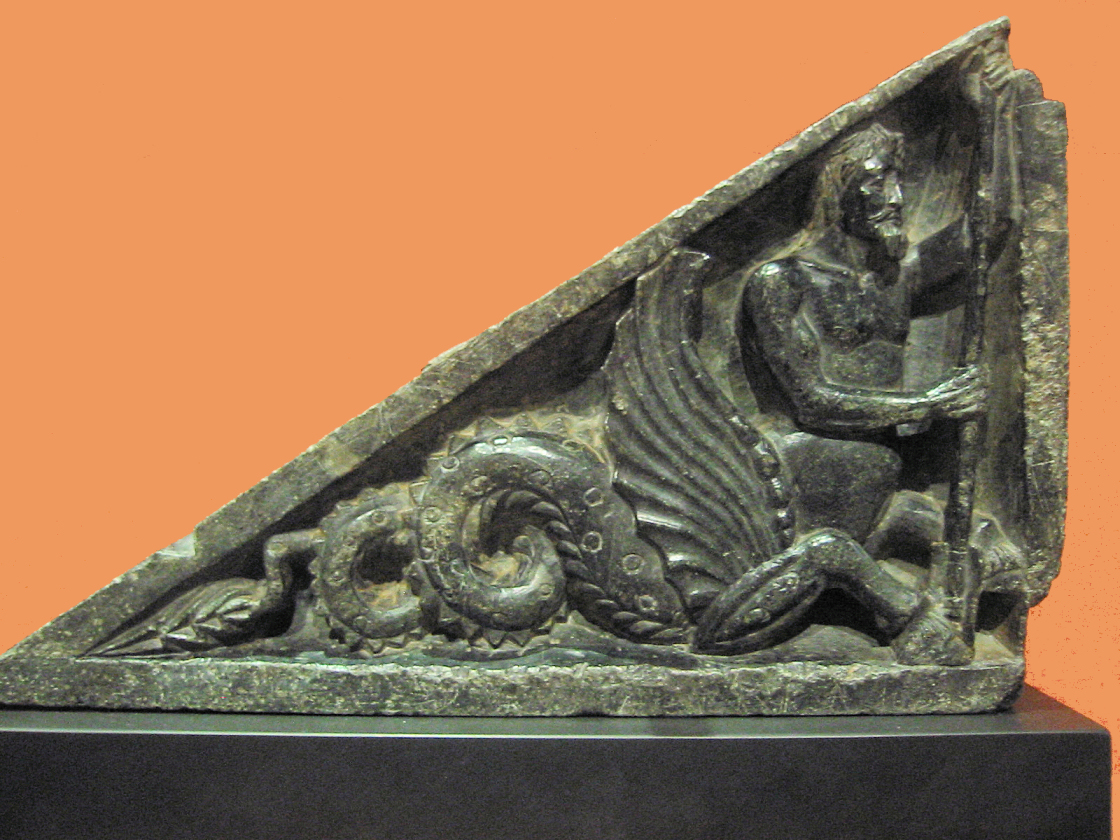
An Ichthyo-Centaur, 2nd century Gandhara, Victoria and Albert Museum.

Various fantastic animal deities of Hellenic origin were used as decorative elements in Buddhist temples, often triangular friezes in staircases or in front of Buddhist altars. The origin of these motifs can be found in Greece in the 5th century BC, and later in the designs of Greco-Bactrian perfume trays as those discovered in Sirkap. Among the most popular fantastic animals are tritons, ichthyo-centaurs and ketos sea-monsters. Similar fantastic animals are found in ancient Egyptian reliefs, and might therefore have been passed on to Bactria and India independently.

As fantastic animals of the sea, they were, in early Buddhism, supposed to safely bring the souls of dead people to Paradise beyond the waters. These motifs were later adopted in Indian art, where they influenced the depiction of the Indian monster makara, Varuna's mount.

== Kushan contribution ==
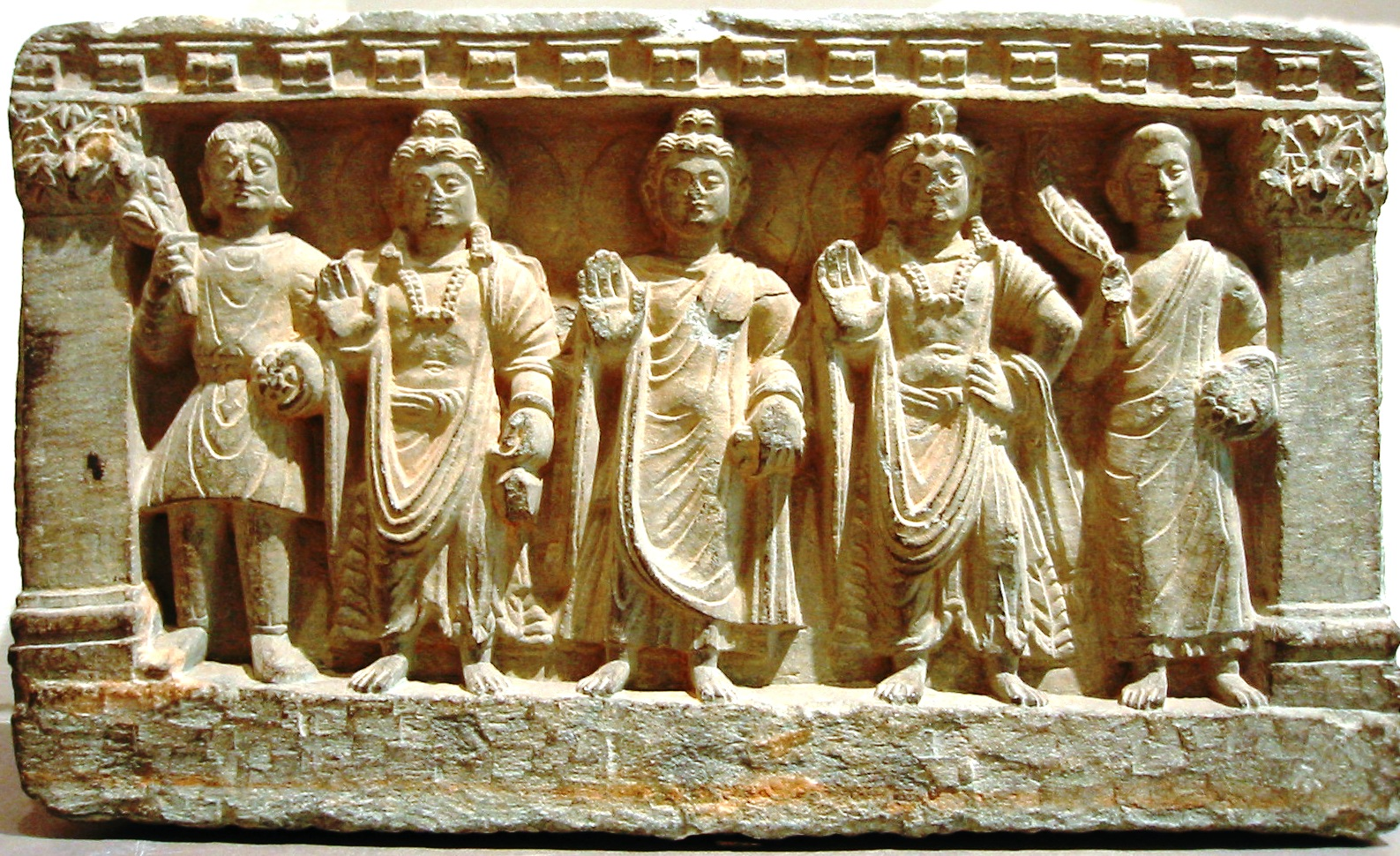
An early Mahayana Buddhist triad. From left to right, a Kushan devotee, the Bodhisattva Maitreya, the Buddha, the Bodhisattva Avalokitesvara, and a Buddhist monk. 2nd-3rd century AD, Gandhara.

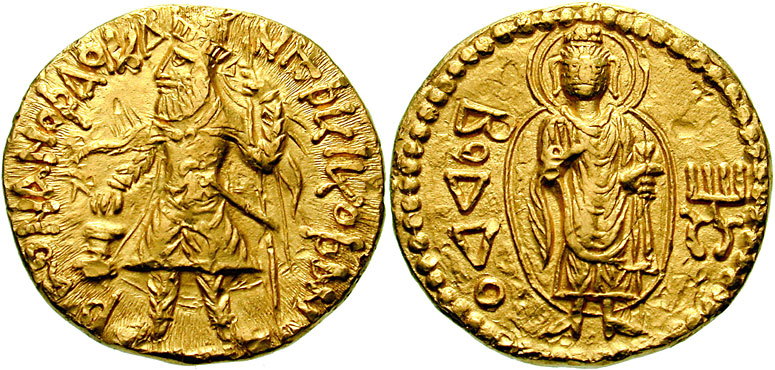
A Buddhist coin of Kanishka I, with "Boddo" (=Buddha) in Greek script.

The later part of Greco-Buddhist art in northwestern India is usually associated with the Kushan Empire. The Kushans were nomadic people who started migrating from the Tarim Basin in Central Asia from around 170 BC and ended up founding an empire in northwestern India from the 2nd century BC. After conquering the lands once inhabited by Greco-Bactrians and Indo-Greeks, the Kushan Empire adopted Greco-Buddhist art.

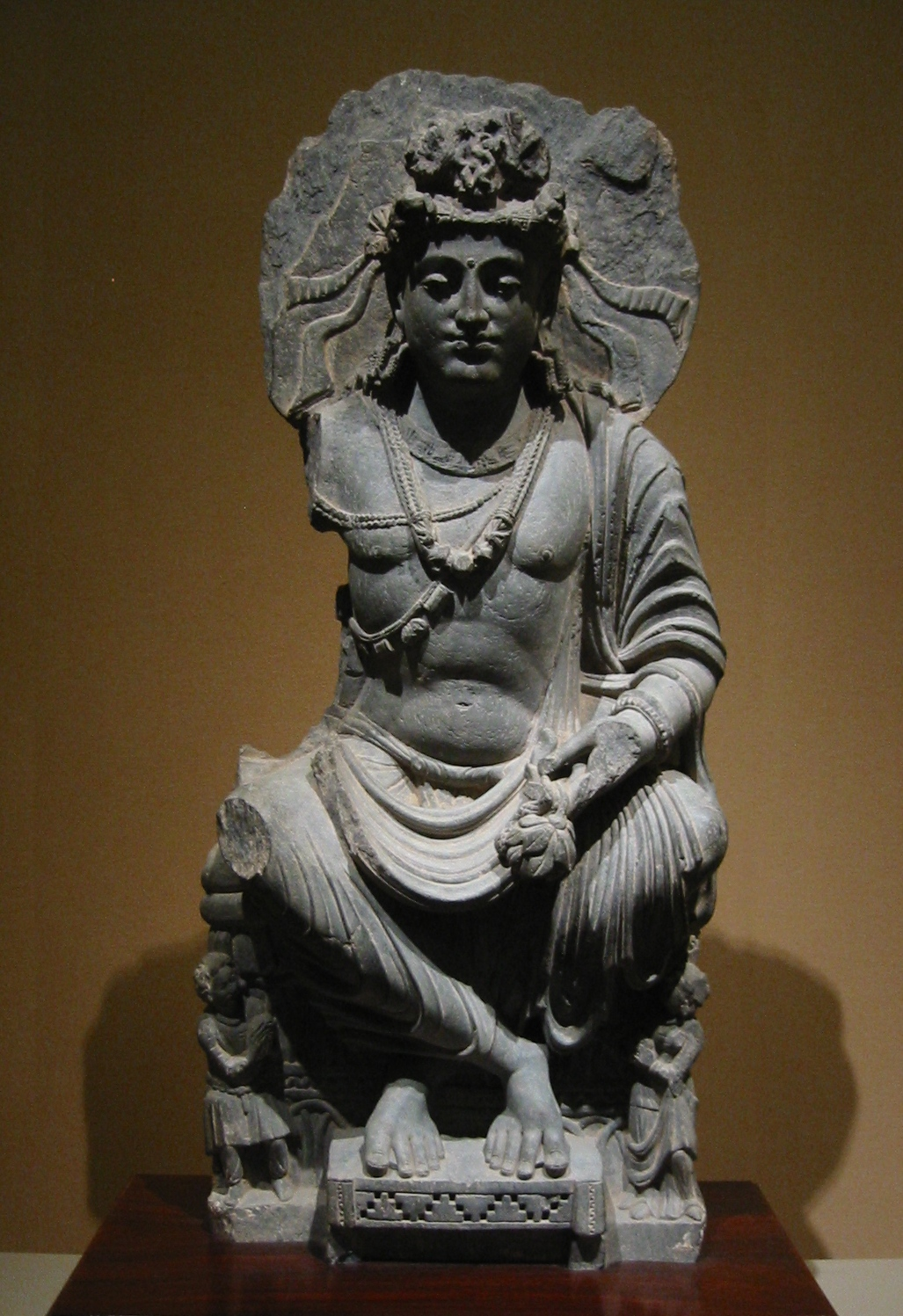
Maitreya, with Kushan devotee couple. 2nd century Gandhara.

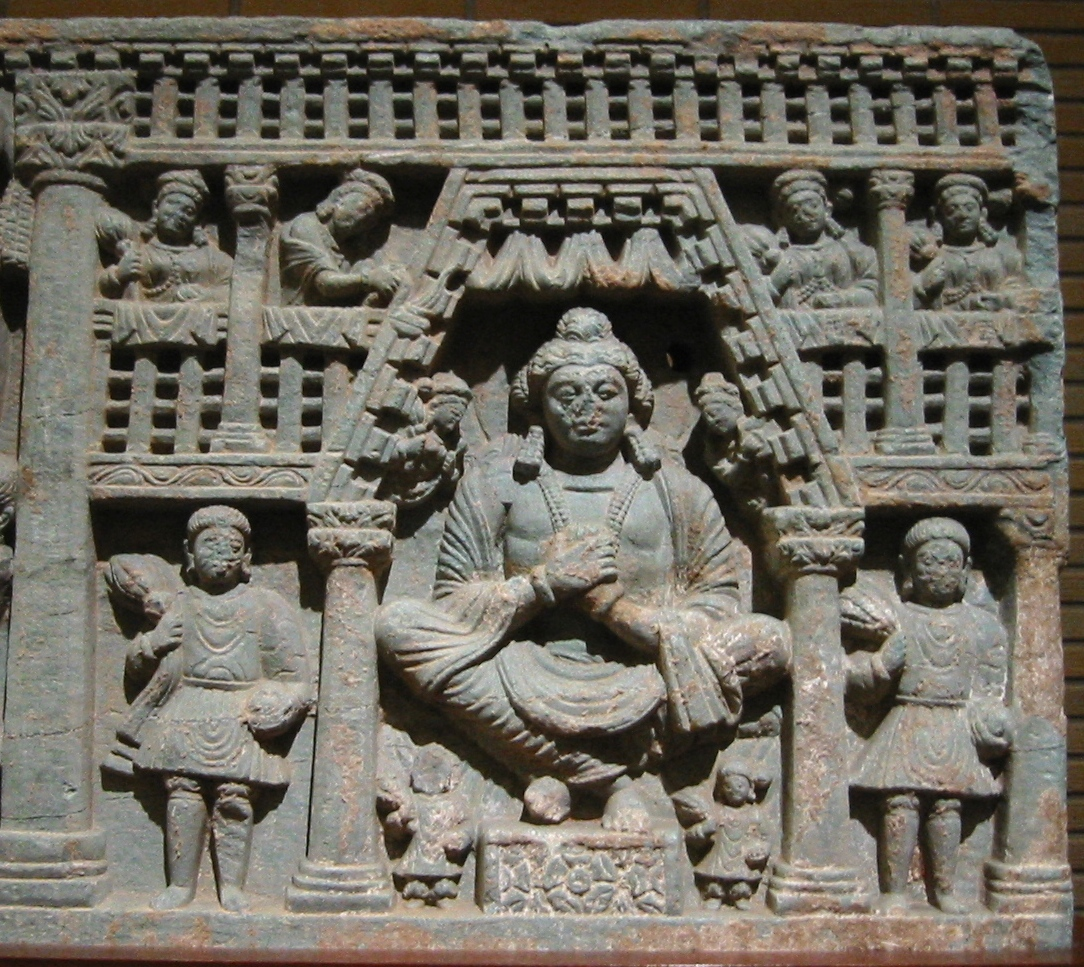
Maitreya, with Kushan devotees, left and right. 2nd century Gandhara.

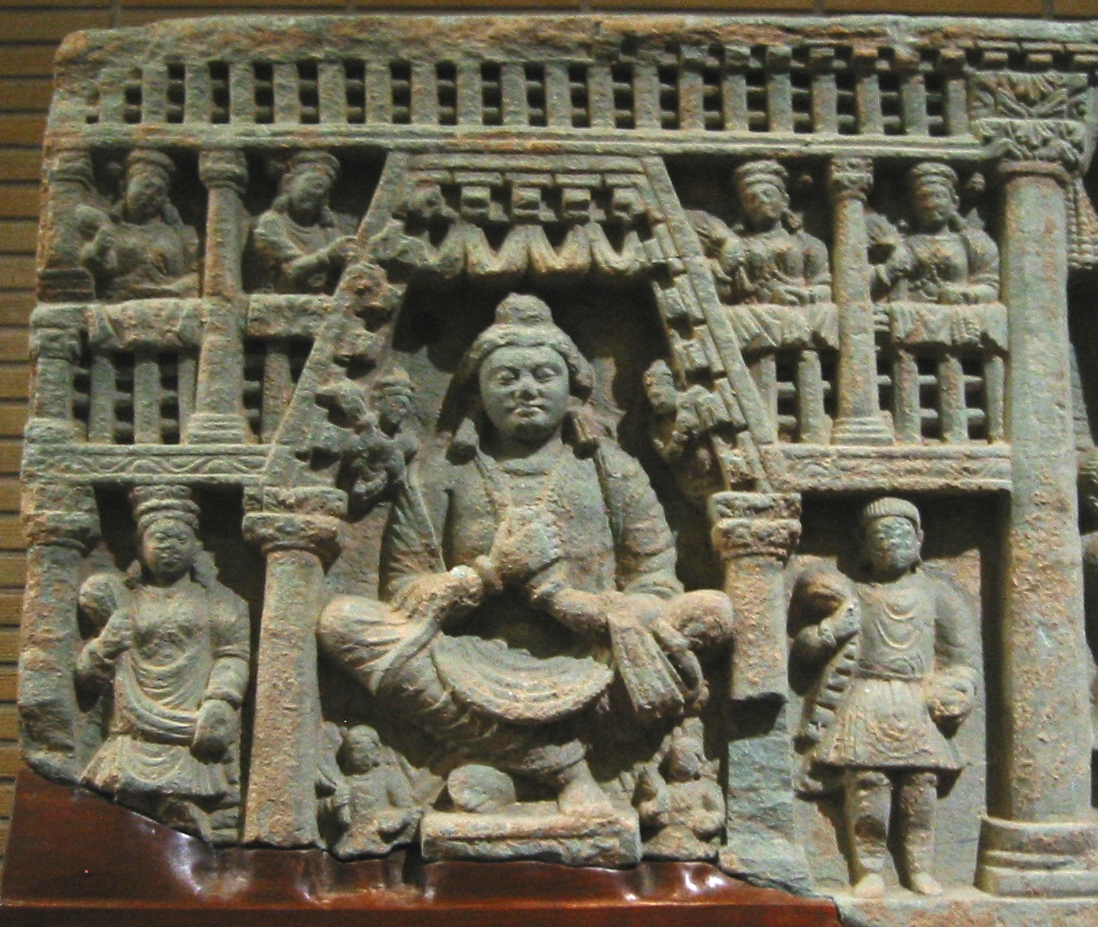
Maitreya, with Indian (left) and Kushan (right) devotees.

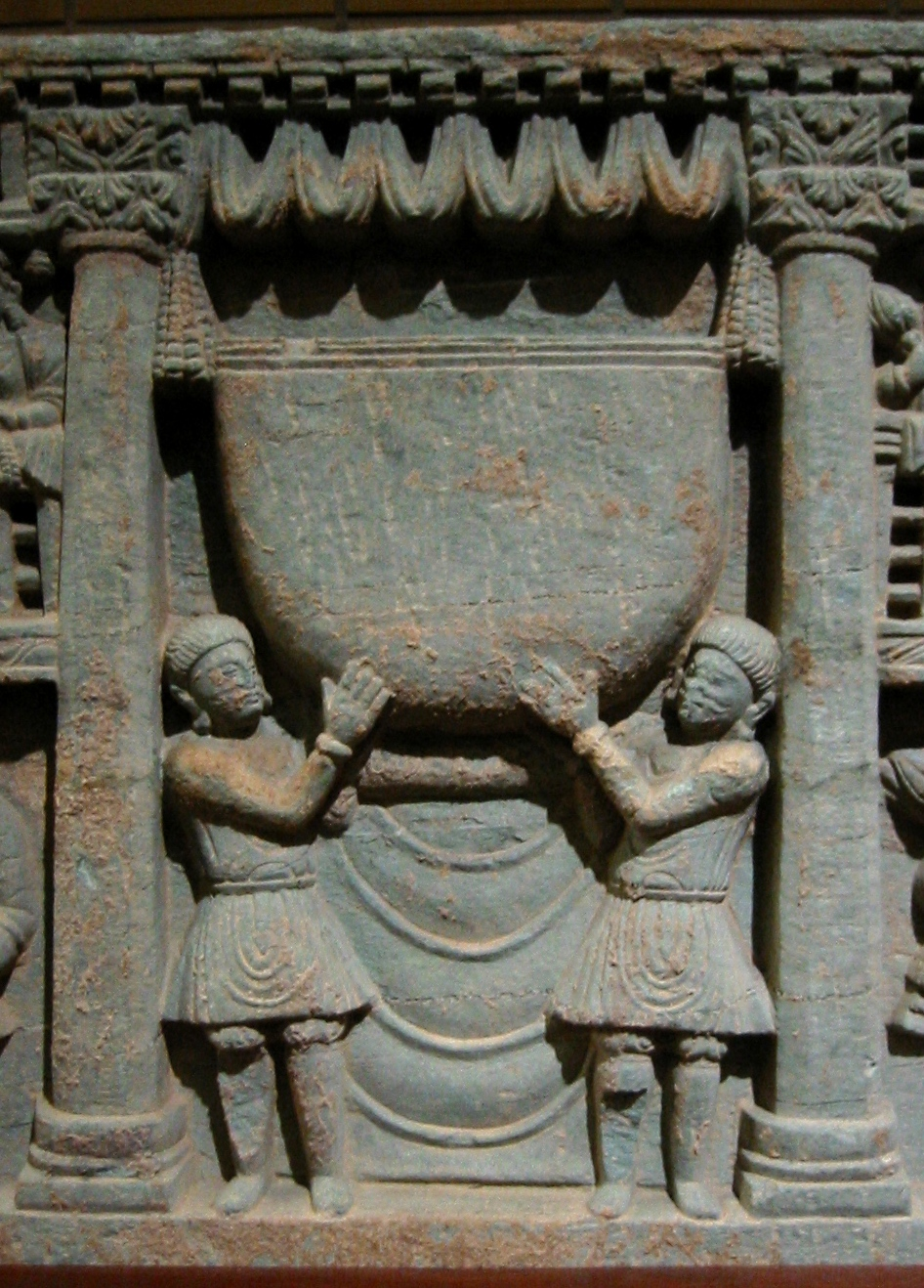
Kushans worshipping the Buddha's bowl. 2nd century Gandhara.

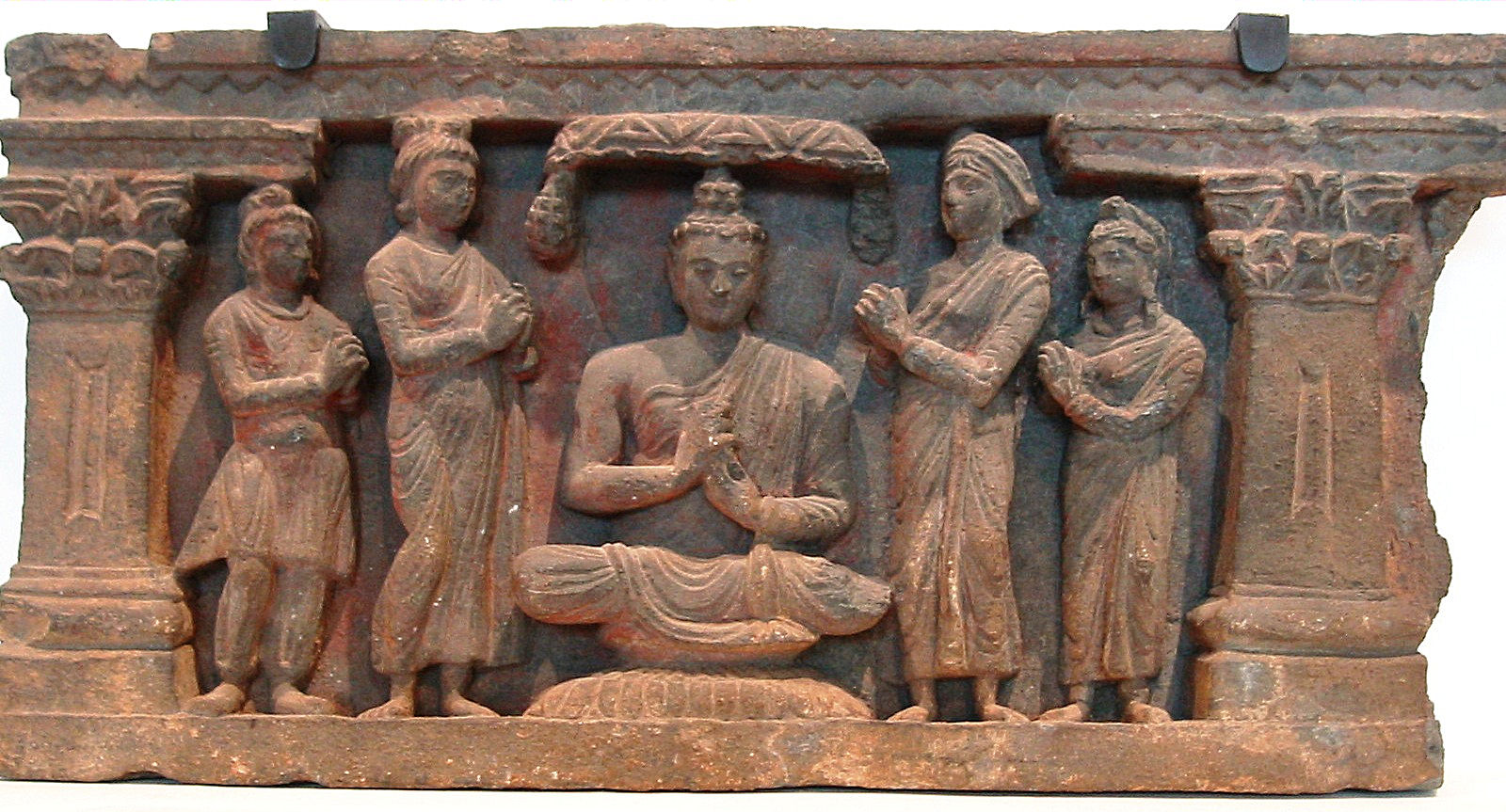
Kushan devotee couple, around the Buddha, Brahma and Indra.

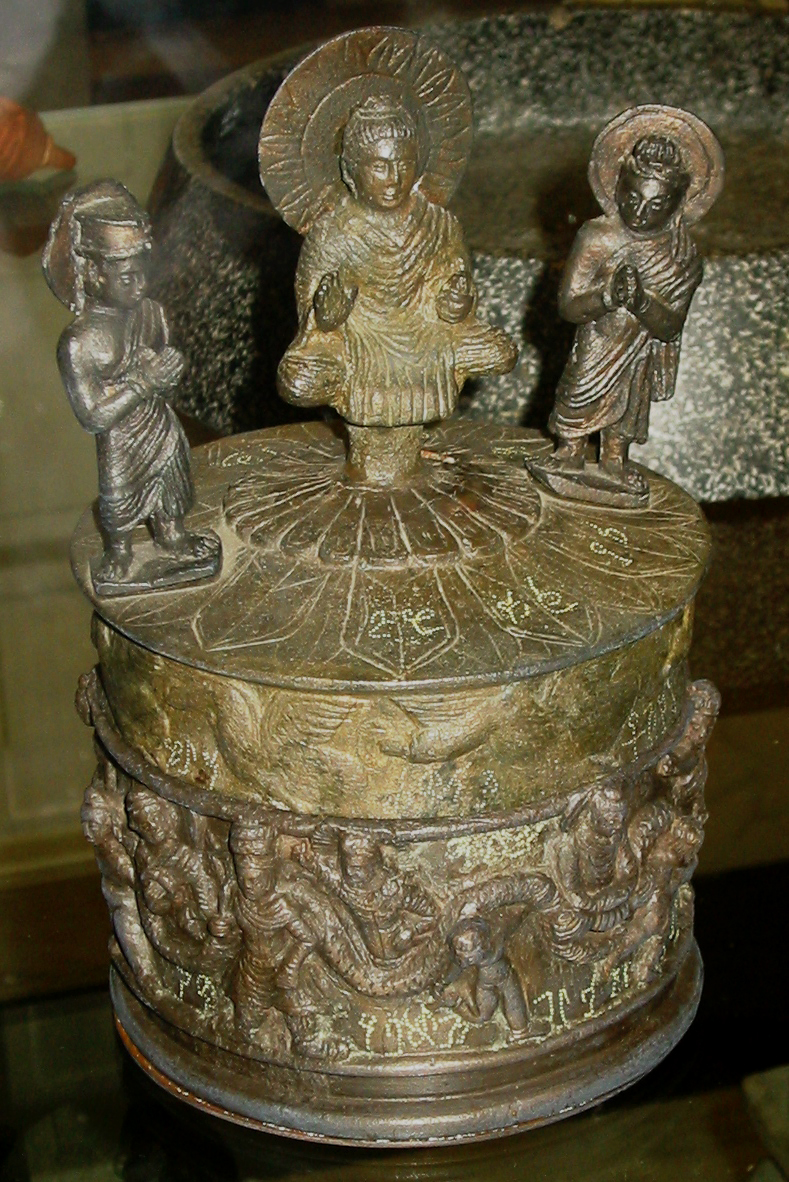
The "Kanishka casket," with the Buddha surrounded by Brahma and Indra, and a Kushan Royal on the lower part, dates ranging from the 1st century to 4th century AD .

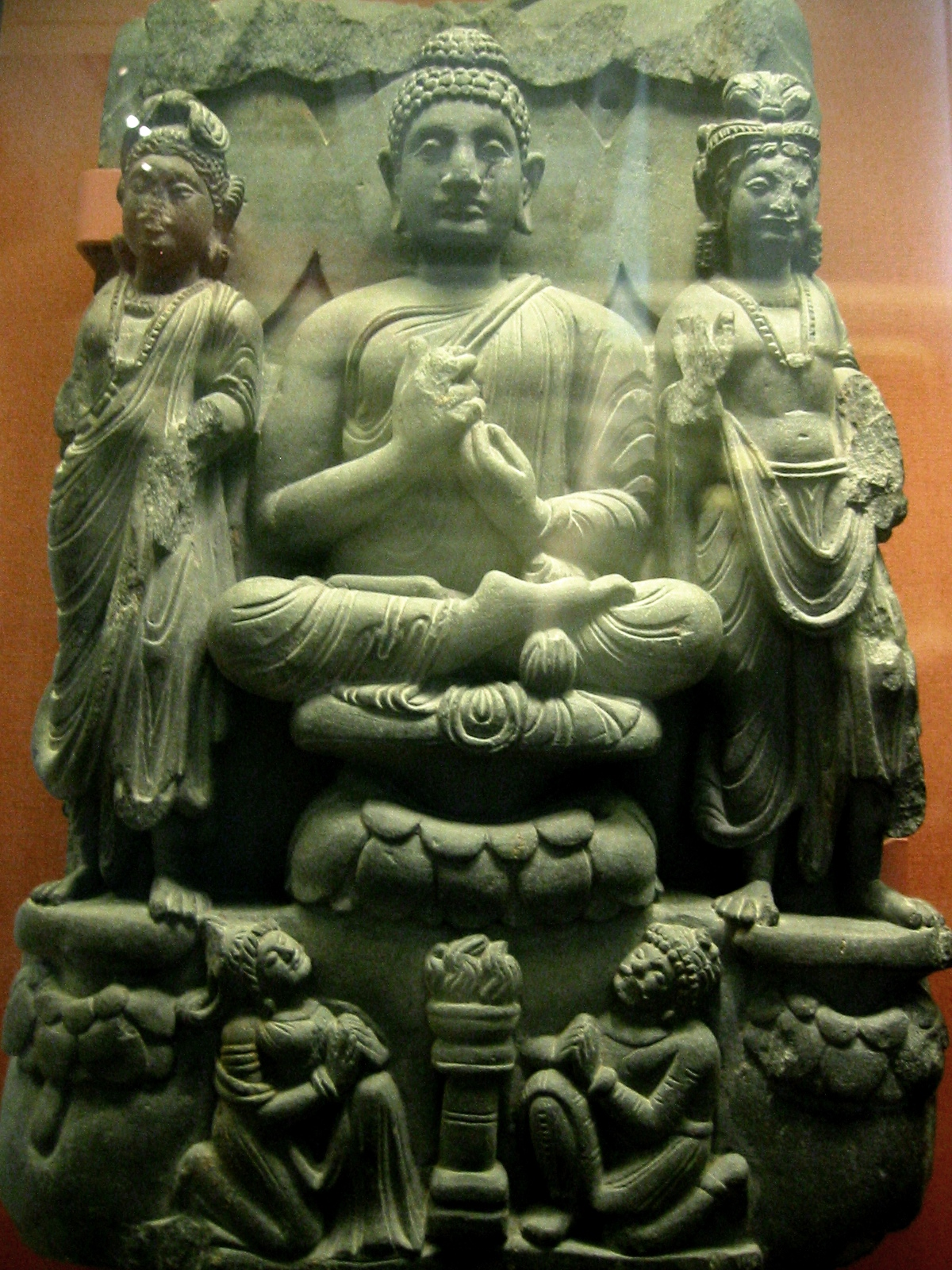
Buddha triad and kneeling Kushan devotee couple. 3rd century.

== Later period (5th-7th centuries) ==
The Greco-Buddhist art of Gandhara essentially ends with the 5th-7th centuries. A late evolution is the appearance of a halo and mandorla surrounding the Buddha figure. The last stages correspond roughly to the destruction of the Alchon Huns, when the art of Gandhara, becomes essentially extinct. When Xuanzang visited northwestern India in c. 630 AD, he reported that Buddhism had drastically declined, and that most of the monasteries were deserted and left in ruins.

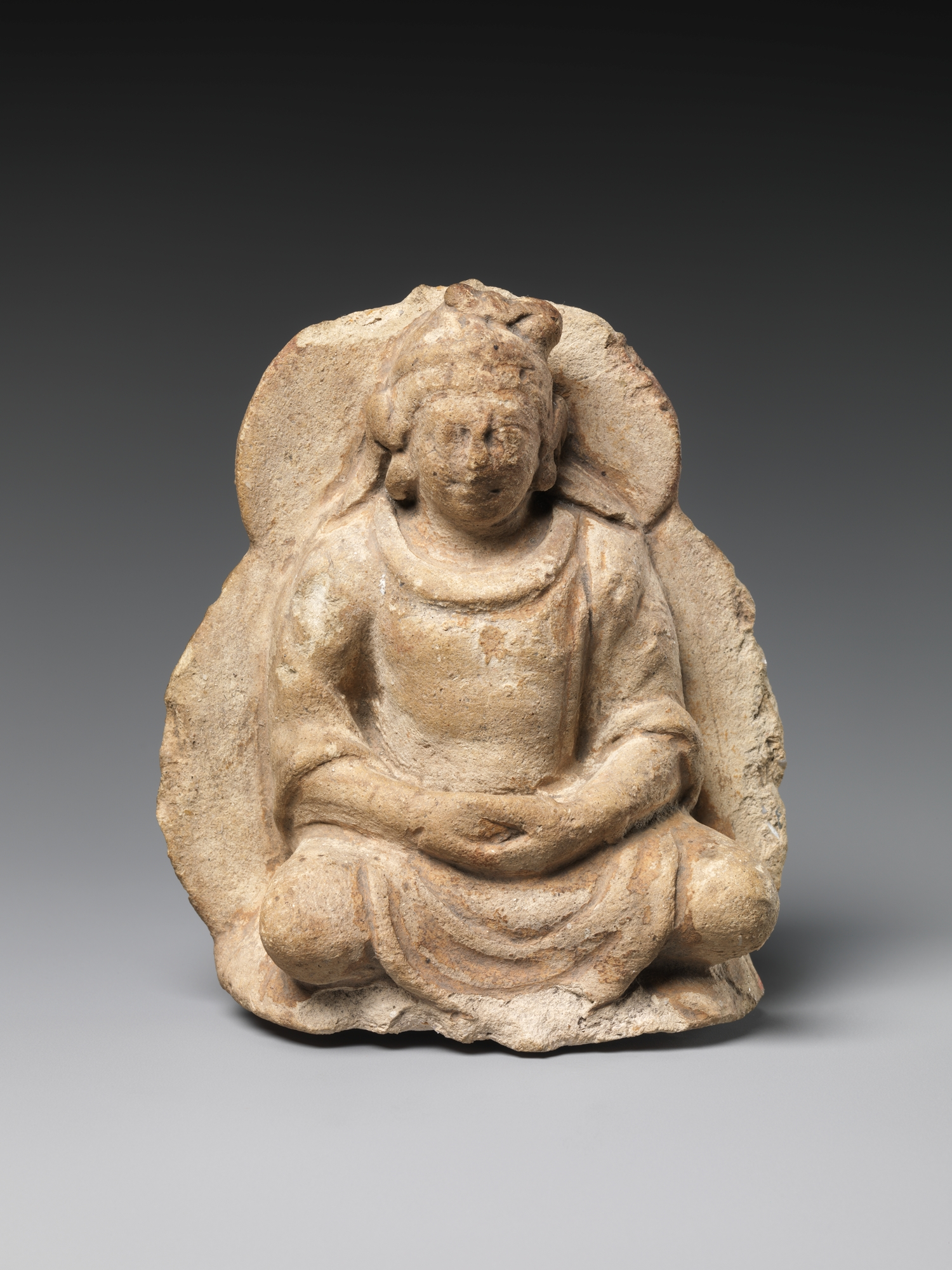
Seated Buddha with halo and mandorla 5th-6th century Gandhara.

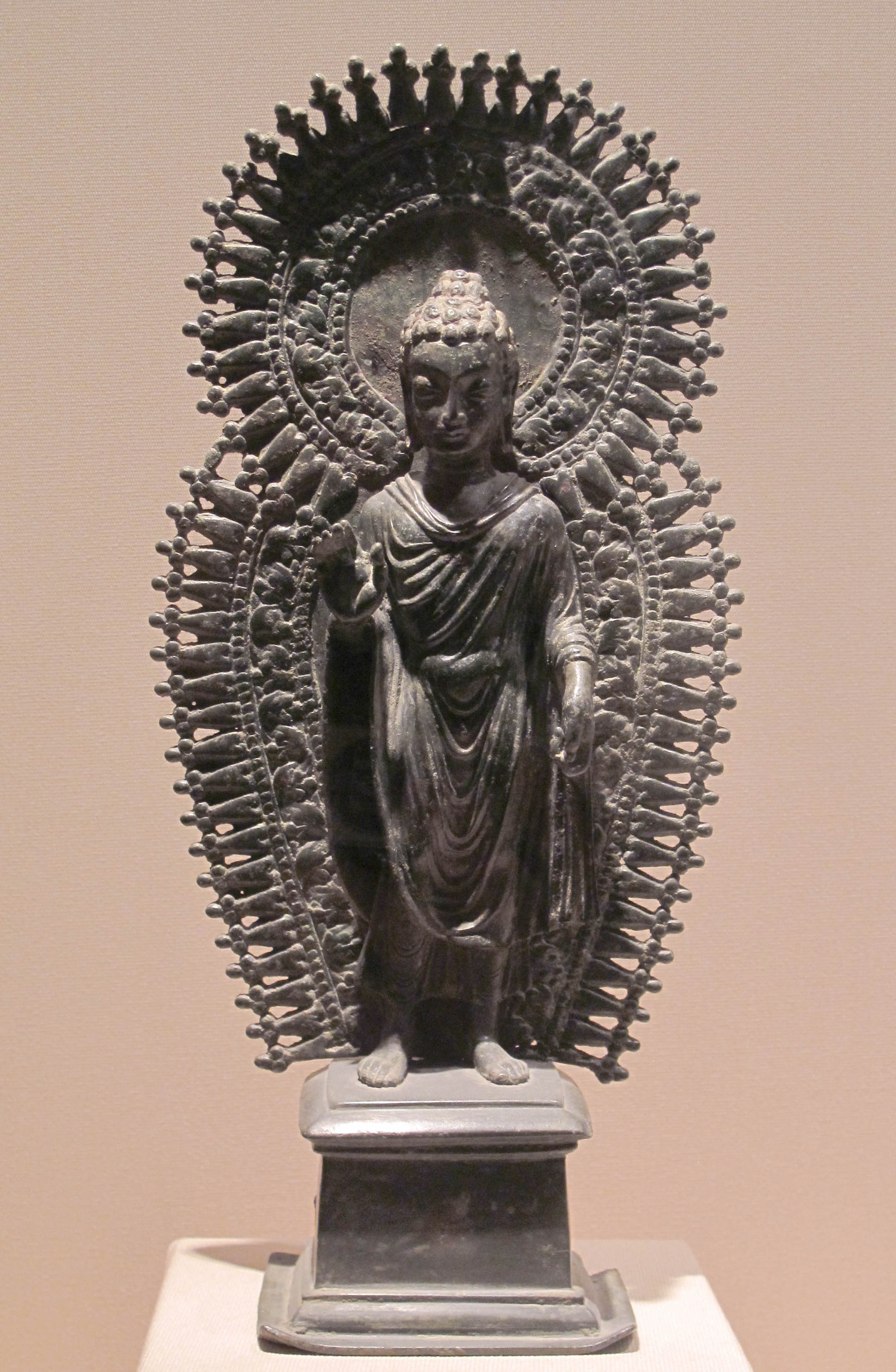
The Buddha with a radiate mandorla, Gandhara, 6th century

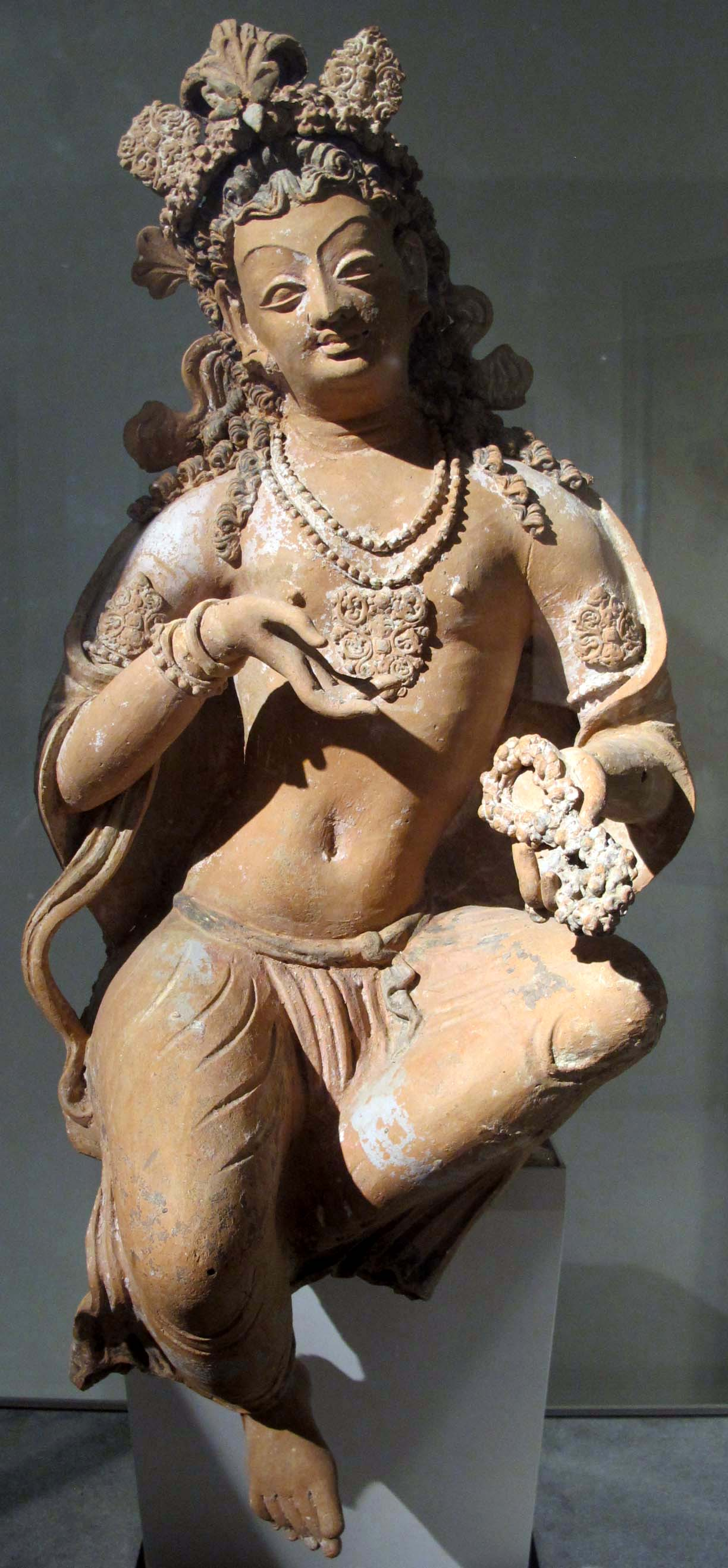
Last stages of Greco-Buddhist art. 7th century, Ghorband District, Afghanistan.

== Southern influences ==
=== Art of the Shunga ===
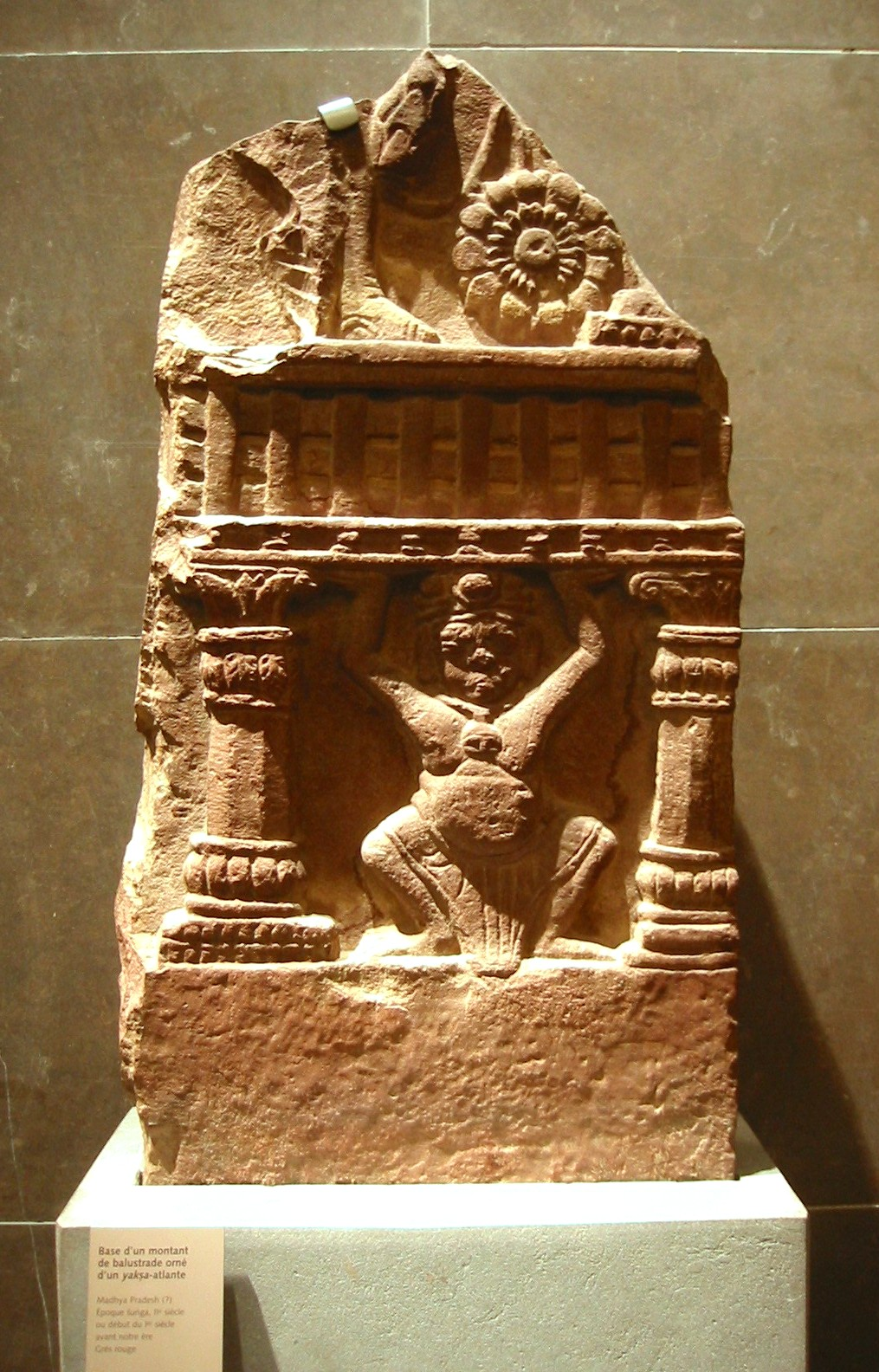
Balustrade-holding Yaksa with Corinthian columns, Madhya Pradesh (?), Shunga period (2nd-1st century BC). Musee Guimet.

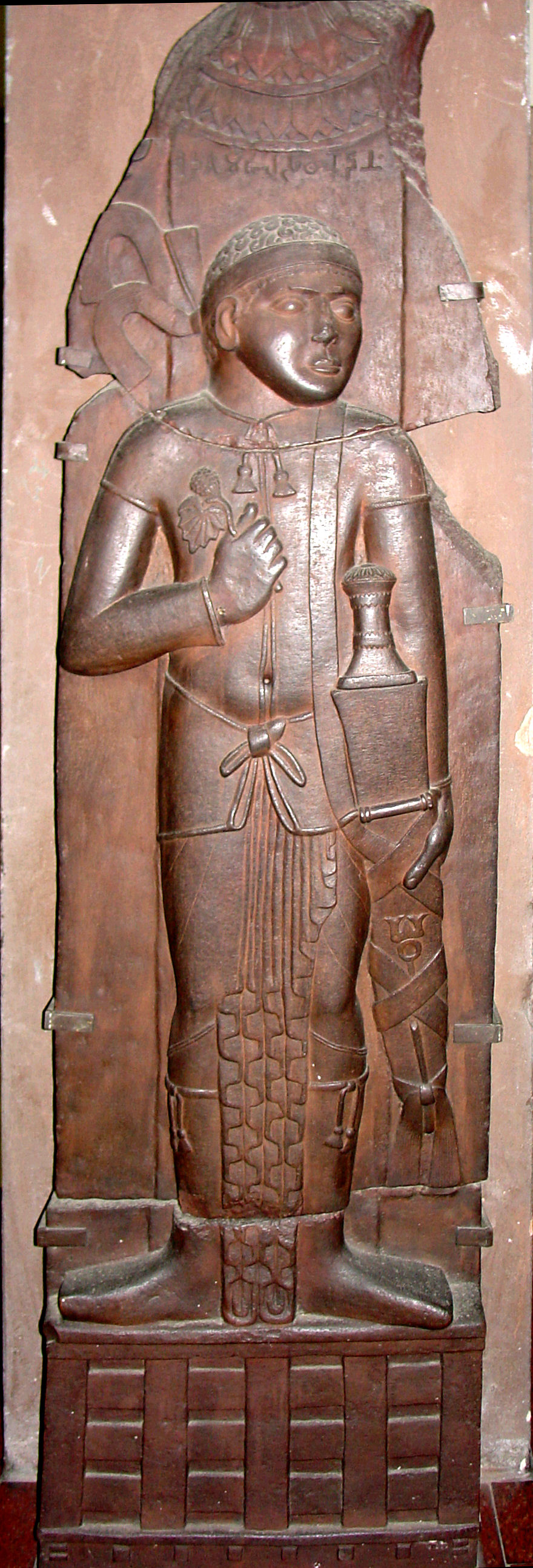
Indian relief of probable Indo-Greek king, with Buddhist triratana symbol on his sword. Bharhut, 2nd century BC. Indian Museum, Calcutta.

Examples of the influence of Hellenistic or Greco-Buddhist art on the art of the Shunga Empire (183-73 BC) are usually faint. The main religion, at least at the beginning, seems to have been Hinduism, although some late Buddhist realizations in Madhya Pradesh as also known, such as some architectural expansions that were done at the stupas of Sanchi and Bharhut, originally started under King Ashoka.

=== Art of Mathura ===
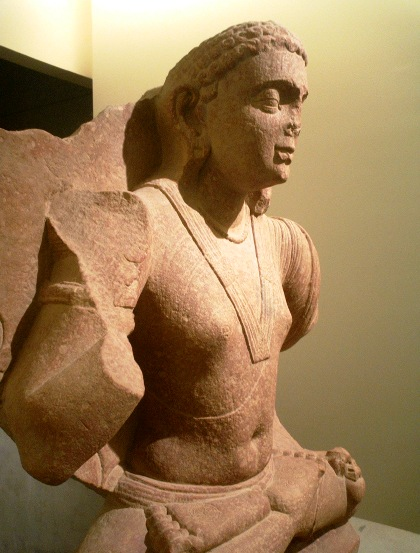
The Bodhisattva Maitreya, 2nd century, Mathura, 2nd-century AD.

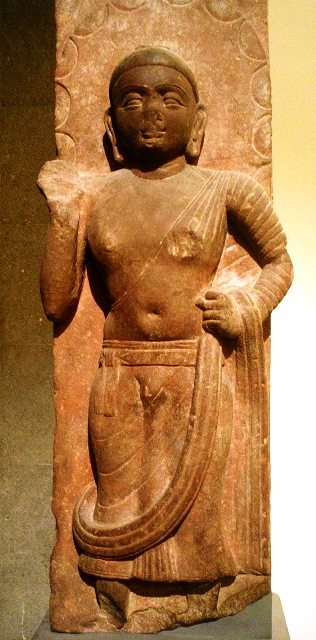
A Bodhisattva, 2nd century, Mathura

The representations of the Buddha in Mathura, in central northern India, are generally dated slightly later than those of Gandhara, although not without debate, and are also much less numerous. Up to that point, Indian Buddhist art had essentially been aniconic, avoiding representation of the Buddha, except for his symbols, such as the wheel or the Bodhi tree, although some archaic Mathuran sculptural representation of Yaksas (earth divinities) have been dated to the 1st century BC. Even these Yaksas indicate some Hellenistic influence, possibly dating back to the occupation of Mathura by the Indo-Greeks during the 2nd century BC.

In terms of artistic predispositions for the first representations of the Buddha, Greek art provided a very natural and centuries-old background for an anthropomorphic representation of a divinity, while on the contrary "there was nothing in earlier Indian statuary to suggest such a treatment of form or dress, and the Hindu pantheon provided no adequate model for an aristocratic and wholly human deity" (Boardman).

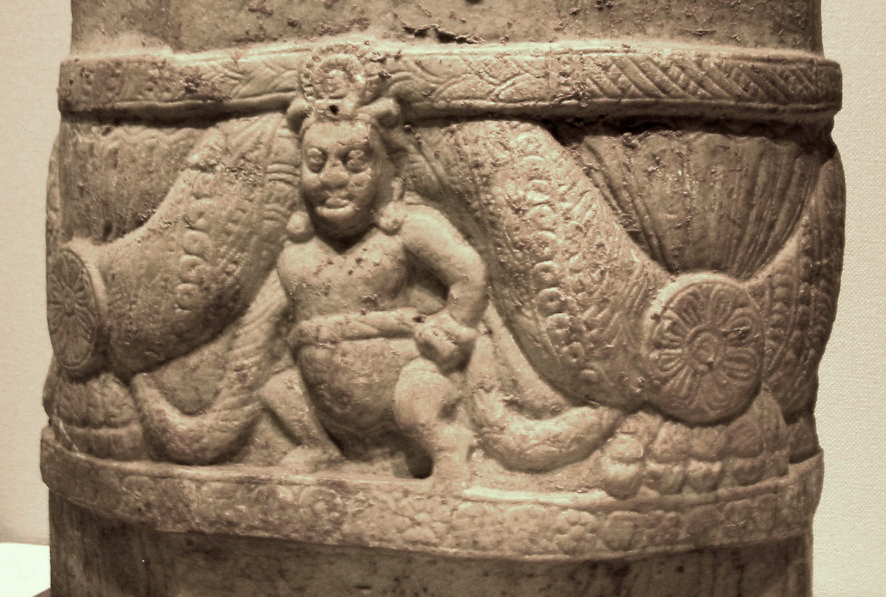
Greek scroll supported by Indian Yaksas, Amaravati, 3rd century AD

The Mathura sculptures incorporate some Hellenistic elements, such as the general idealistic realism, and key design elements such as the curly hair, and folded garment. Specific Mathuran adaptations tend to reflect warmer climatic conditions, as they consist in a higher fluidity of the clothing, which progressively tend to cover only one shoulder instead of both. Also, facial types also tend to become more Indianized. Banerjee in Hellenism in ancient India describes "the mixed character of the Mathura School in which we find on the one hand, a direct continuation of the old Indian art of Bharhut and Sanchi and on the other hand, the classical influence derived from Gandhara".

The influence of Greek art can be felt beyond Mathura, as far as Amaravati on the East coast of India, as shown by the usage of Greek scrolls in combination with Indian deities. Other motifs such as Greek chariots pulled by four horses can also be found in the same area.

Incidentally, Hindu art started to develop from the 1st to the 2nd century AD and found its first inspiration in the Buddhist art of Mathura. It progressively incorporated a profusion of original Hindu stylistic and symbolic elements however, in contrast with the general balance and simplicity of Buddhist art.

The art of Mathura features frequent sexual imagery. Female images with bare breasts, nude below the waist, displaying labia and female genitalia are common. These images are more sexually explicit than those of earlier or later periods.

=== Arts of Western India ===
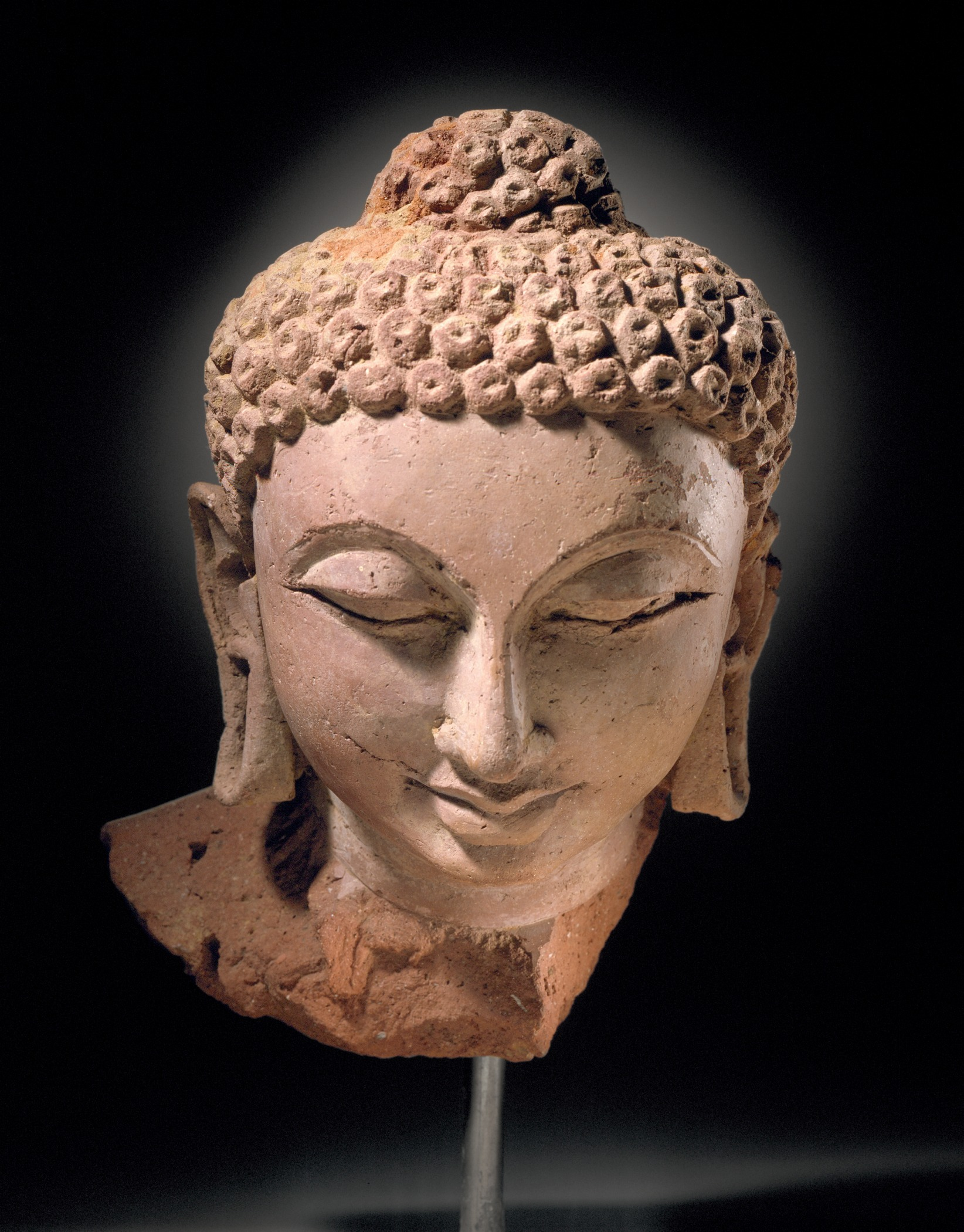
A terracotta head of Buddha Shakyamuni, inspired by Greco-Buddhist art, Devnimori, Gujarat (375-400 AD).

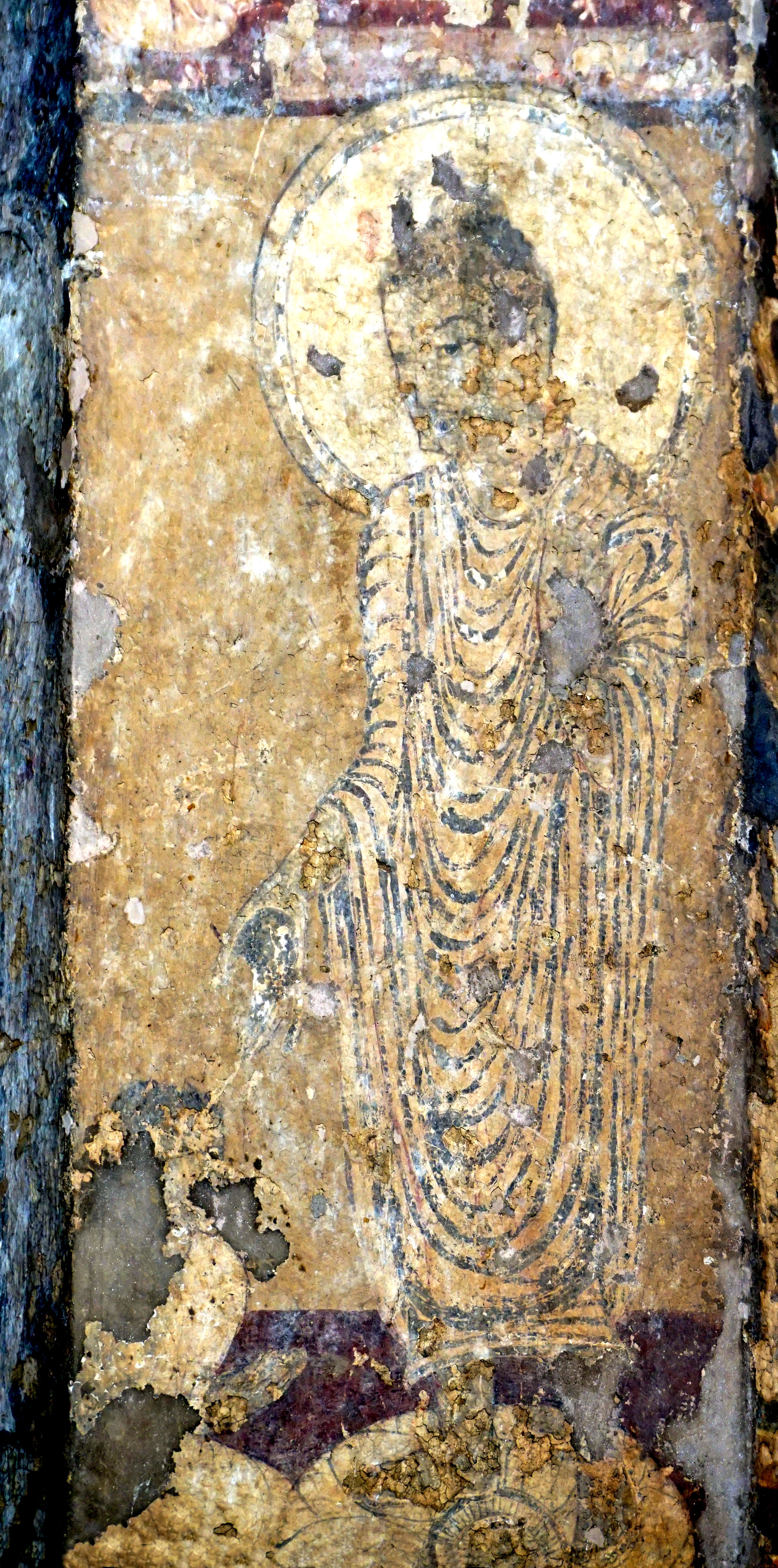
The Buddha in long, heavy robe, a design derived from the art of Gandhara, Ajanta Caves, 5th century AD.

It has been suggested that the art of Devnimori in Gujarat, dated to the 4th century AD, represented a Western Indian artistic tradition, based on the influence of the Greco-Buddhist art of Gandhara, that was anterior to the rise of Gupta Empire art, and that it may have influenced it, and have influenced the art of the Ajanta Caves, Sarnath and other places from the 5th century onward. Devnimori may also have received some influence from Mathura art. At Ajanta, some connections with the art of Gandhara can be noted, and there is evidence of a shared artistic idiom.

The site of Devnimori included numerous terracotta Buddhist sculptures (but no stone sculptures), which are among the earliest sculptures that can be found in Gujarat. The style is clearly influenced by the Greco-Buddhist art of Gandhara.

The Indo-Scythian Western Satraps (1st century AD-405 AD may have played a role in the transmission of the art of Gandhara to the western Deccan region, as may also have the southern expansion of the Alchon Huns in the 6th-7th century.

=== Art of the Gupta ===
The art of Mathura acquired progressively more Indian elements and reached a very high sophistication during the Gupta Empire, between the 4th and the 6th century AD. The art of the Gupta is considered as the final pinnacle of Indian art reflecting Hindu, Buddhist and Jain iconography.

Hellenistic elements are still clearly visible in the purity of the statuary and the folds of the clothing, but are improved upon with a very delicate rendering of the draping and a sort of radiance reinforced by the usage of pink sandstone. Artistic details tend to be less realistic, as seen in the symbolic shell-like curls used to render the hairstyle of the Buddha.

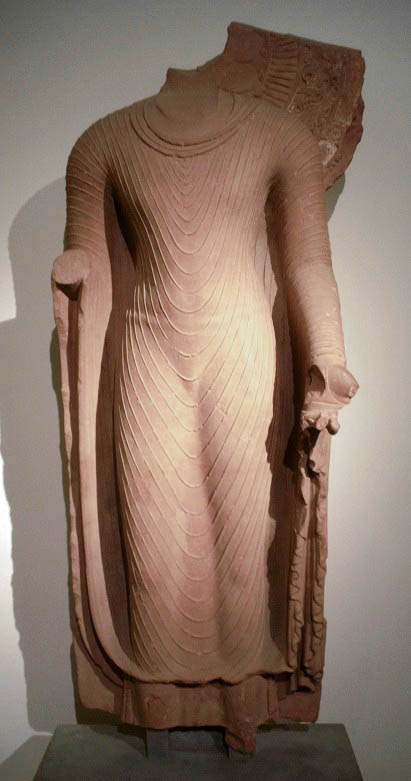
Buddha of the Gupta period, 5th century, Mathura.

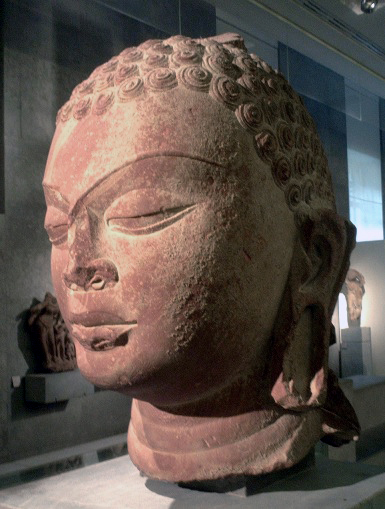
Head of a Buddha, Gupta period, 6th century.

== Expansion in Central Asia ==
Greco-Buddhist artistic influences naturally followed Buddhism in its expansion to Central and East Asia from the 1st century BC.

=== Bactria ===
Bactria was under direct Greek control for more than two centuries from the conquests of Alexander the Great in 332 BC to the end of the Greco-Bactrian kingdom around 125 BC. The art of Bactria was almost perfectly Hellenistic as shown by the archaeological remains of Greco-Bactrian cities such as Alexandria on the Oxus (Ai-Khanoum), or the numismatic art of the Greco-Bactrian kings, often considered as the best of the Hellenistic world, and including the largest silver and gold coins ever minted by the Greeks.

When Buddhism expanded in Central Asia from the 1st century AD, Bactria saw the results of the Greco-Buddhist syncretism arrive on its territory from India, and a new blend of sculptural representation remained until the Islamic invasions.

The most striking of these realizations are the Buddhas of Bamyan. They tend to vary between the 5th and the 9th century AD. Their style is strongly inspired by Hellenistic culture.

In another area of Bactria called Fondukistan, some Greco-Buddhist art survived until the 7th century in Buddhist monasteries, displaying a strong Hellenistic influence combined with Indian decorativeness and mannerism, and some influence by the Sasanid Persians.

Most of the remaining art of Bactria was destroyed from the 5th century onward: the Buddhists were often blamed for idolatry and tended to be persecuted by the iconoclastic Muslims. Destructions continued during the Afghanistan War, and especially by the Taliban regime in 2001. The most famous case is that of the destruction of the Buddhas of Bamyan. Ironically, most of the remaining art from Afghanistan still extant was removed from the country during the Colonial period. In particular, a rich collection exists at the Musee Guimet in France.

=== Tarim Basin ===
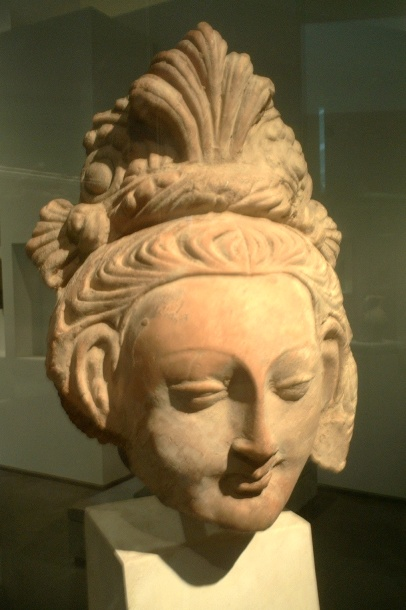
Head of a Bodhisattva, 6th-7th century terracotta, Tumshuq (Xinjiang).

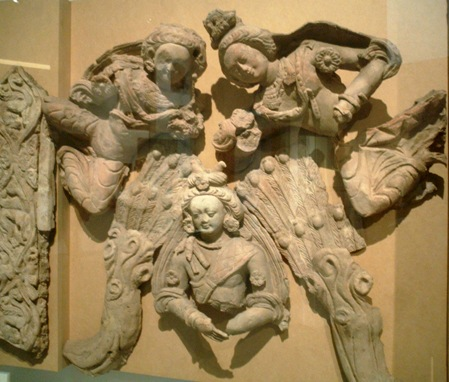
"Heroic gesture of the Bodhisattva", 6th-7th century terracotta, Tumshuq (Xinjiang).

The art of the Tarim Basin, also called Serindian art, is the art that developed from the 2nd through the 11th century in Serindia or Xinjiang, the western region of China that forms part of Central Asia. It derives from the art of the Gandhara and clearly combines Indian traditions with Greek and Roman influences. Buddhist missionaries travelling on the Silk Road introduced this art, along with Buddhism itself, into Serindia, where it mixed with Chinese and Persian influences.

== Influences in East Asia ==
The arts of China, Korea and Japan adopted Greco-Buddhist influences, but also added many local elements as well. What remains identifiable from Greco-Buddhist art are realism in sculpture, clothing with elaborate folds, curly hairstyles, and winged figures holding wreaths.

=== China ===
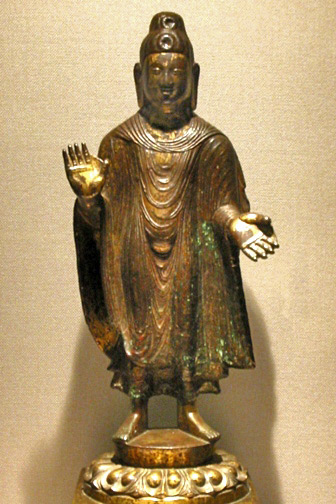
Buddha Maitreya, Northern Wei dynasty, AD 443

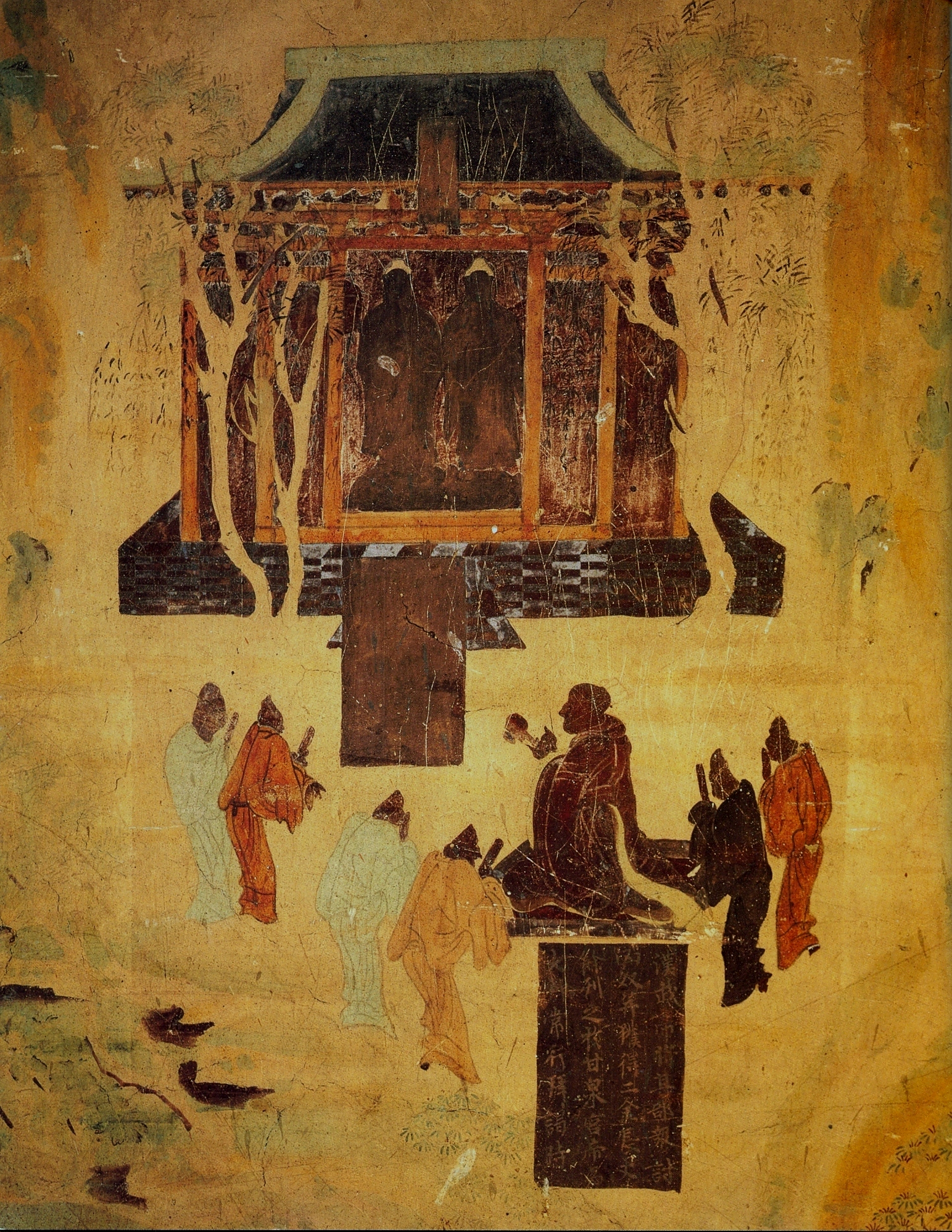
Fresco describing Emperor Wu (156–87 BC) worshipping two statues of the Buddha, Mogao Caves, Dunhuang, c. 8th century AD

Greco-Buddhist influences are found in Chinese Buddhist art, with local and temporal variations depending on the dynasties that adopted Buddhism. Money tree artifacts from the Han dynasty often contain small depictions of the Buddha similar to Gandhara styles, such as the high ushnisha, vertical hair bun, moustache, and symmetrical depictions of the robe and folds of the arms.

Some Northern Wei and Northern Qi statues are reminiscent of Gandharan style standing Buddhas, although in a more symbolic style. Some Eastern Wei statues display Buddhas with elaborate Greek-style robe folds, and surmounted by flying figures holding a wreath.

=== Japan ===
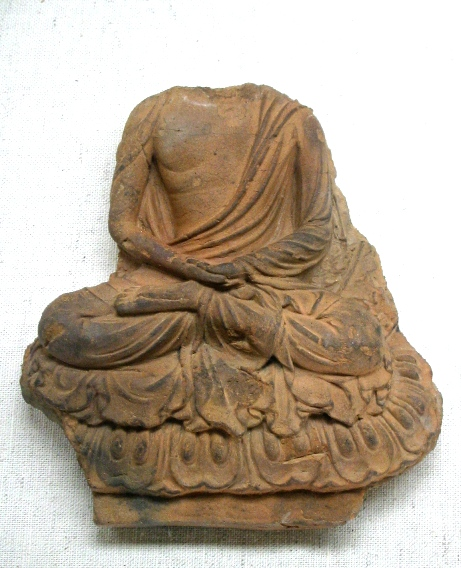
Buddha figure, Japan, Asuka period, 7th century

In Japan, Buddhist art developed as the country converted to Buddhism in AD 548. After the adoption of Buddhism, items of the Asuka Period display a classical style, with Hellenistic dress and realism characteristic of Greco-Buddhist art. Other art incorporated Chinese and Korean influences, so that Japanese Buddhism became varied in its expression. Elements of Greco-Buddhist art remain to this day, such as depictions of the Buddha with Greek style clothing folds.

Greek influence is also found in depictions of the wind god Fūjin, which shows similarities with the god Boreas. Both hold a "wind bag" above their head in a similar pose.

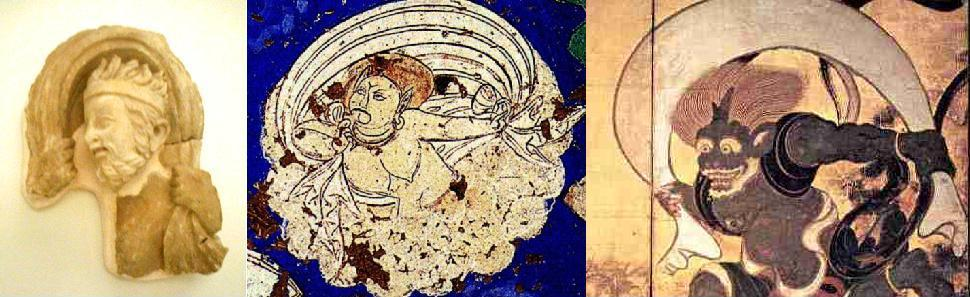
Iconographical evolution of the Wind God. Left: Greek wind god from Hadda, 2nd century. Middle: wind god from Kizil, Tarim Basin, 7th century. Right: Japanese wind god Fujin, 17th century.

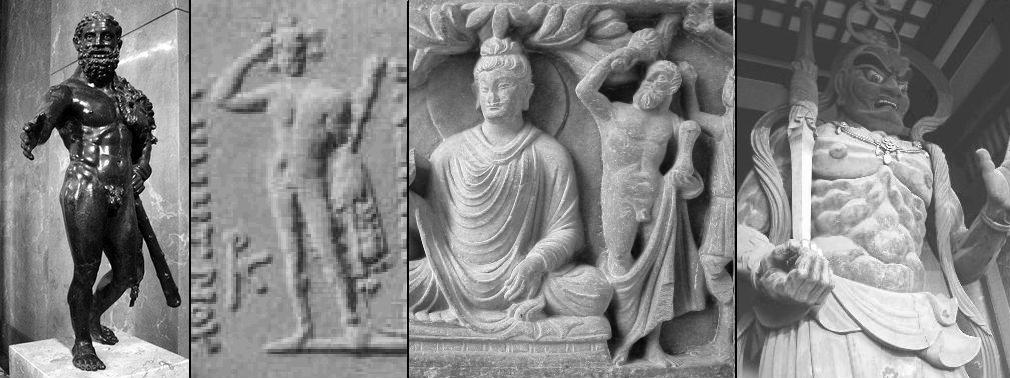
Iconographical evolution from the Greek god Herakles to Nio temple guardians. From left to right: 1) Herakles (Louvre Museum). 2) Herakles on coin of Greco-Bactrian king Demetrius I. 3) Vajrapani, the protector of the Buddha, depicted as Herakles in Gandhara. 4) Nio gate guardian, manifestation of Vajrapani

== Influences on Southeast Asian art ==
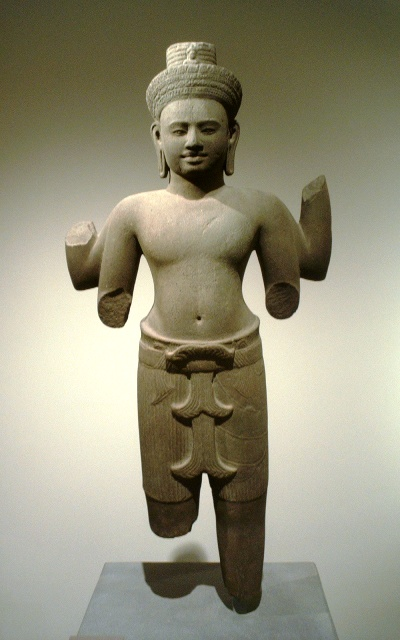
Bodhisattva Lokesvara, Cambodia 12th century.

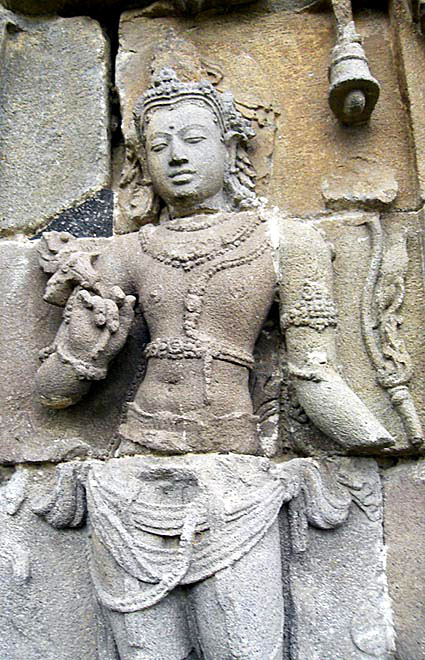
Avalokiteshvara on the wall of Plaosan temple (Indonesia), Javanese Sailendran art, 9th century.

The Indian civilization proved very influential on the cultures of Southeast Asia. Most countries adopted Indian writing and culture, together with Hinduism and Mahayana and Theravada Buddhism.

The influence of Greco-Buddhist art is still visible in most of the representation of the Buddha in Southeast Asia, through their idealism, realism and details of dress, although they tend to intermix with Indian Hindu art, and they progressively acquire more local elements.

== Museums ==
=== Major collections ===
- Peshawar Museum, Peshawar, Pakistan (largest collection in the world).
- Lahore Museum, Lahore, Pakistan.
- Taxila Museum, Taxila, Pakistan.
- National Museum of Pakistan, Karachi, Pakistan.
- Indian Museum, Kolkata, West Bengal, India (largest collection in India).
- Government Museum and Art Gallery, Chandigarh, India (627 artifacts; second largest in India).
- Mathura Museum, Mathura, India.
- National Museum, New Delhi, India
- Musée Guimet, Paris, France (about 150 artifacts, largest collection outside of Asia.)
- British Museum, London, Great Britain (about 100 artifacts), such as Seated Buddha from Gandhara
- Tokyo National Museum, Tokyo, Japan (about 50 artifacts)
- National Museum of Oriental Art, Rome, Italy (about 80 artifacts)
- Museum of Asian Art, Dahlem, Berlin, Germany.

=== Small collections ===
- Metropolitan Museum of Art, New York, United States
- Ancient Orient Museum, Tokyo, Japan (About 20 artifacts)
- Victoria and Albert Museum, London, Great Britain (About 30 artifacts)
- City Museum of Ancient Art in Palazzo Madama, Turin, Italy.
- Rubin Museum of Art in New York City, NY, United States.
- Chazen Museum of Art in Madison, WI, United States.

=== Private collections ===
- Collection de Marteau, Brussels, Belgium.

Timeline and influence of Greco-Buddhist art
Periods	Northern Asia	Central Asia	Gandhara	India	Southeast Asia
5th century BCE				Birth of Buddhism	
4th century BCE		Occupation by Alexander the Great (330 BCE)		Birth of Buddhism	
3rd-2nd century BCE		Seleucid Empire (300-250BCE) ---------- Greco-Bactrian kingdom (250-125 BCE) (Hellenistic art)	Mauryan Empire (321-185 BCE) (Aniconic art)		Introduction of Buddhism to Myanmar
2nd-1st century BCE	China, Han dynasty First mention of Buddhist statues brought from Central Asia (120 BCE)	Seleucid Empire (300-250BCE) ---------- Greco-Bactrian kingdom (250-125 BCE) (Hellenistic art)	Indo-Greek kingdom (180 BCE-10 CE); Buddhist symbolism and proselytism Free-standing Buddhas (Foucher &al.)	Shunga Empire (185-73 BCE)	
1st century BCE	China, Han dynasty First mention of Buddhist statues brought from Central Asia (120 BCE)	Yuezhi; Nomadic invaders, who became Hellenized and propagated Buddhism	Indo-Greek kingdom (180 BCE-10 CE); Buddhist symbolism and proselytism Free-standing Buddhas (Foucher &al.)	Indo-Scythians (80-20 CE)	
1st century CE	Official start of Buddhism in China. Arrival of statues of the Buddha in 70 CE.	Yuezhi; Nomadic invaders, who became Hellenized and propagated Buddhism	Indo-Parthians	Art of Mathura	
1st-3rd century CE	First known Buddha statues in China (later Han, c.200 CE)	Kushan Empire (10-350 CE)			
4th-6th century CE	Tarim Basin China Start of Buddhism in Japan	Bactria	Gupta Empire (320-550 CE)		Mahayana Buddhism in Siam, Cambodia and Vietnam
7th-13th century CE	Japan	Islamic invasions		Pala Empire (11th century)	Southeast Asia Introduction of Theravada from Sri Lanka in the 11th century

== See also ==
- Kushan art
- Indo-Greek art
- Buddhist art
- Greco-Buddhism
- Index of Buddhism-related articles
- History of Buddhism
