= Jules Barthoux =

French geologist and archaeologist

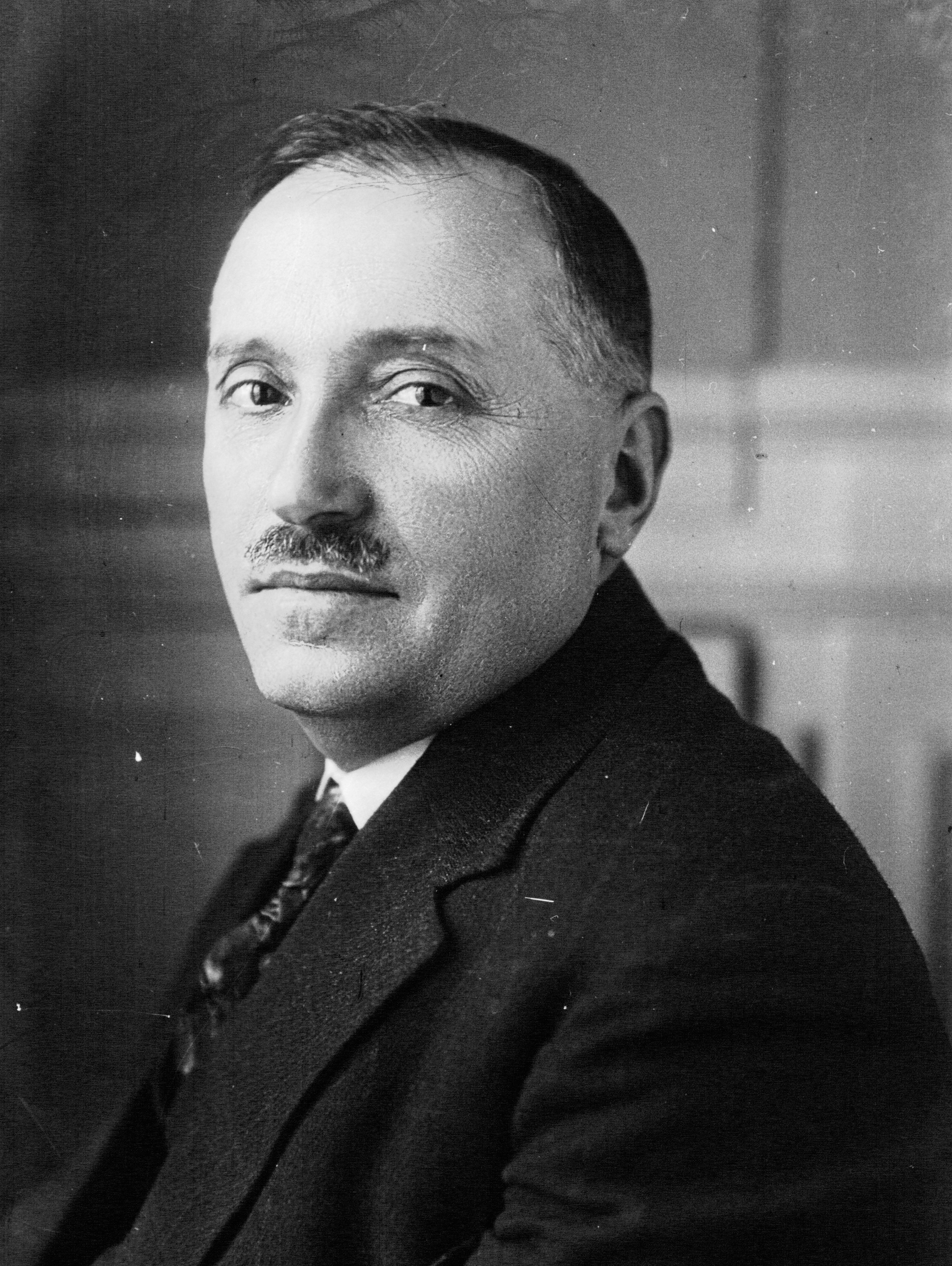
- Born: Jules Couyat-Barthoux; 22 July 1881; Etroussat, France
- Died: 22 February 1965 (aged 83); Paris, France
- Years active: c. 1912-1928
- Known for: Archaeology in Afghanistan as part of DAFA

Jules Barthoux or Jules Couyat-Barthoux (1881-1965) was a French geologist and archaeologist born in Etroussat in 1881. He excavated the sites of Bagram, Hadda and Ai-Khanoum in Afghanistan, as part of the French Archaeological Delegation in Afghanistan (DAFA), between 1925 and 1928. He died in 1965 in the 20th arrondissement of Paris, in Paris, France.

He and Pierre Montet worked in Cairo together in 1911.

== Works ==
- The hieroglyphic and hieratic inscriptions of Ouâdi Hammâmât with P. Montet, Cairo (1912) (with Pierre Montet), 1912
- Chronology and description of igneous rocks of the Arabian desert, Cairo (1922)
- Description of a fortress of Saladin discovered in Sinai: the inscriptions of the Qal'ah Guindi with G. Wiet, Paris (1922)
- Notes of Moroccan metallogeny, Tours (1923)
- Description of some Moroccan minerals, Paris (1924)
- The excavations of Haḍḍa I, Stupas and sites. Text and drawings, Paris (1933)
- The excavations of Haḍḍa, Paris (1933)
- The excavations of Hadda III, figures and figurines, Tours (1930)
- Provisional Geological Map of Djebilet, sl
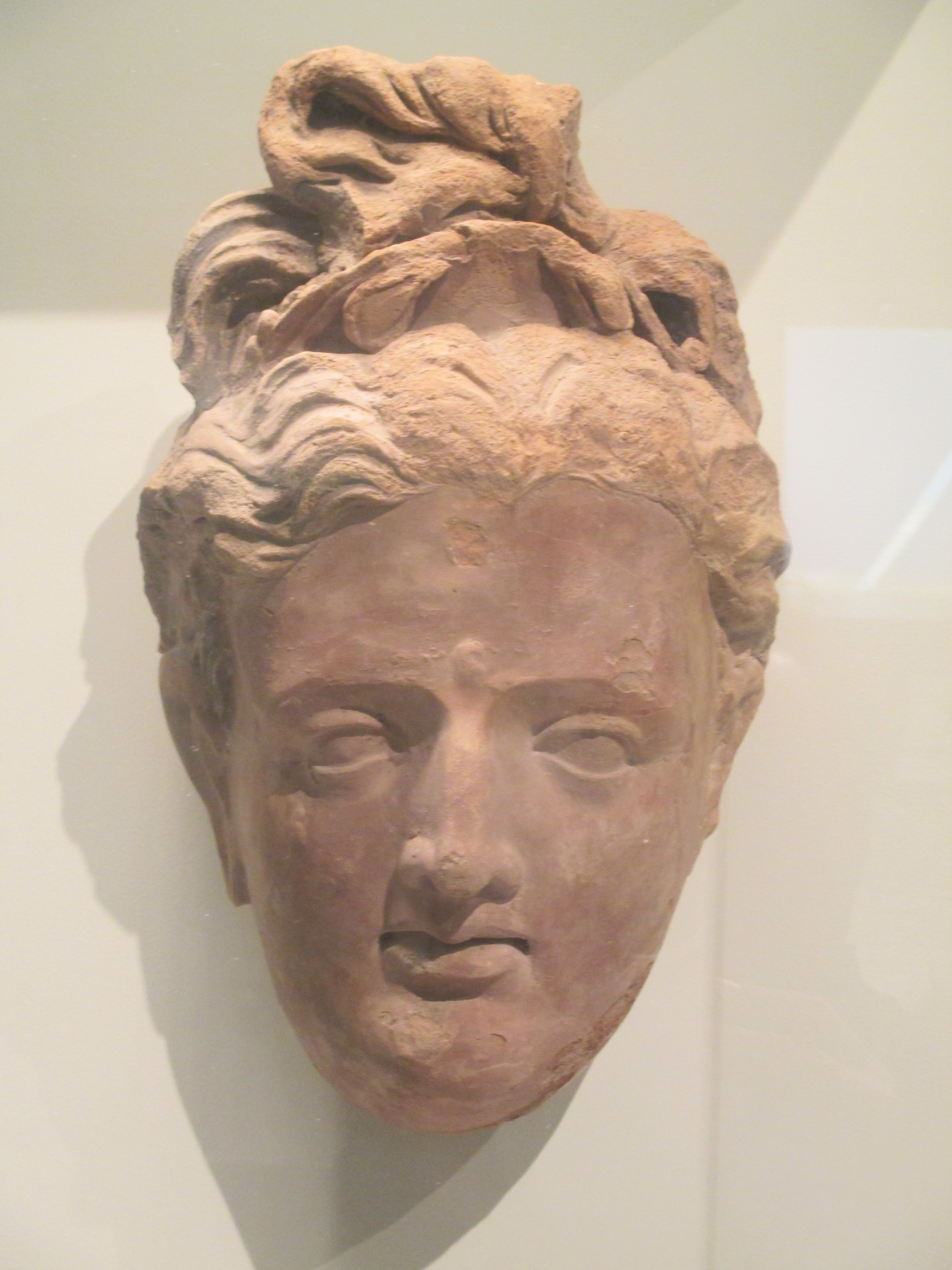
The head of a Greco-Buddhist statue found by Jules Barthoux at Hadda in 1928 (Musée Guimet)

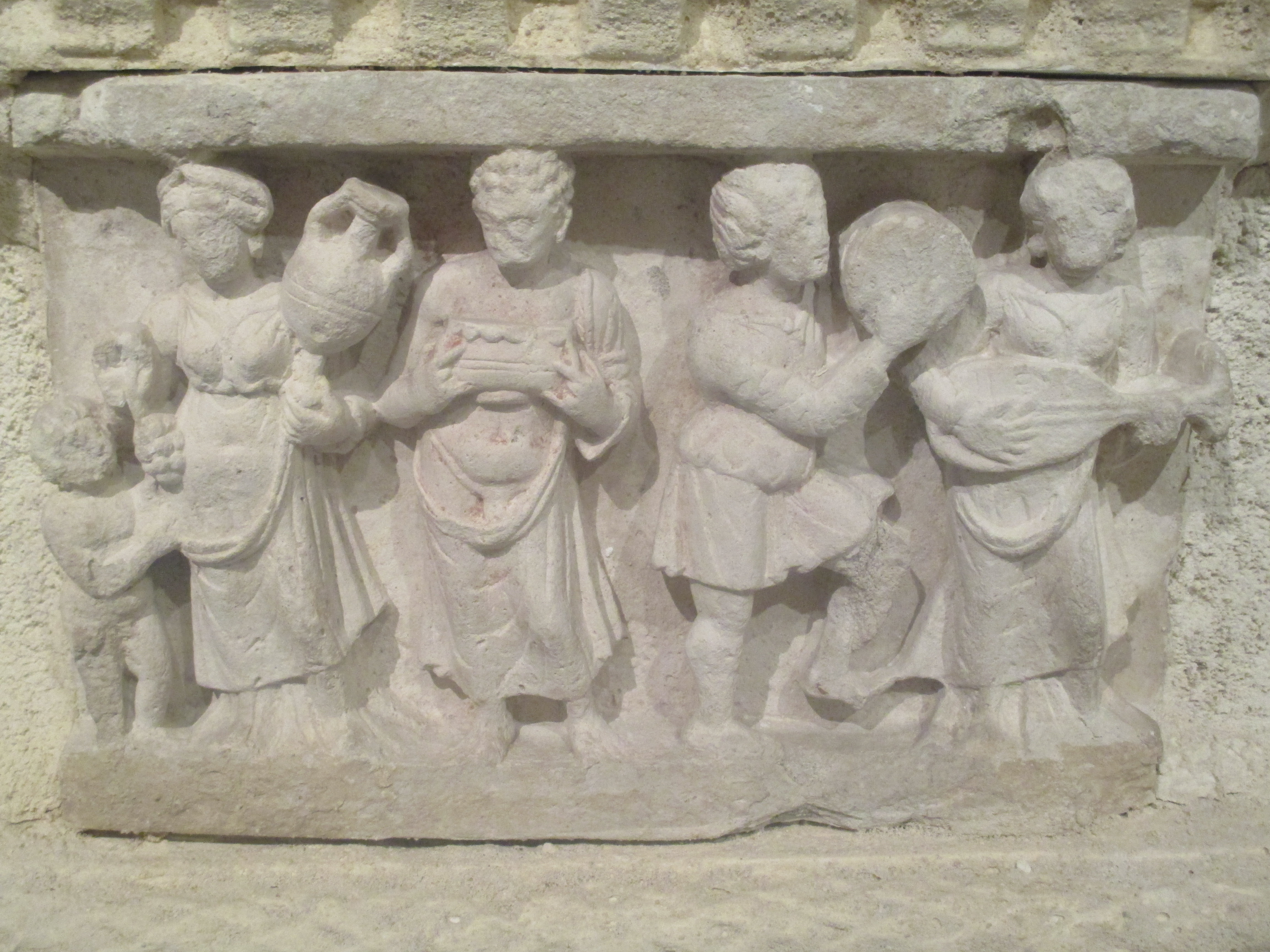
Detail of a staircase of the Chakhil-i-Ghoundi monastery in Hadda
