= Hadda, Afghanistan =

Archaeological site in Afghanistan

Hadda
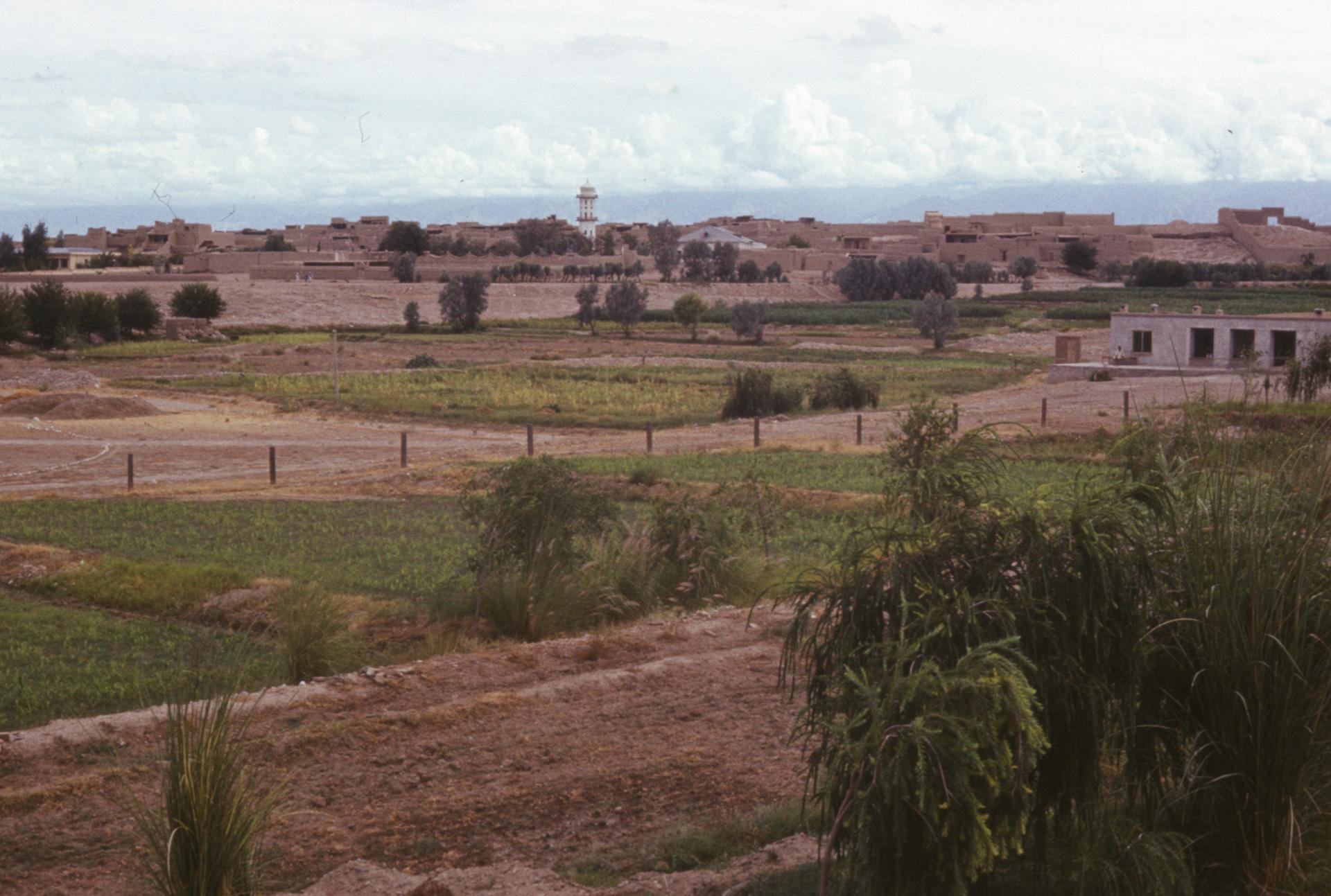
- The village of Hadda, seen from Tapa Shotor in 1976.

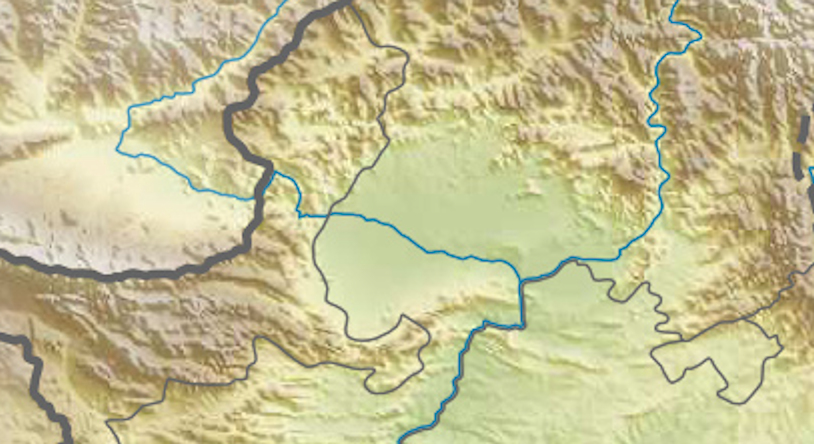
- Location within Afghanistan Location within Gandhara Location within South Asia
- 34.361685°N 70.470752°E
- Type: Group of Buddhist monasteries

History
- Built: 1st century BCE
- Abandoned: 9th century CE

Haḍḍa (Pashto: هډه) is a Greco-Buddhist archeological site located ten kilometers south of the city of Jalalabad, in the Nangarhar Province of eastern Afghanistan.

Hadda is said to have been almost entirely destroyed in the fighting during the civil war in Afghanistan. In early 1980, three independent sources reported that a 2nd century B.C. Buddha statue and other antiquities were destroyed in a museum at Hadda.

== Background ==
Some 23,000 Greco-Buddhist sculptures, both clay and plaster, were excavated in Hadda during the 1930s and the 1970s. The findings combine elements of Buddhism and Hellenism in an almost perfect Hellenistic style.

Although the style of the artifacts is typical of the late Hellenistic 2nd or 1st century BCE, the Hadda sculptures are usually dated (although with some uncertainty), to the 1st century CE or later (i.e. one or two centuries afterward). This discrepancy might be explained by a preservation of late Hellenistic styles for a few centuries in this part of the world. However it is possible that the artifacts actually were produced in the late Hellenistic period.

Given the antiquity of these sculptures and a technical refinement indicative of artists fully conversant with all the aspects of Greek sculpture, it has been suggested that Greek communities were directly involved in these realizations, and that "the area might be the cradle of incipient Buddhist sculpture in Indo-Greek style".

The style of many of the works at Hadda is highly Hellenistic, and can be compared to sculptures found at the Temple of Apollo in Bassae, Greece.

The toponym Hadda has its origins in Sanskrit haḍḍa n. m., "a bone", or, an unrecorded *haḍḍaka, adj., "(place) of bones". The former - if not a fossilized form - would have given rise to a Haḍḍ in the subsequent vernaculars of northern India (and in the Old Indic loans in modern Pashto). The latter would have given rise to the form Haḍḍa naturally and would well reflect the belief that Hadda housed a bone-relic of Buddha. The term haḍḍa is found as a loan in Pashto haḍḍ, n., id. and may reflect the linguistic influence of the original pre-Islamic population of the area.

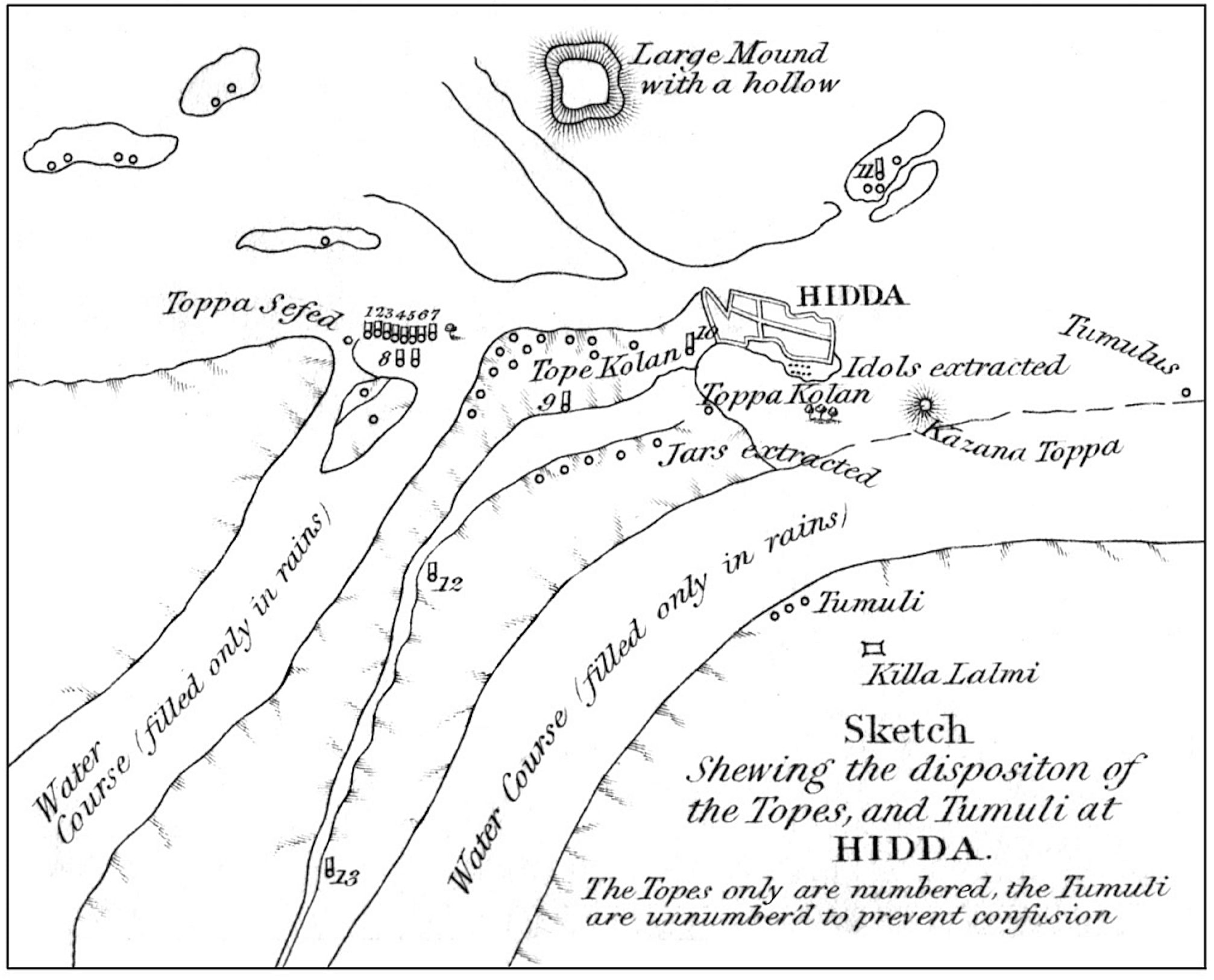
Map of Hadda by Charles Masson, 1841

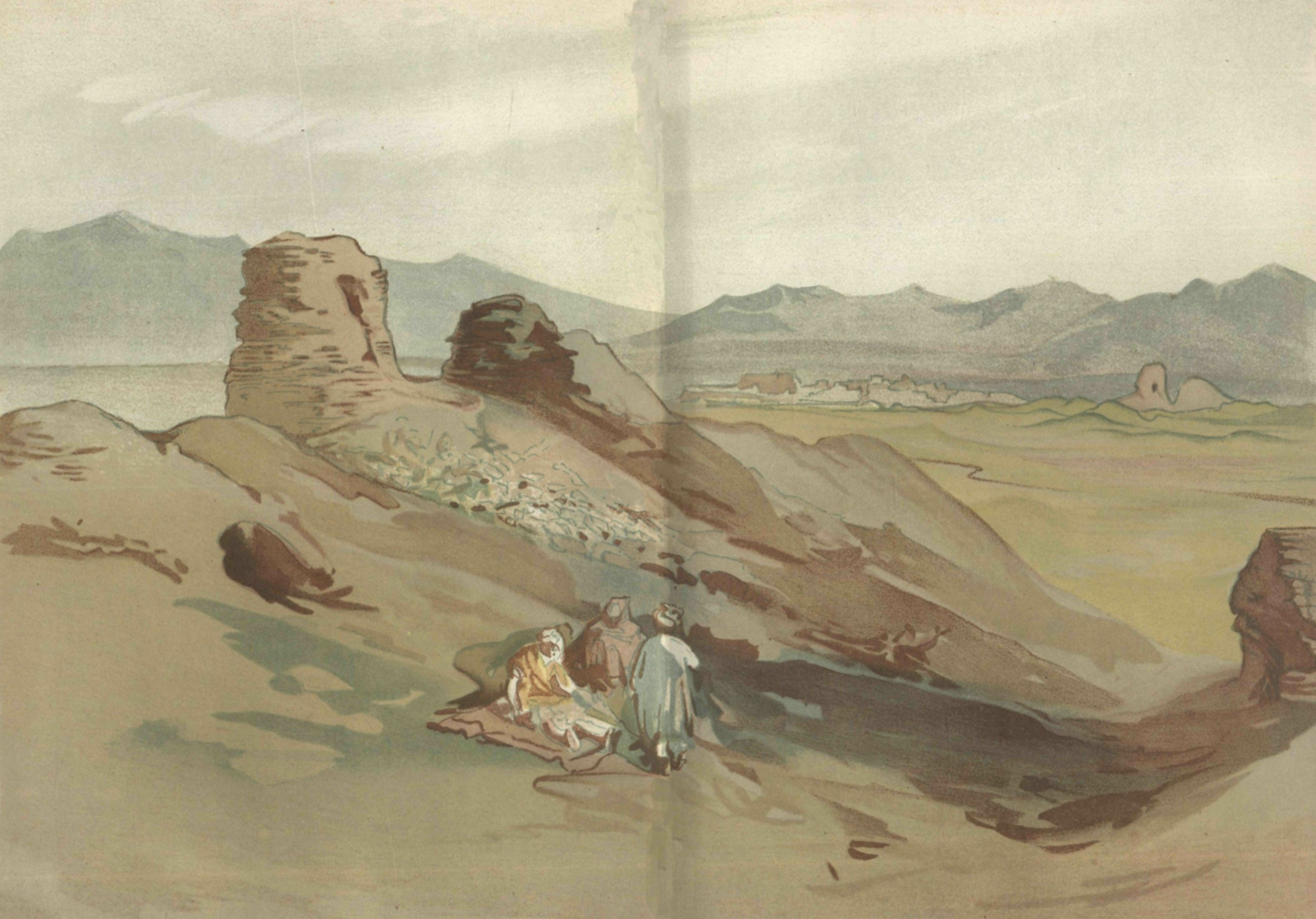
Buddhist stupas at Hadda, by William Simpson, 1881

== Buddhist scriptures ==
It is believed the oldest surviving Buddhist manuscripts, in fact the oldest surviving Indian manuscripts of any kind, were recovered around Hadda. Probably dating from around the 1st century CE, they were written on bark in Gandhari using the Kharoṣṭhī script, and were unearthed in a clay pot bearing an inscription in the same language and script. They are part of the long-lost canon of the Sarvastivadin Sect that dominated Gandhara and was instrumental in Buddhism's spread into central and east Asia via the Silk Road. The manuscripts are now in the possession of the British Library.

== Tapa Shotor monastery (2nd century CE) ==
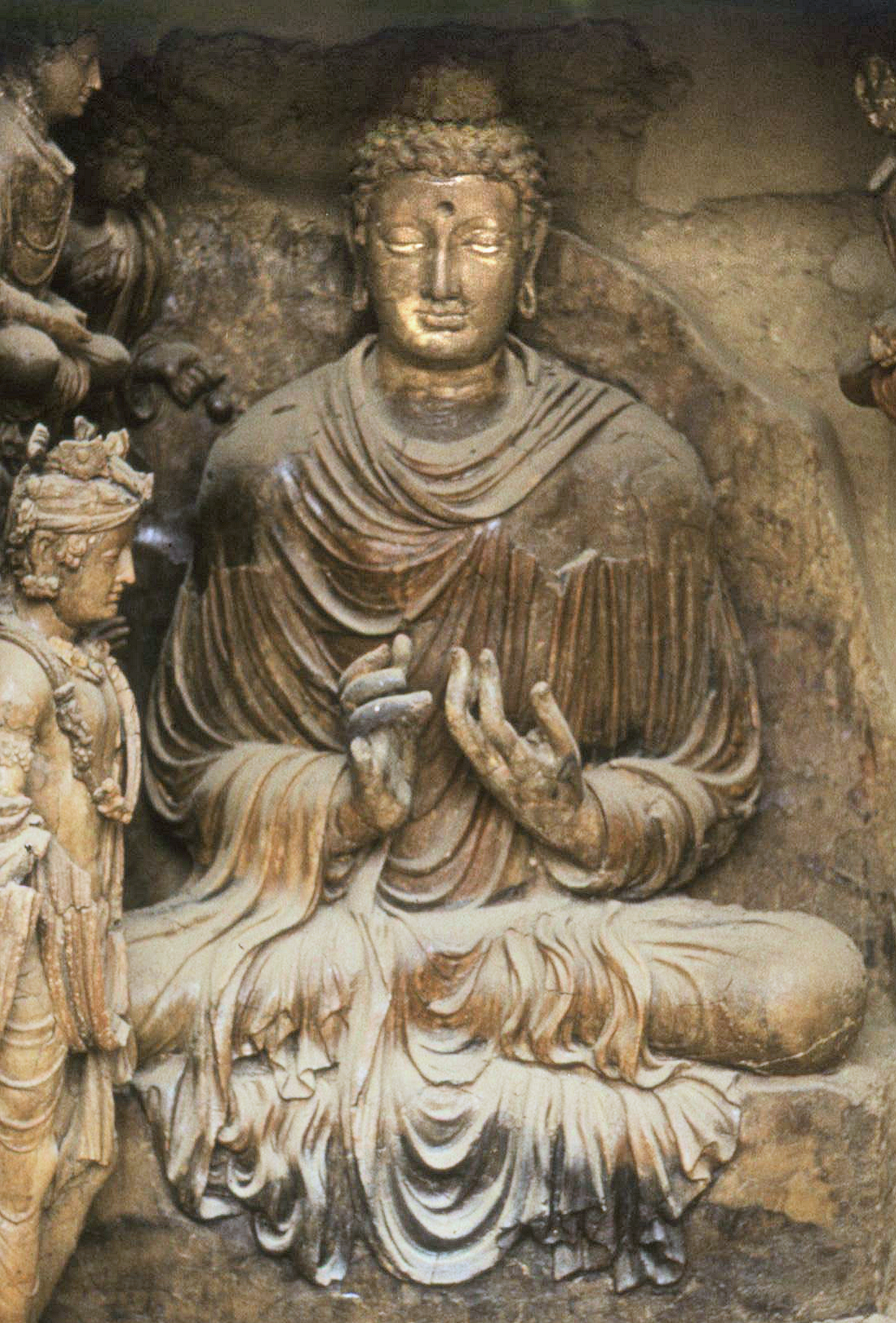
Seated Buddha, Tapa Shotor monastery (Niche V1), 2nd century CE, Hadda

Tapa Shotor was a large Sarvastivadin Buddhist monastery. According to archaeologist Raymond Allchin, the site of Tapa Shotor suggests that the Greco-Buddhist art of Gandhara descended directly from the art of Hellenistic Bactria, as seen in Ai-Khanoum.

The earliest structures at Tapa Shotor (labelled "Tapa Shotor I" by archaeologists) date to the Indo-Scythian king Azes II (35-12 BCE).

A sculptural group excavated at the Hadda site of Tapa-i-Shotor represents Buddha surrounded by perfectly Hellenistic Herakles and Tyche holding a cornucopia. The only adaptation of the Greek iconography is that Herakles holds the thunderbolt of Vajrapani rather than his usual club.

According to Tarzi, Tapa Shotor, with clay sculptures dated to the 2nd century CE, represents the "missing link" between the Hellenistic art of Bactria, and the later stucco sculptures found at Hadda, usually dated to the 3rd-4th century CE. The scultptures of Tapa Shortor are also contemporary with many of the early Buddhist sculptures found in Gandhara.

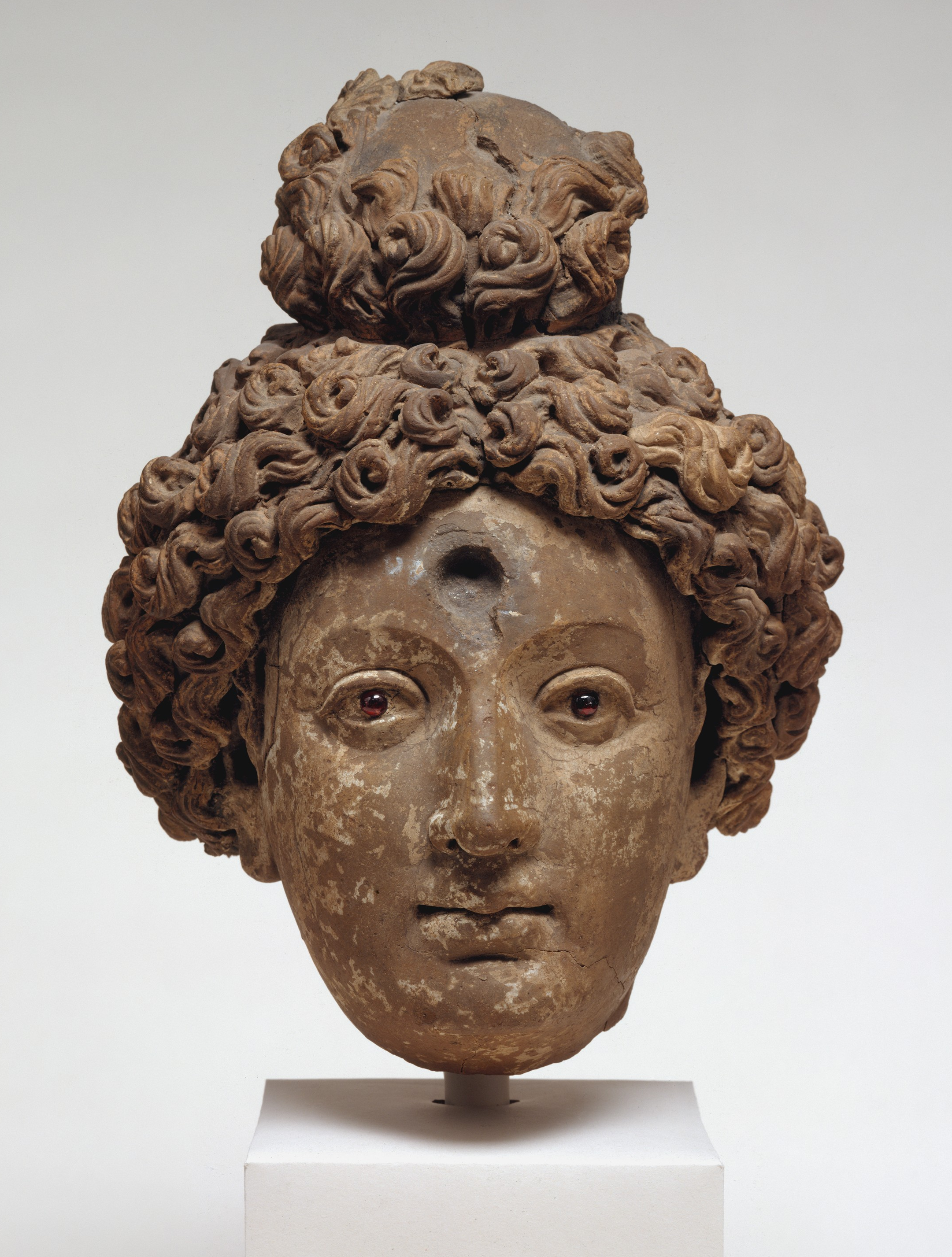
Head of a Buddha or Bodhisattva, facing (4th-5th century), probably Hadda, Tapa Shotor.

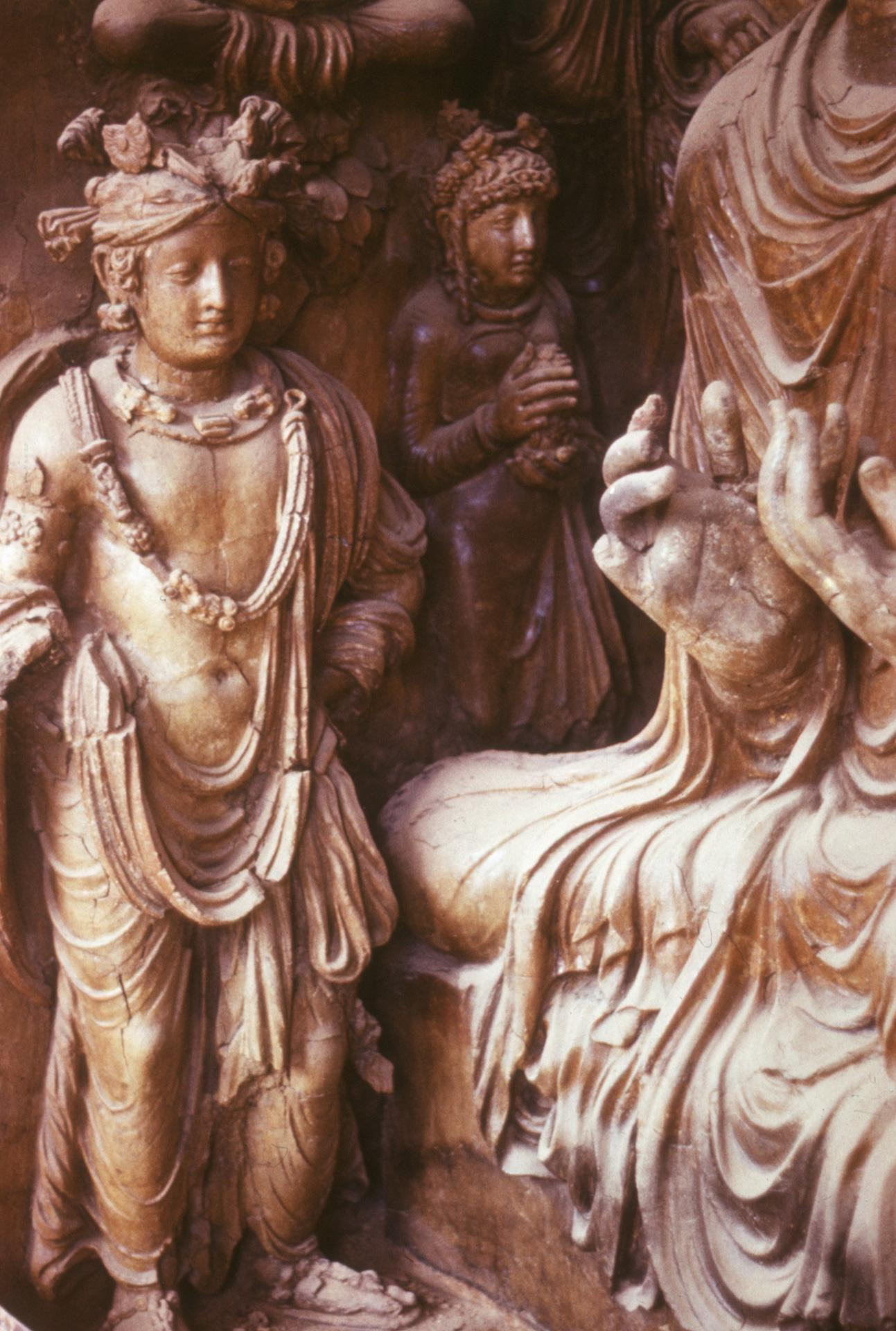
Attendants to the Buddha, Tapa Shotor (Niche V1)

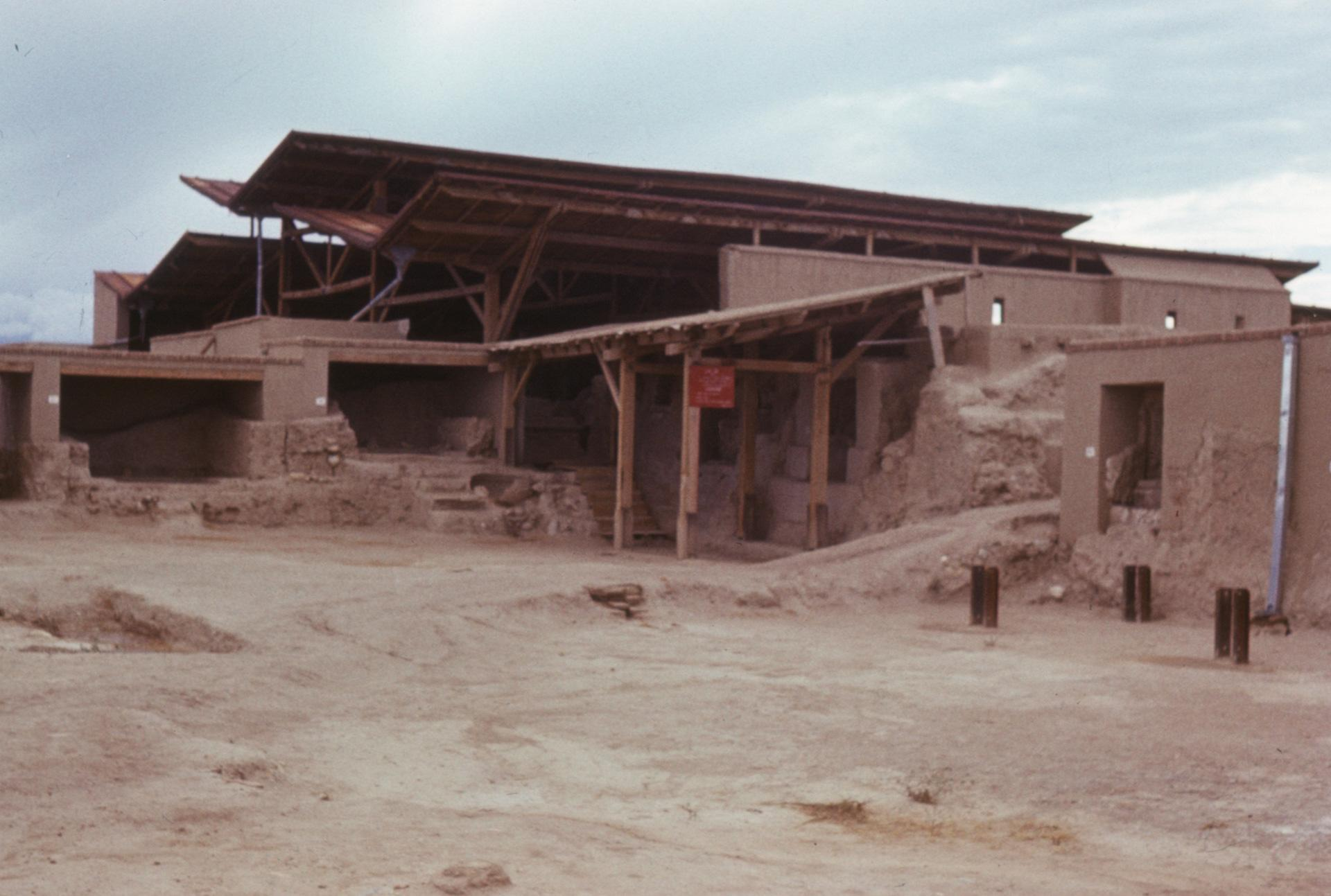
Site of Tapa Shotor, with a protective roof.

== Chakhil-i-Ghoundi monastery (2nd-3rd century CE) ==
The Chakhil-i-Ghoundi monastery is dated to the 4th-5th century CE. It is built around the Chakhil-i-Ghoundi Stupa, a small limestone stupa. Most of the remains of the stupa were gathered in 1928 by the archeological mission of Frenchman Jules Barthoux of the French Archaeological Delegation in Afghanistan, and have been preserved and reconstituted through a collaboration with the Tokyo National Museum. They are today on display at the Musée Guimet in Paris. It is usually dated to the 2nd-3rd century CE.

The decoration of the stupa provides an interesting case of Greco-Buddhist art, combining Hellenistic and Indian artistic elements. The reconstitution consists of several parts, the decorated stupa base, the canopy, and various decorative elements.

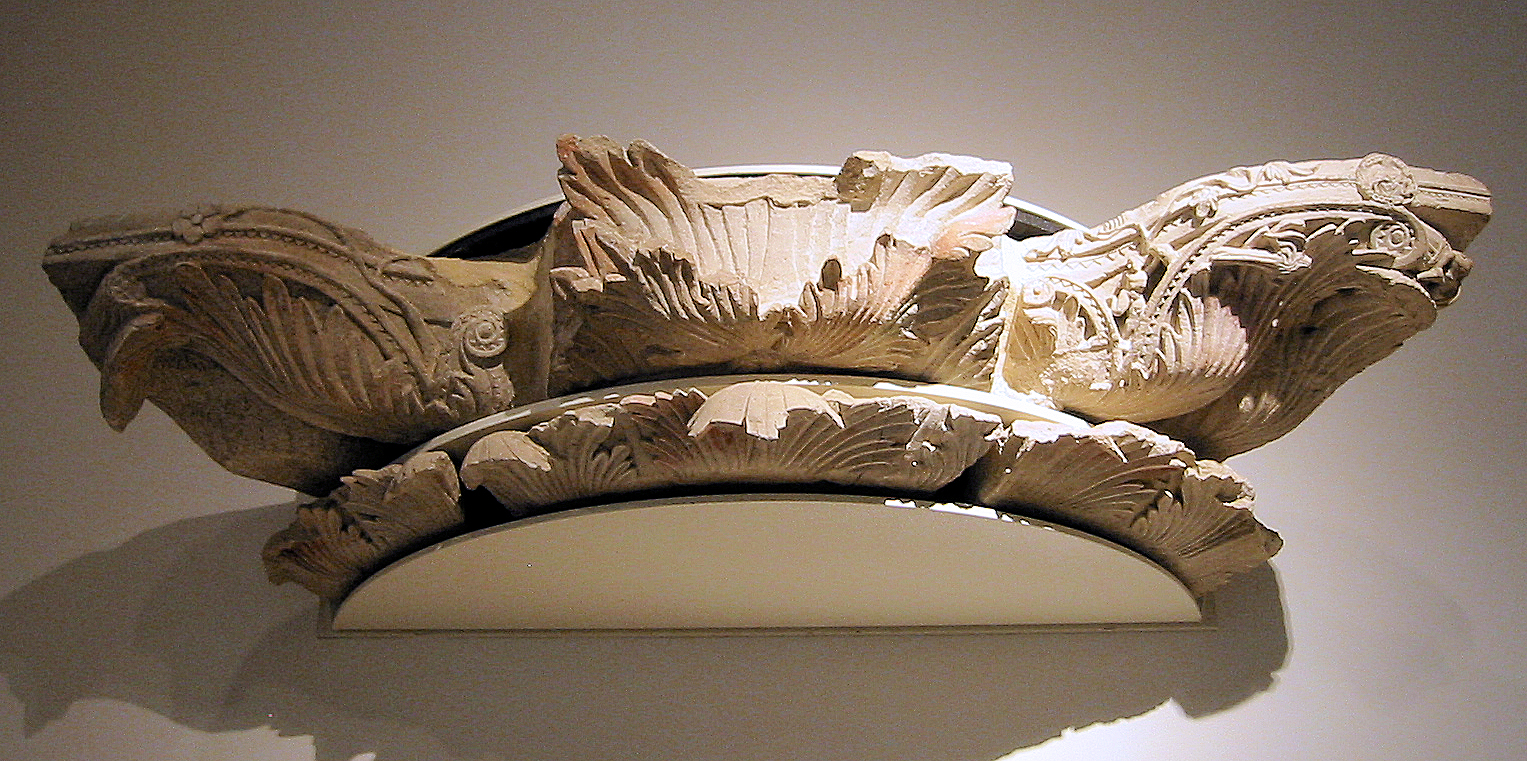
Canopy of the stupa

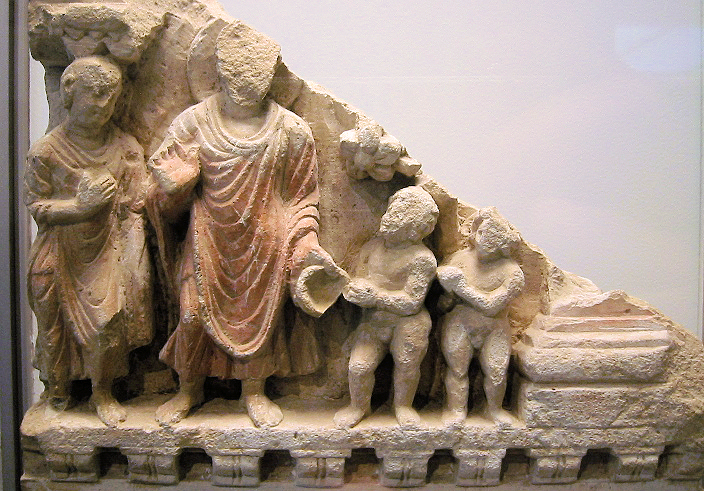
Scene of "The Gift of Dirt", Chakhil-i-Ghoundi Stupa, Gandhara.

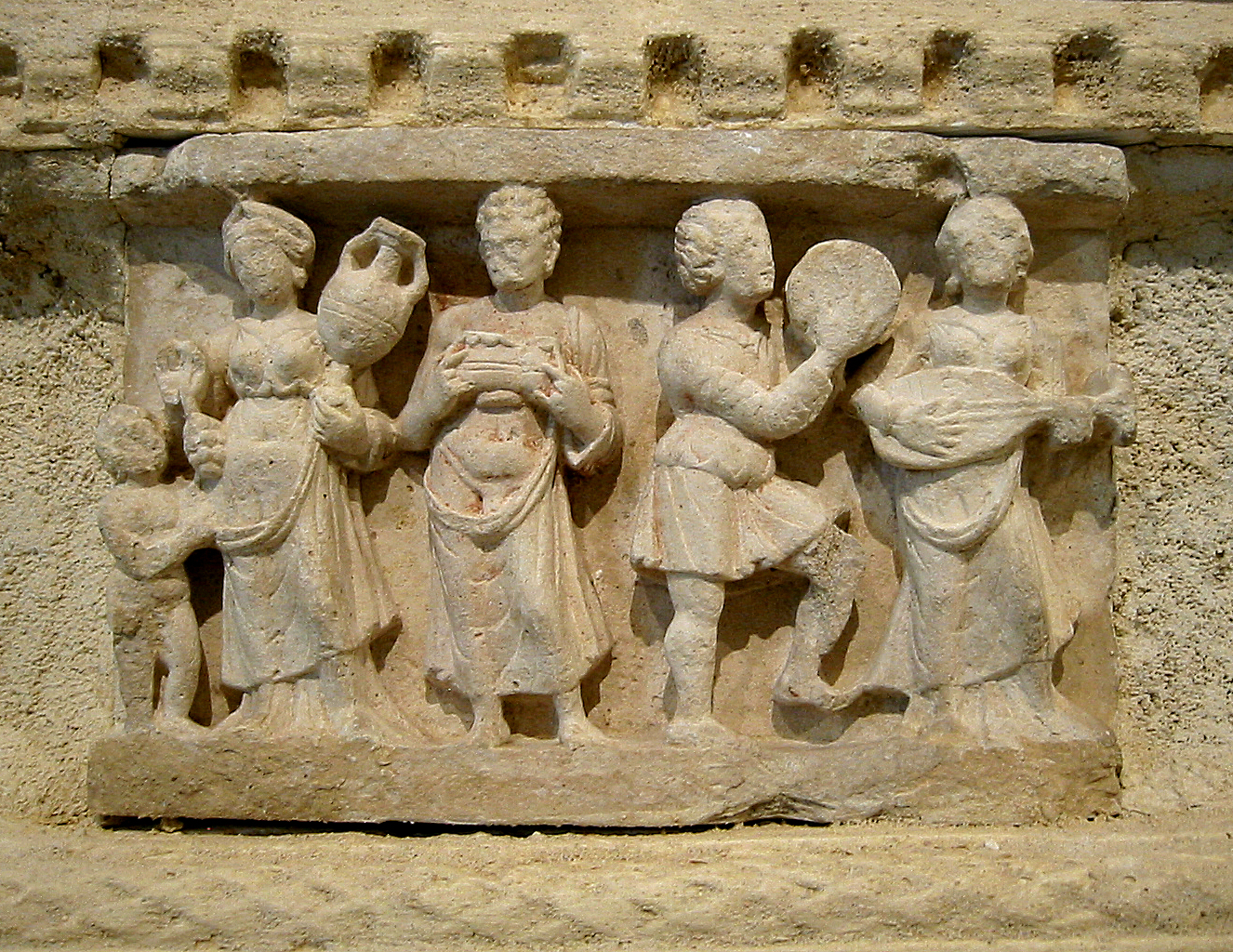
Wine and dance scene, with people in Hellenistic clothing

== Tapa Kalan monastery (4th-5th century CE) ==
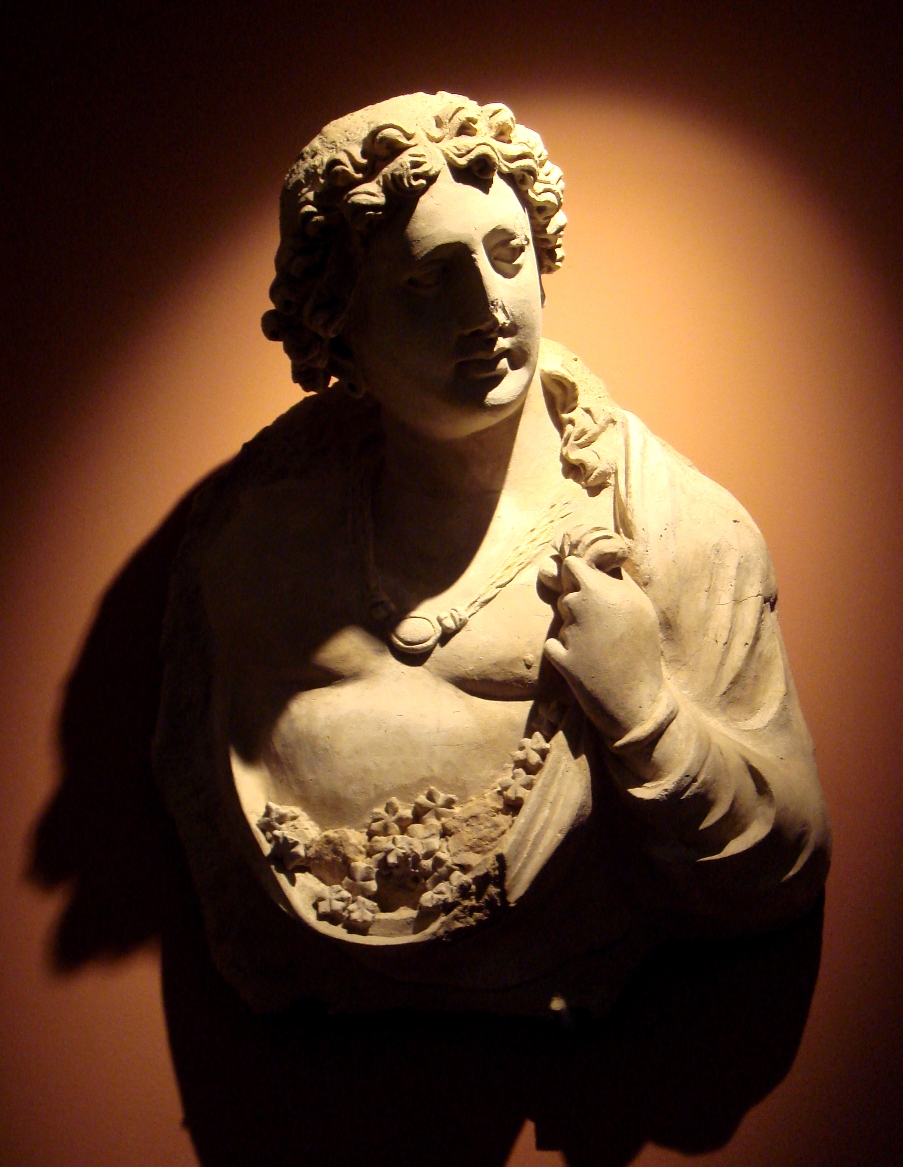
The "Genius with flowers", Tapa Kalan, Hadda, Gandhara. 2-3rd century CE. Musée Guimet.

The Tapa Kalan monastery is dated to the 4th-5th century CE. It was excavated by Jules Barthoux.

One of its most famous artifact is an attendant to the Buddha who display manifest Hellenistic styles, the "Genie au Fleur", today in Paris at the Guimet Museum.

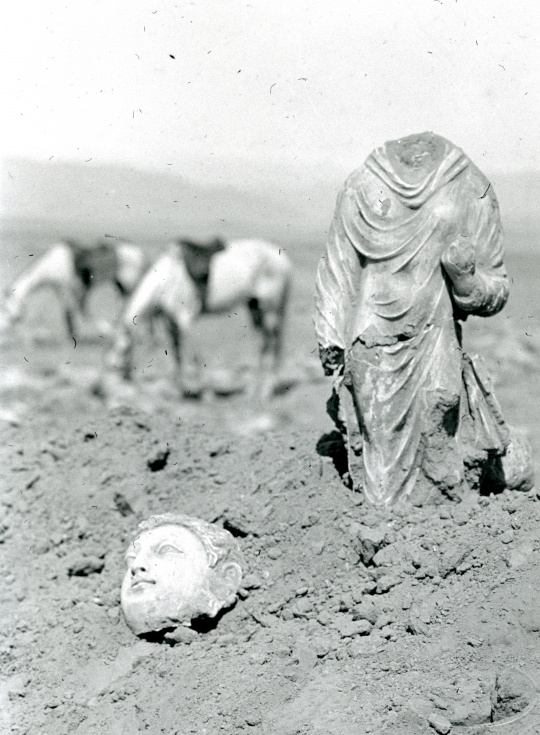
Buddha statue in Tapa Kalan, Hadda

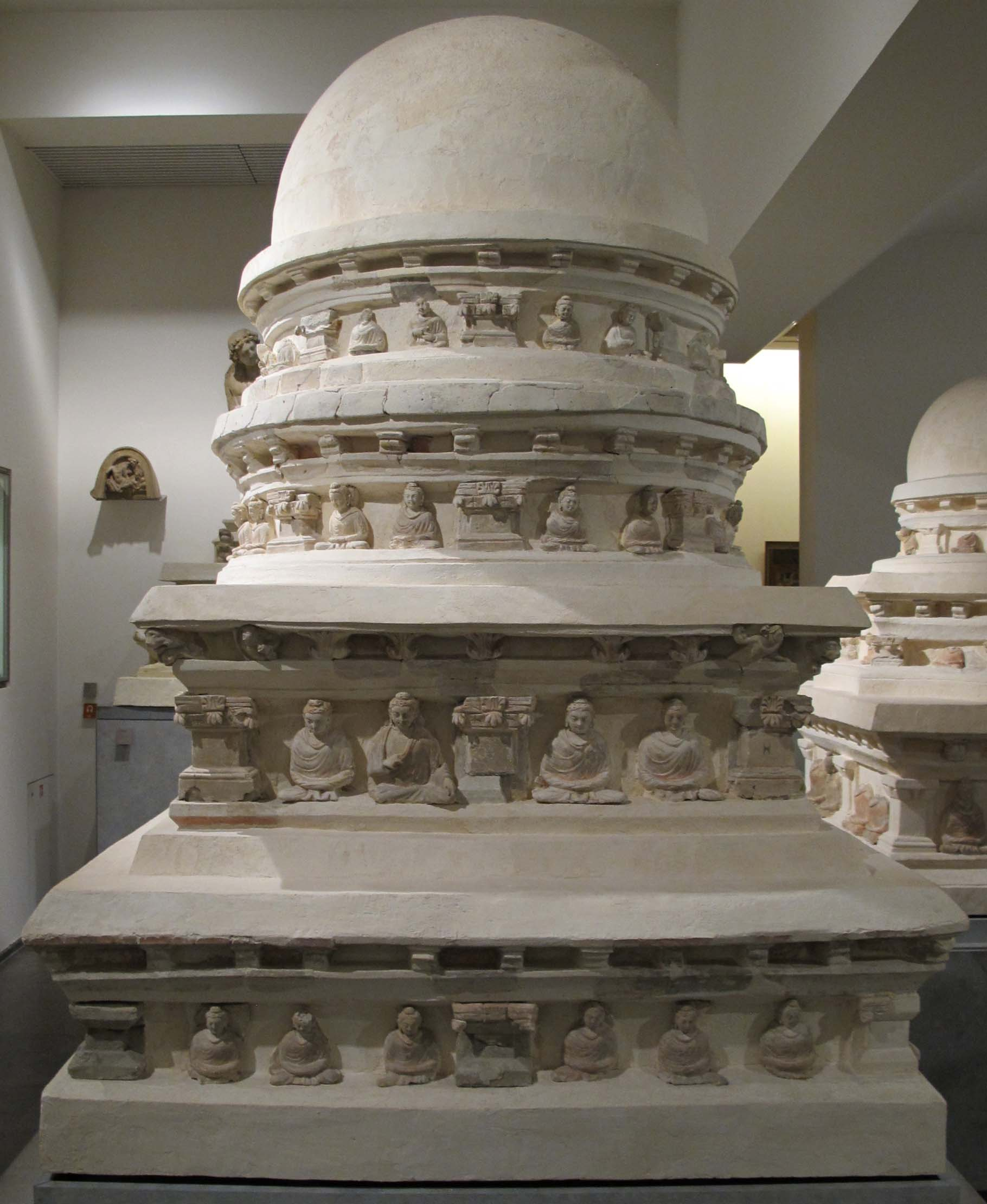
Small stupa decorated with Buddhas, Tapa Kalan, 4th-5th century CE

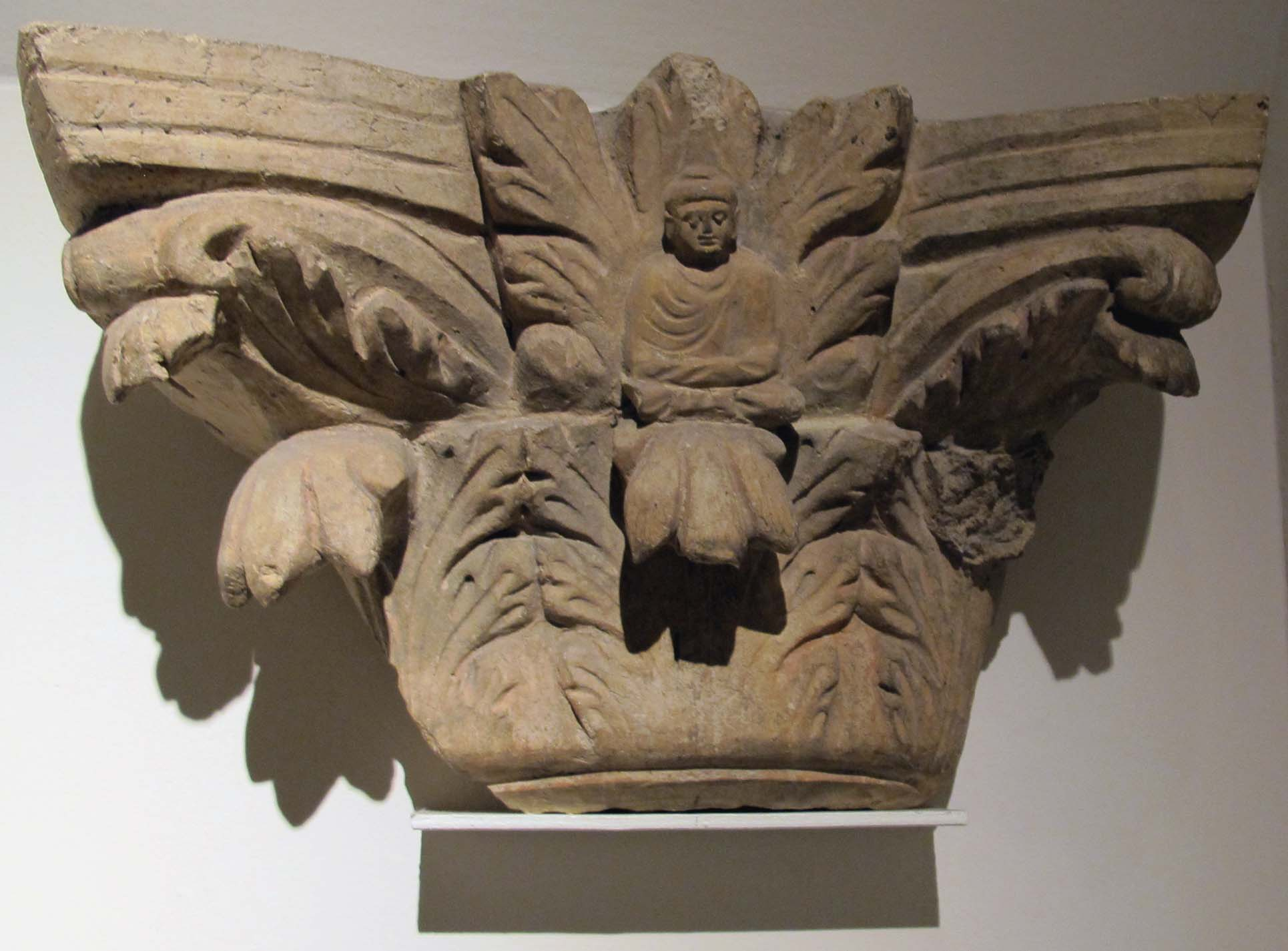
Indo-Corinthian capital, with figure of the Buddha inside acanthus leaves. Tapa Kalan.

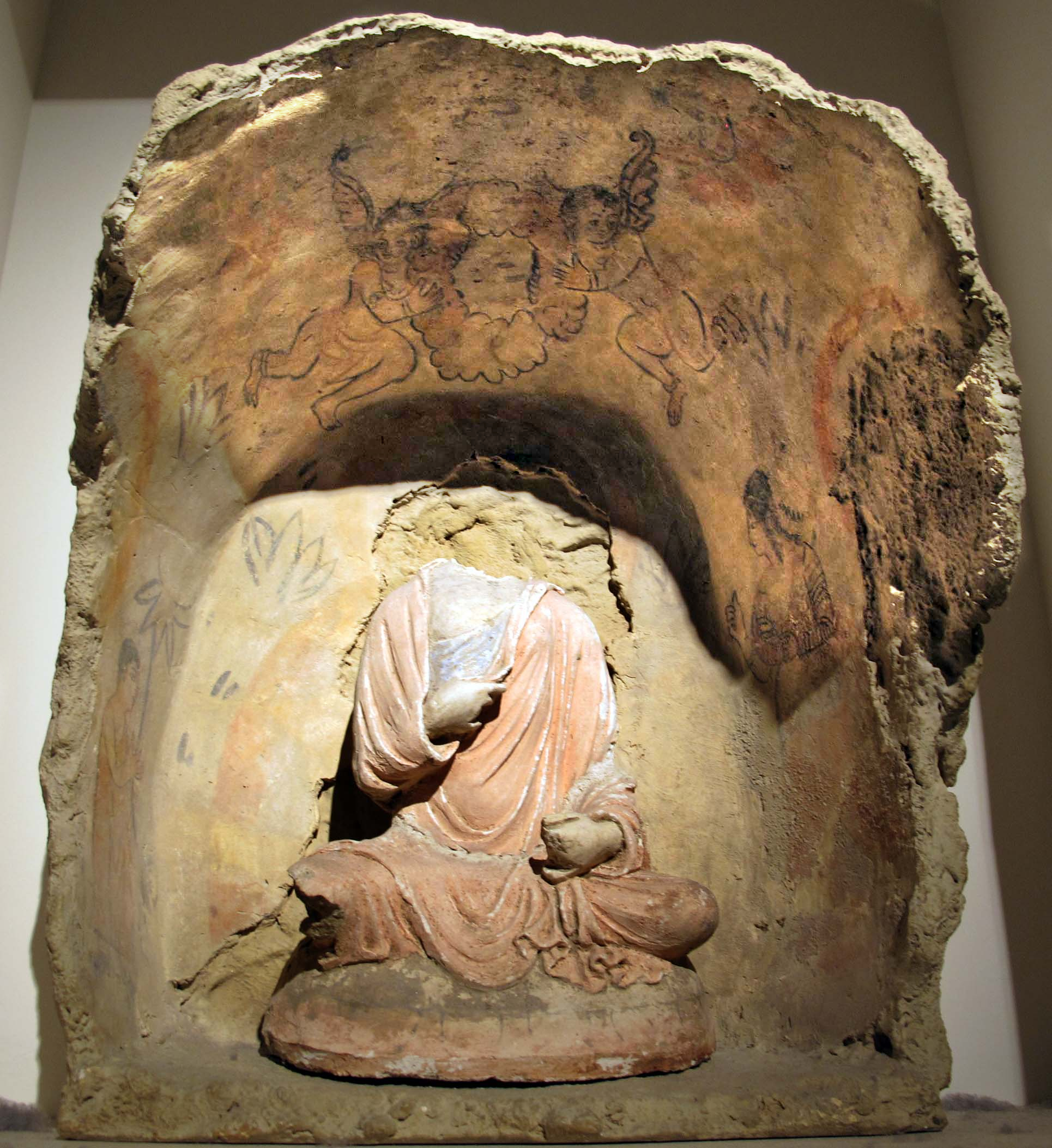
Buddha with flying Erotes holding a wreath overhead, Tapa Kalan, 3rd century CE

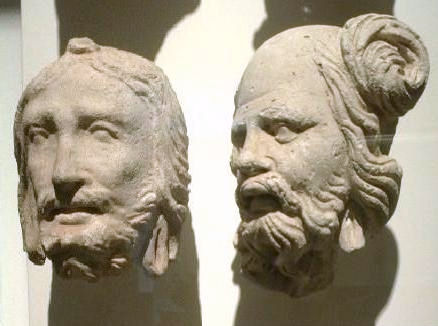
Heads, Tapa Kalan.

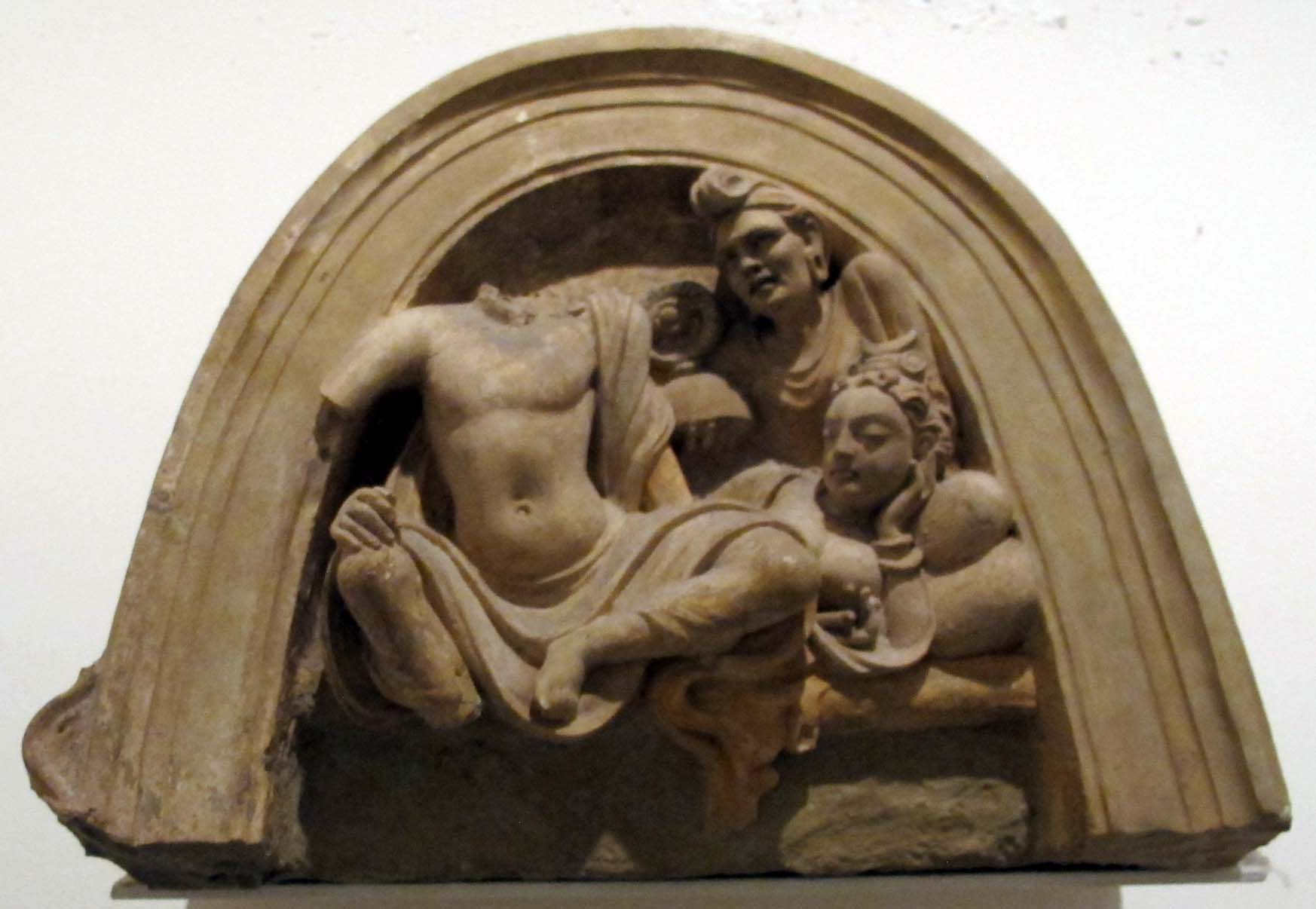
The Great Departure

== Bagh-Gai monastery (3rd-4th century CE) ==
The Bagh-Gai monastery is generally dated to the 3rd-4th century CE. Bagh-Gai has many small stupas with decorated niches.

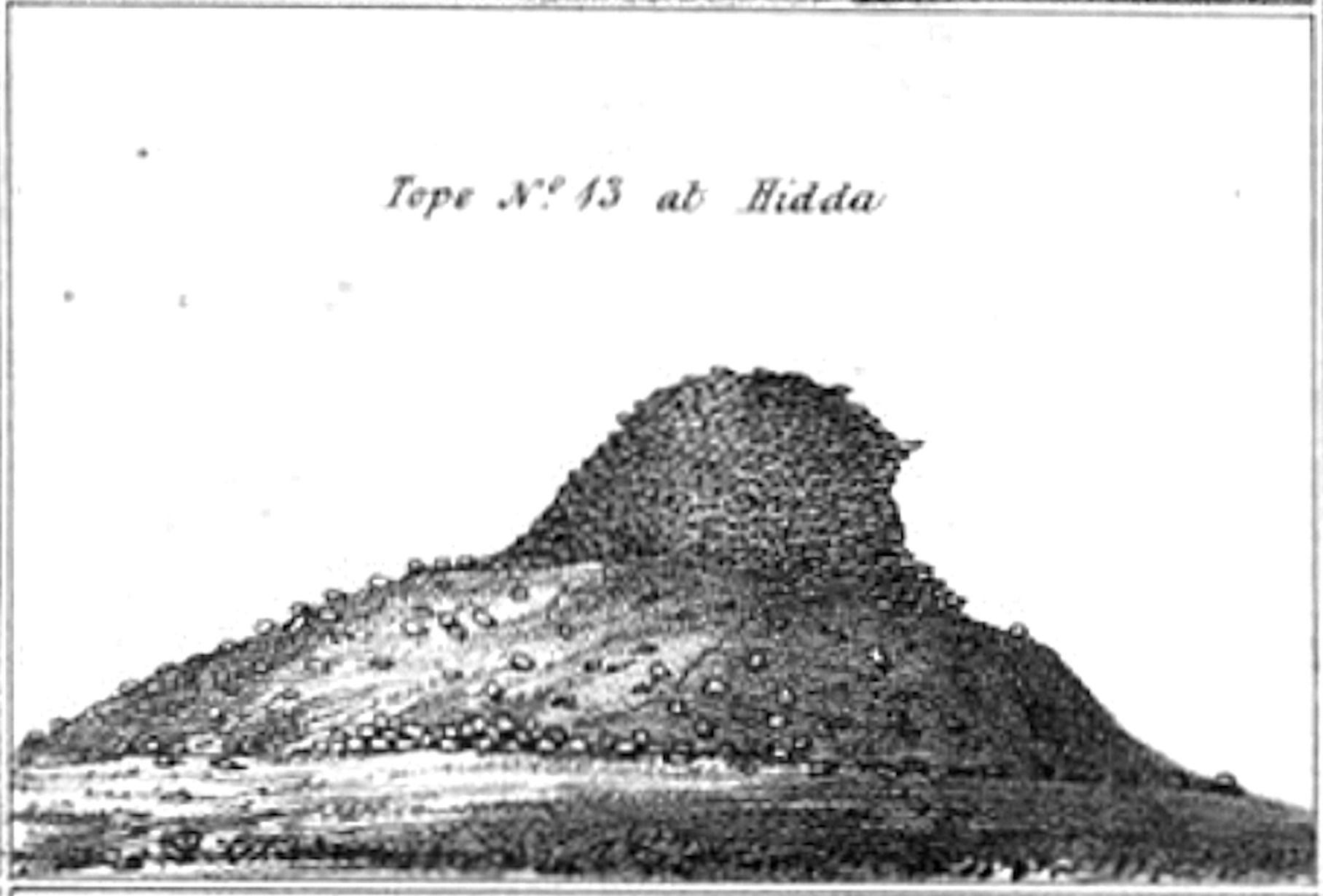
Hadda number 13, Bagh Gai monastery, by Charles Masson, 1842.

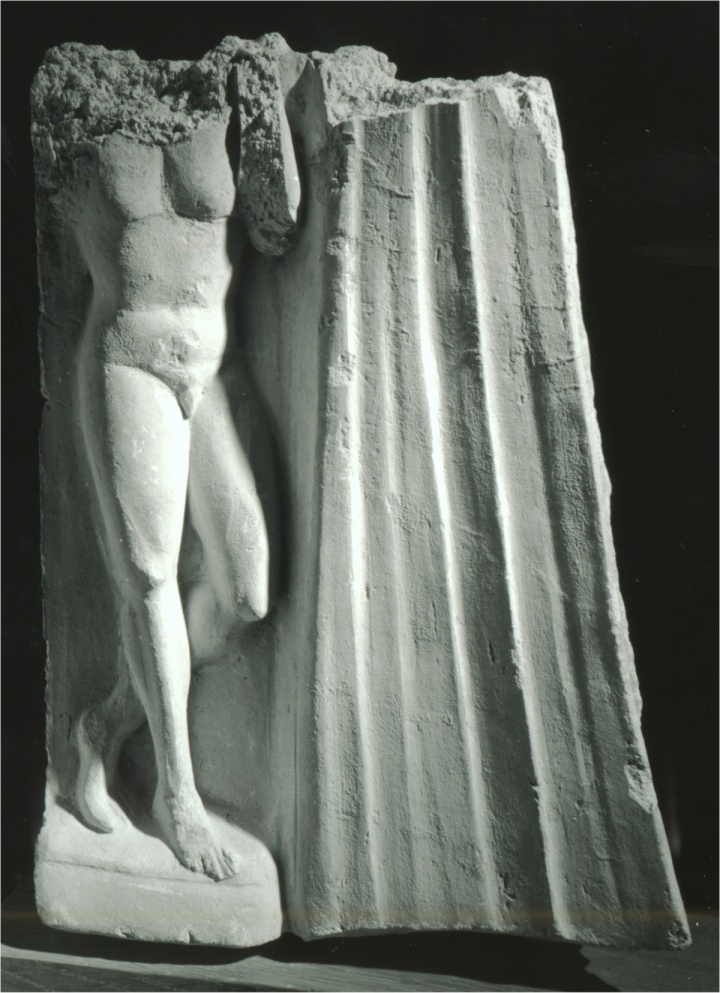
Sculpture from Bagh-Gai

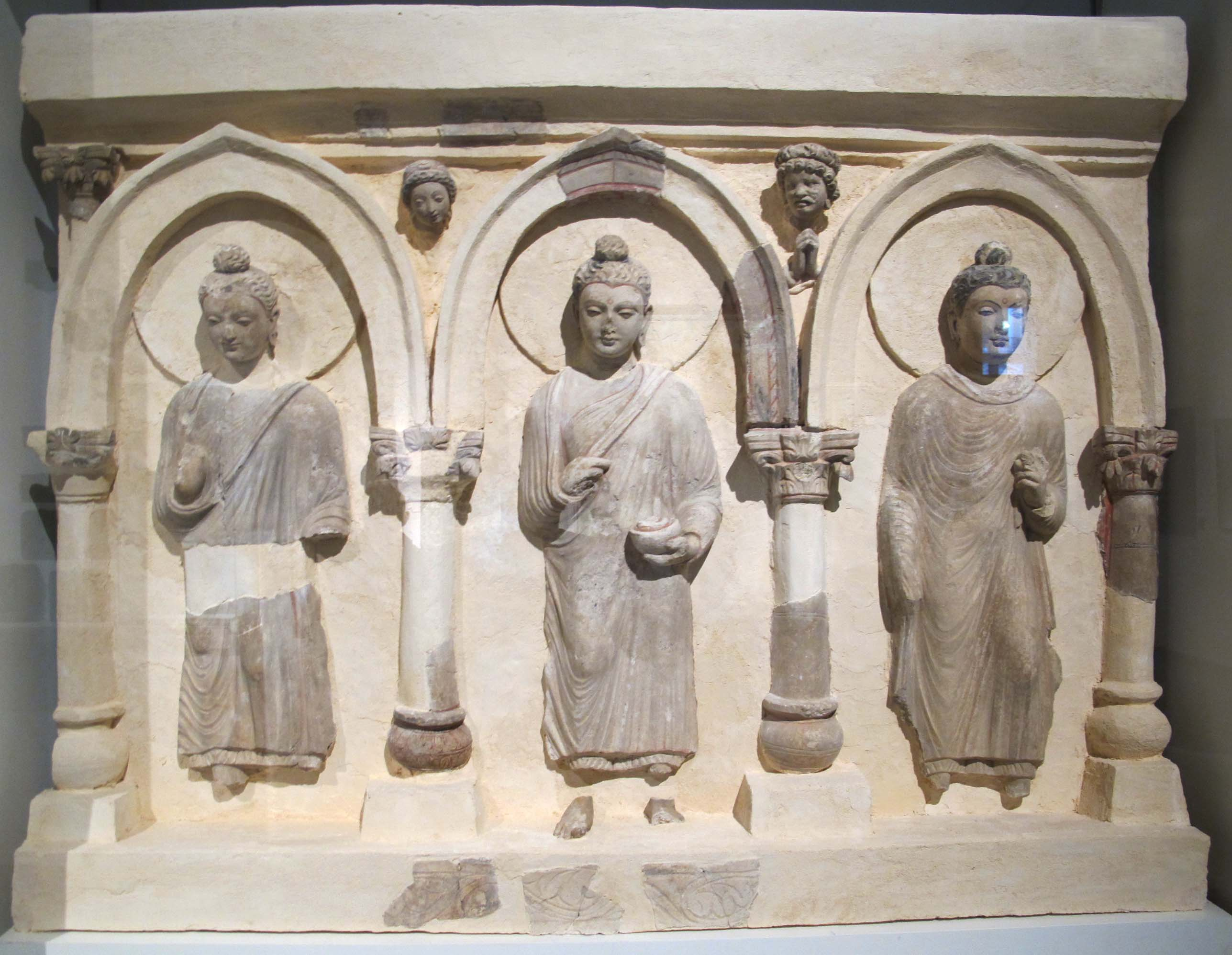
Decorative panel, Bagh-Gai monastery

== Tapa-i Kafariha Monastery (3rd-4th century CE) ==
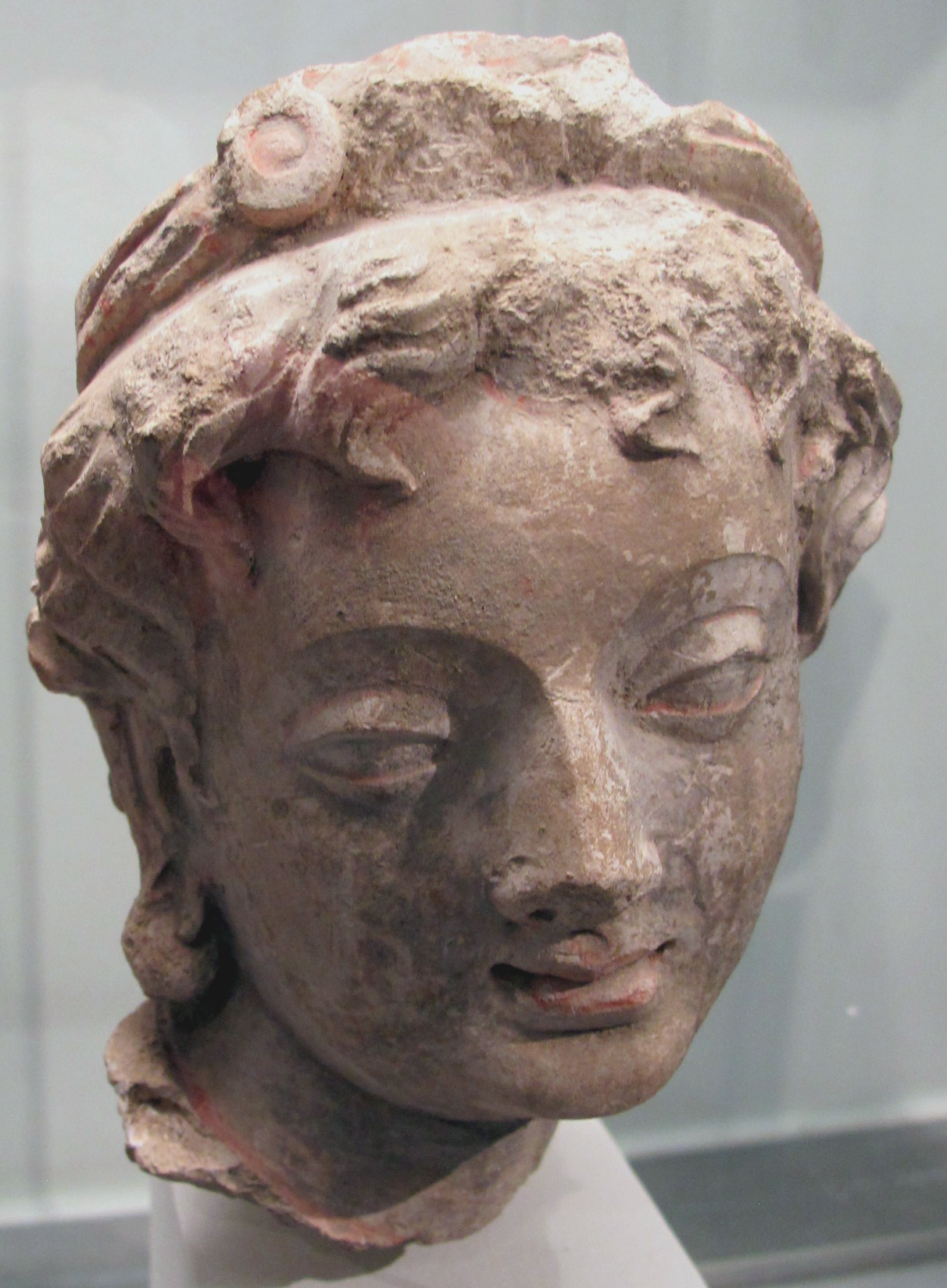
Head of a female devotee, Tapa-i-Kafariha, III-IVth cent.

The Tapa-i Kafariha Monastery is generally dated to the 3rd-4th century CE. It was excavated in 1926–27 by an expedition led by Jules Barthoux as part of the French Archaeological Delegation to Afghanistan.

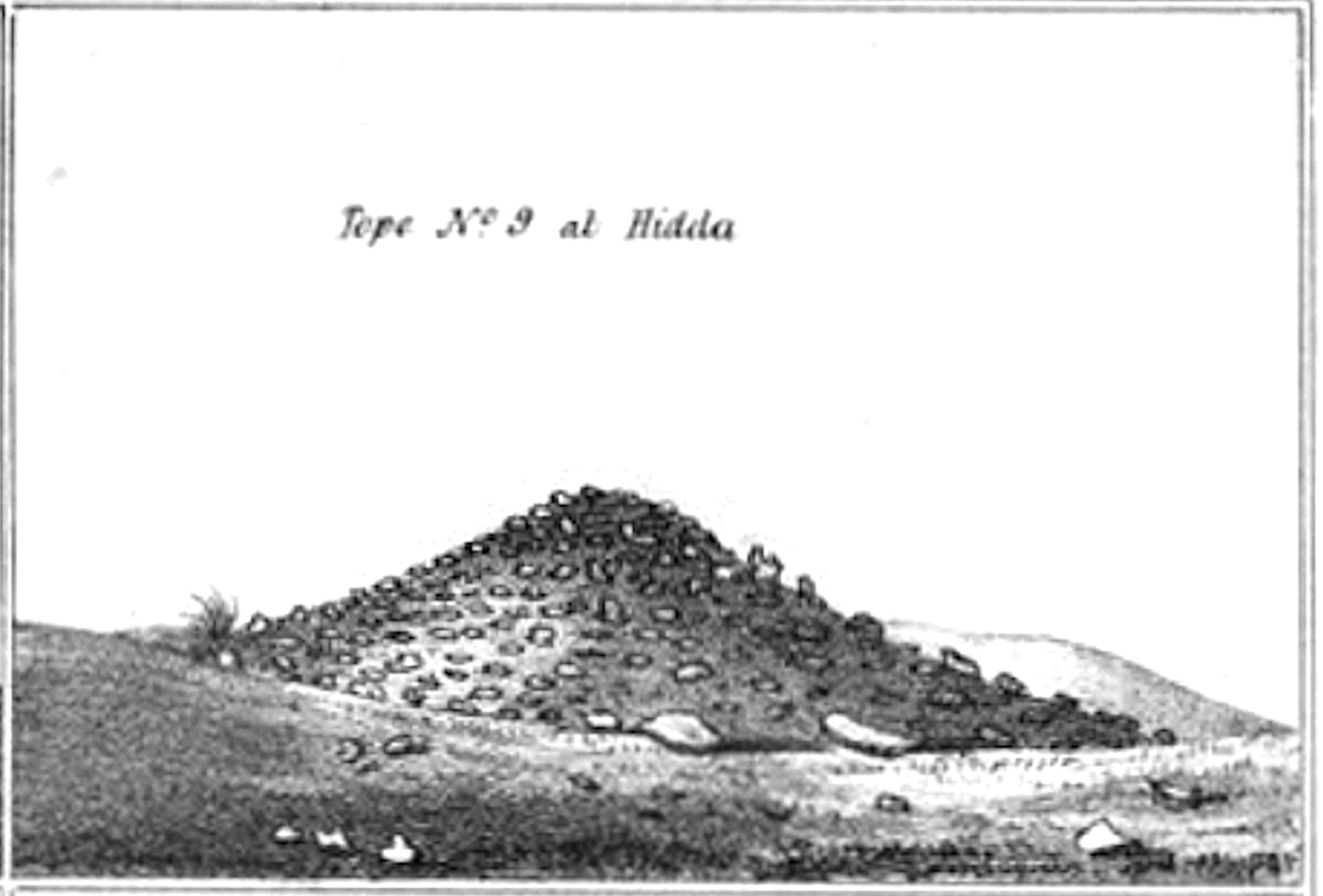
Hadda number 9, Tepe Kafariha, by Charles Masson, 1842.

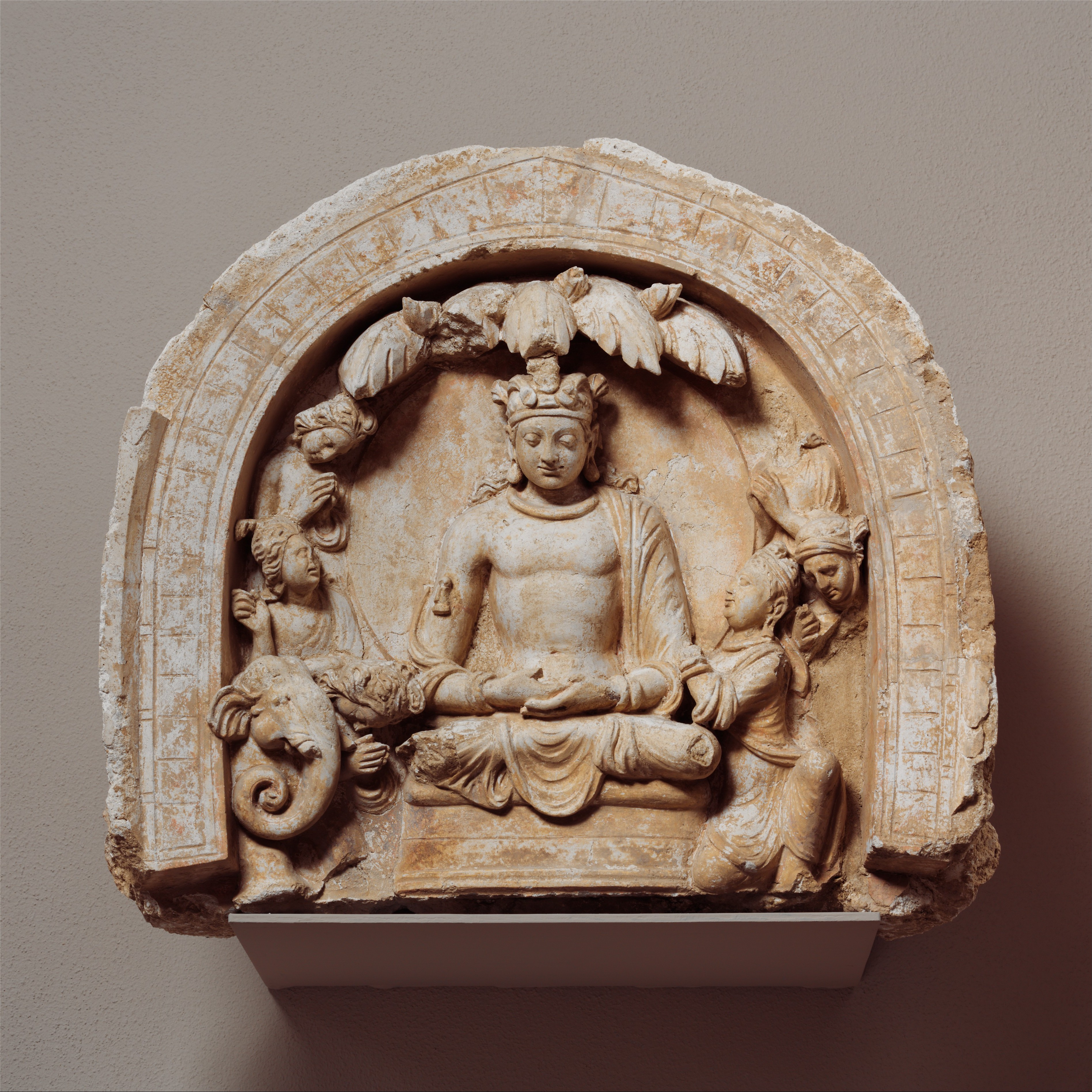
Niche with the seated Boddhisatva Shakyamuni, Tapa-i Kafariha. Metropolitan Museum of Art.

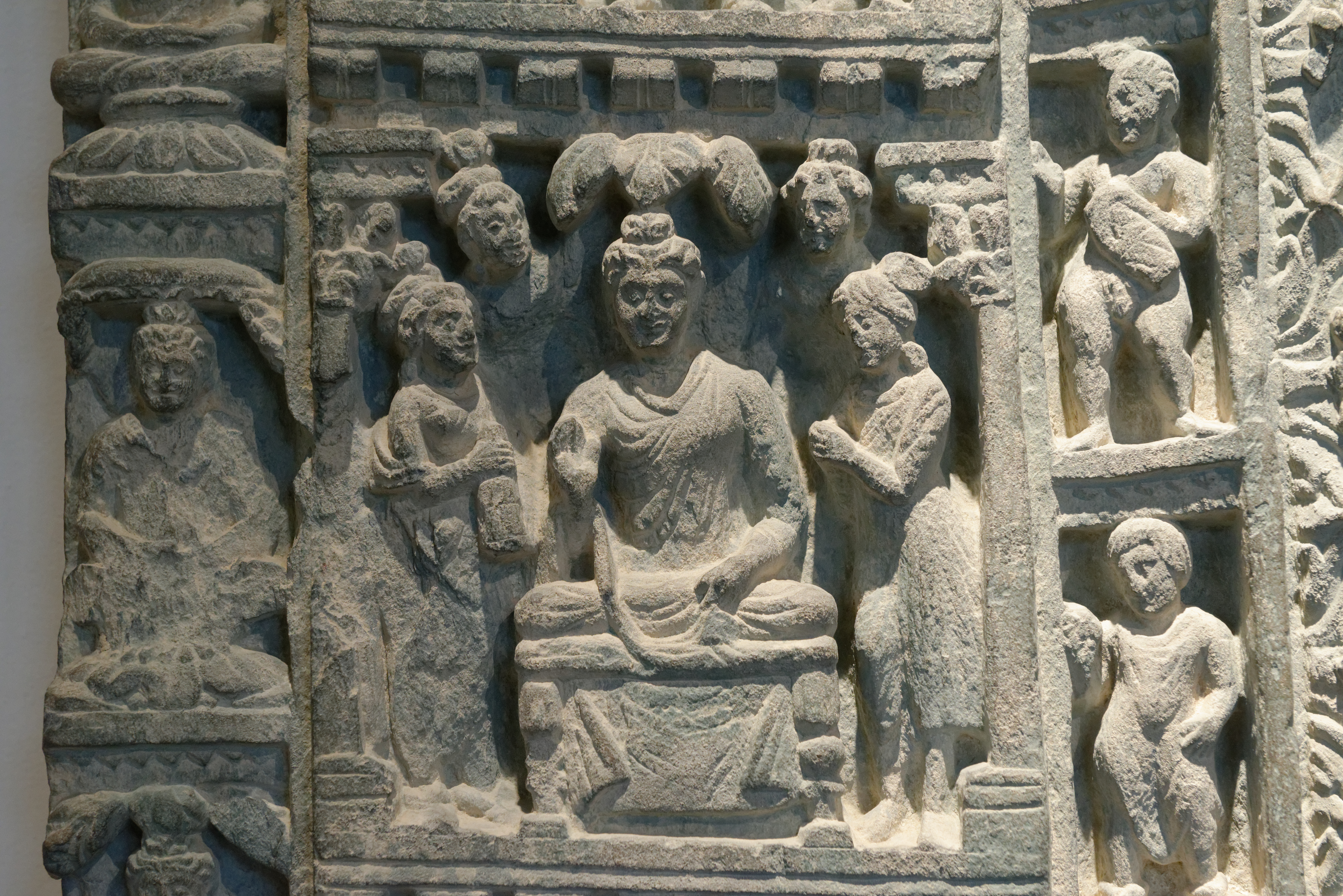
Door casing: Life of the Buddha. Musée Guimet

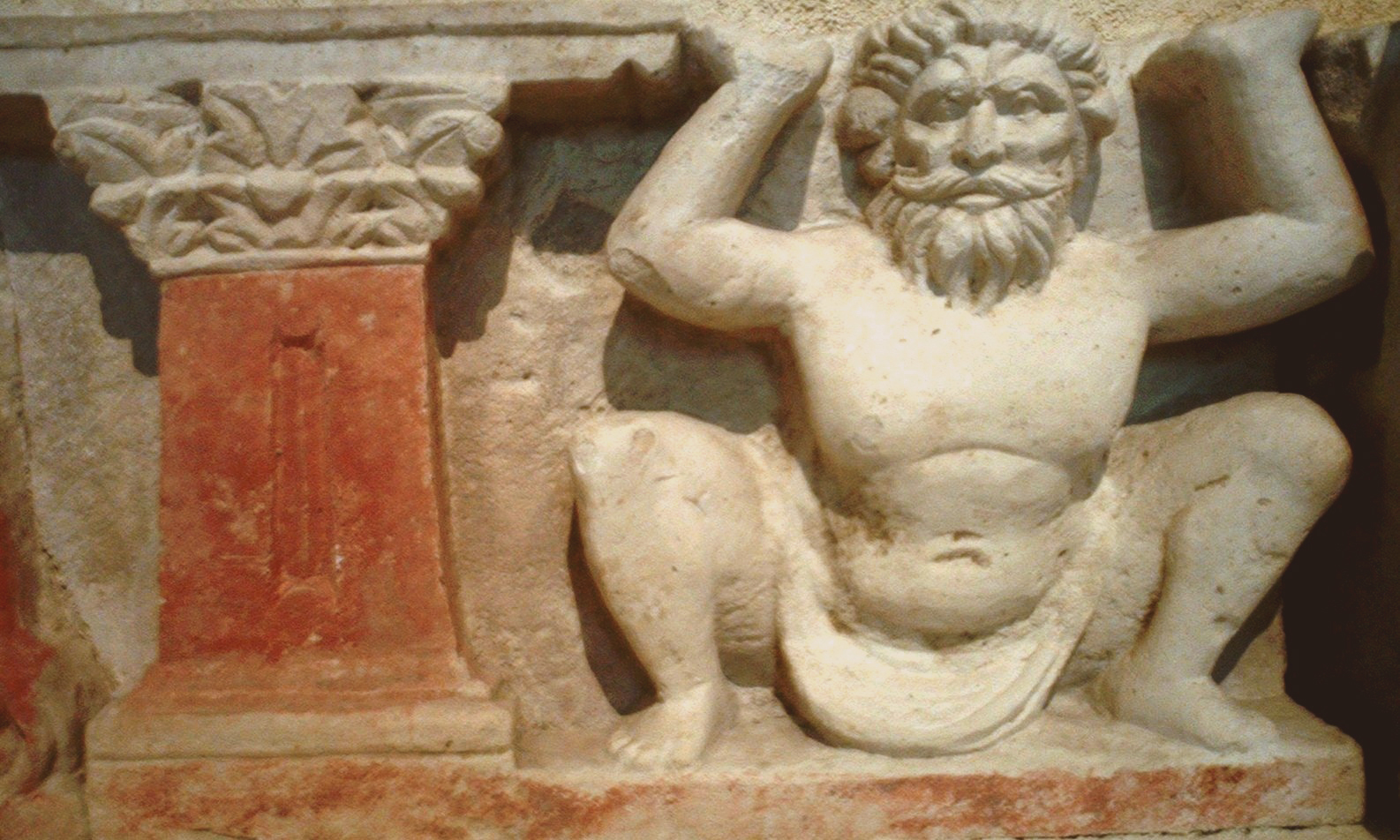
Atlas, on the base of a stupa, Tapa-i Kafariha.

== Tapa Tope Kalān monastery (5th century CE) ==
This large stupa is about 200 meters to the northeast of the modern city of Hadda. Masson called it "Tope Kalān" (Hadda 10), Barthoux "Borj-i Kafarihā", and it is now designated as "Tapa Tope Kalān".

The stupa at Tope Kalan contained deposits of over 200 mainly silver coins, dating to the 4th-5th century CE. The coins included Sasanian issues of Varhran IV (388–399 CE), Yazdagird II (438–457 CE) and Peroz I (457/9–84 CE). There were also five Roman gold solidi: Theodosius II (408–50 CE), Marcianus (450–457 CE) and Leo I (457–474 CE). Many coins were also Hunnic imitations of Sasanian coins with the addition of the Alkhon tamgha, and 14 Alkhon coins with rulers showing of their characteristic elongated skulls. All these coins point to a mid-late 5th century date for the stupa.

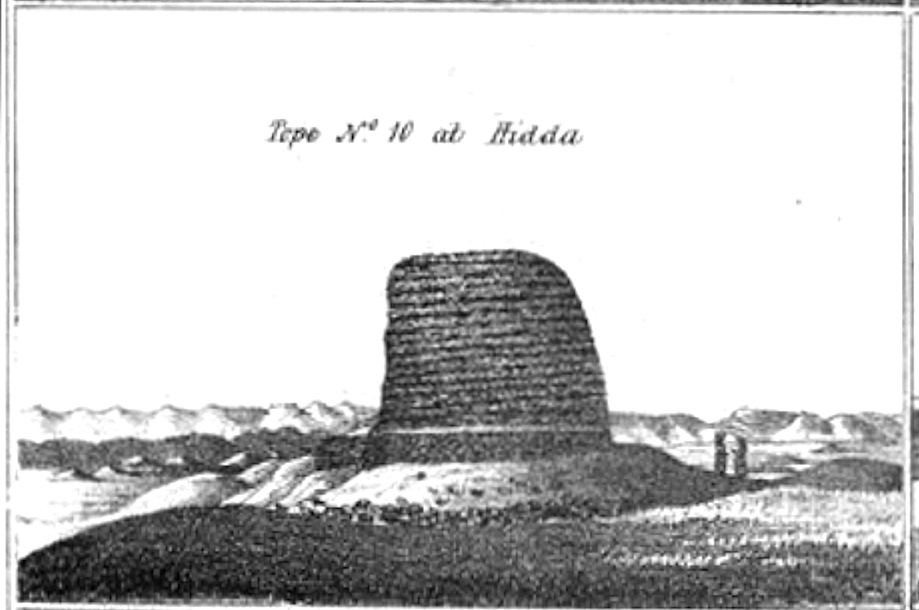
Ruins of the stupa (Hadda 10)

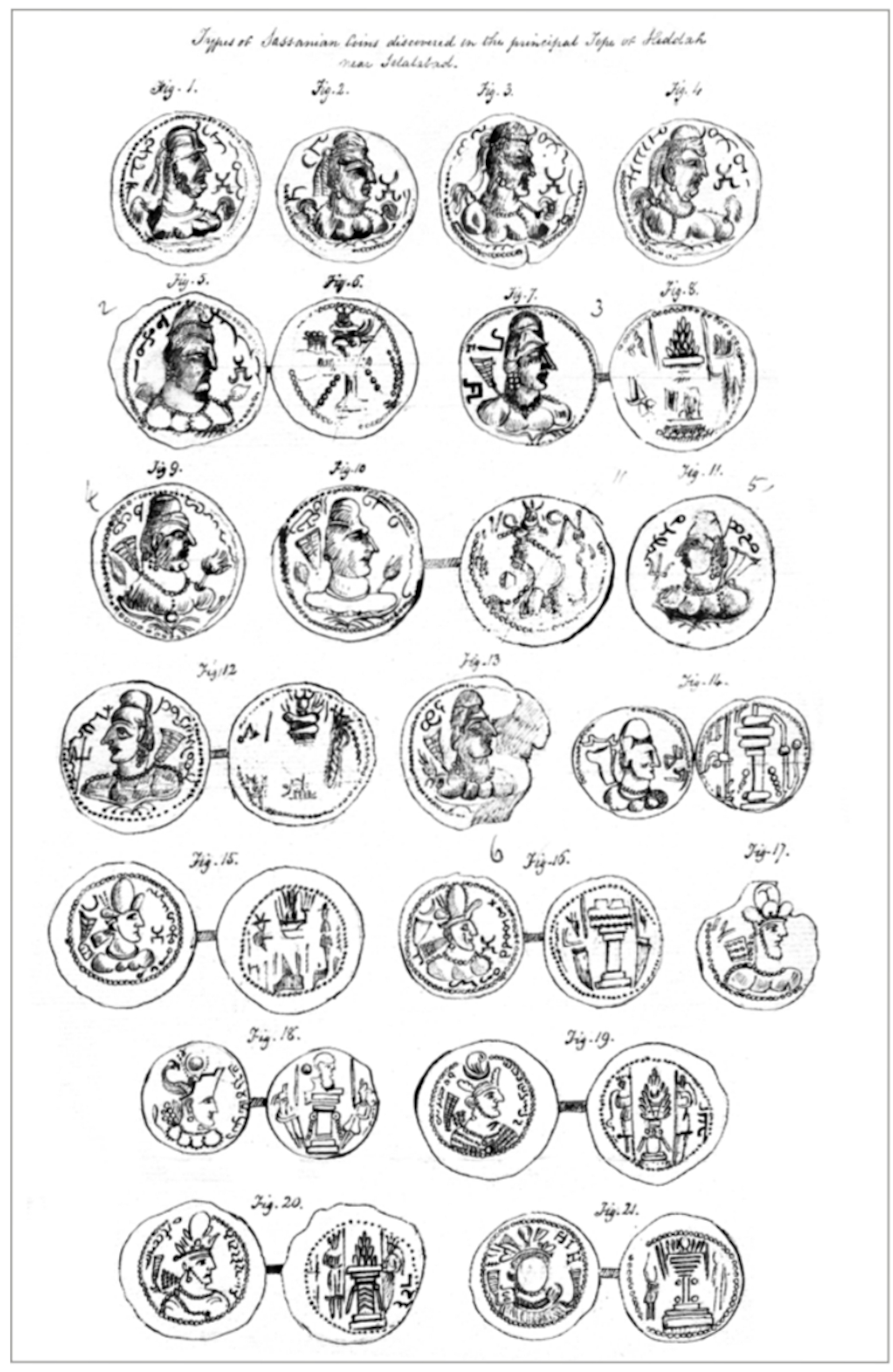
Alchon Hun, Sassanian and Kidarite coins from Tapa Kalan (Hadda 10)

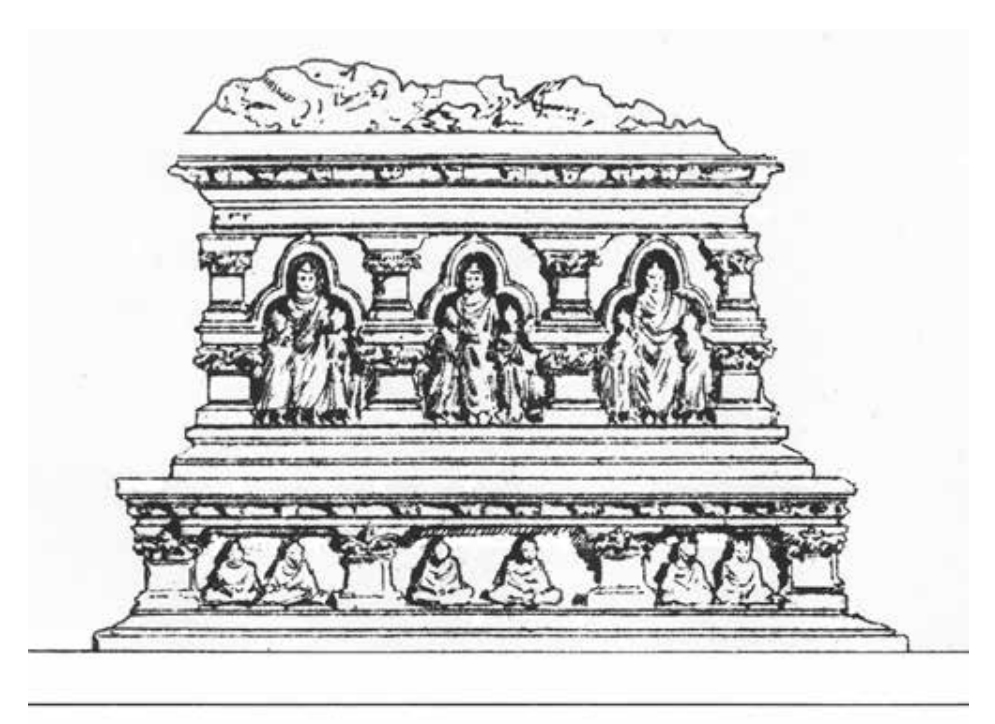
Small decorative stupa at Hadda 10

== Gallery ==
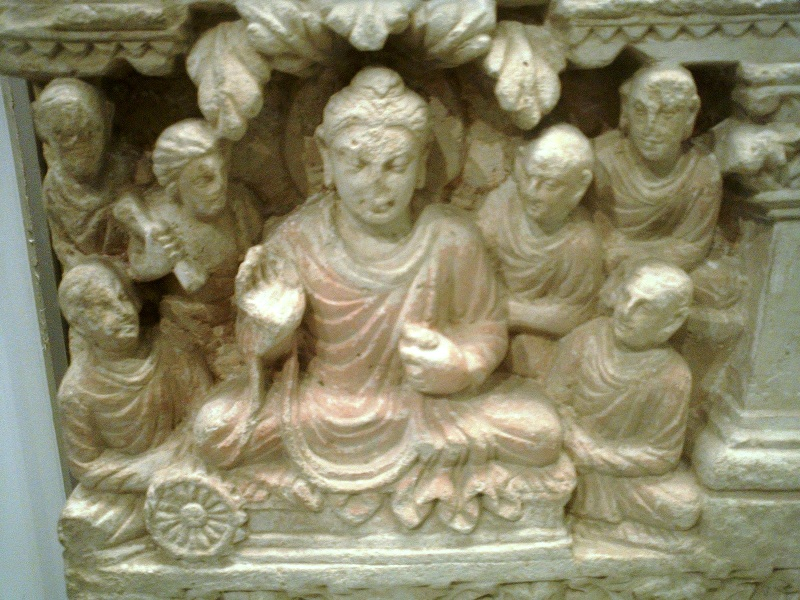
Polychrome Buddha, 2nd century CE, Hadda.

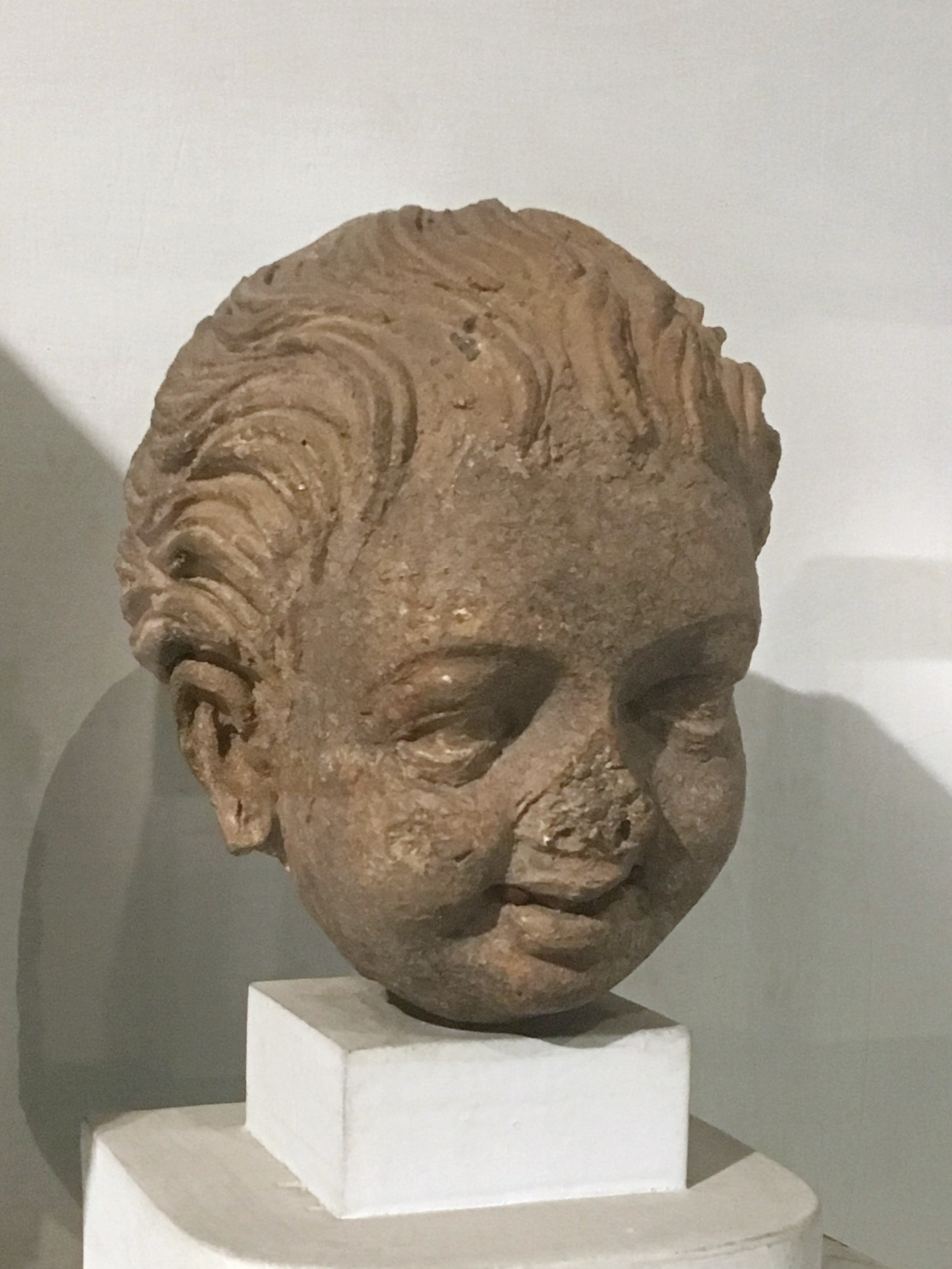
"Laughing boy" from Hadda.

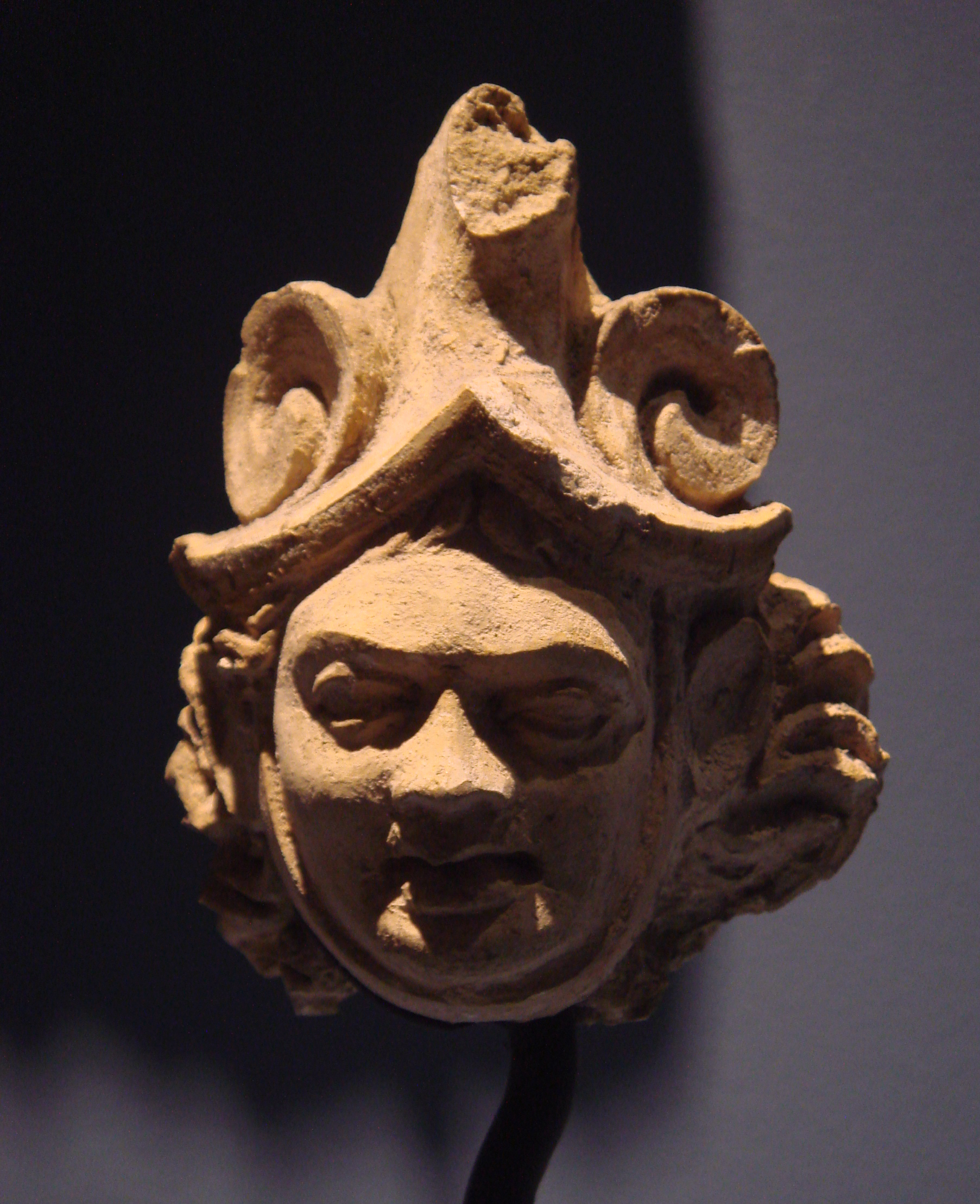
Man with helmet, Tapa Kalan, Hadda, 3rd-4th century CE

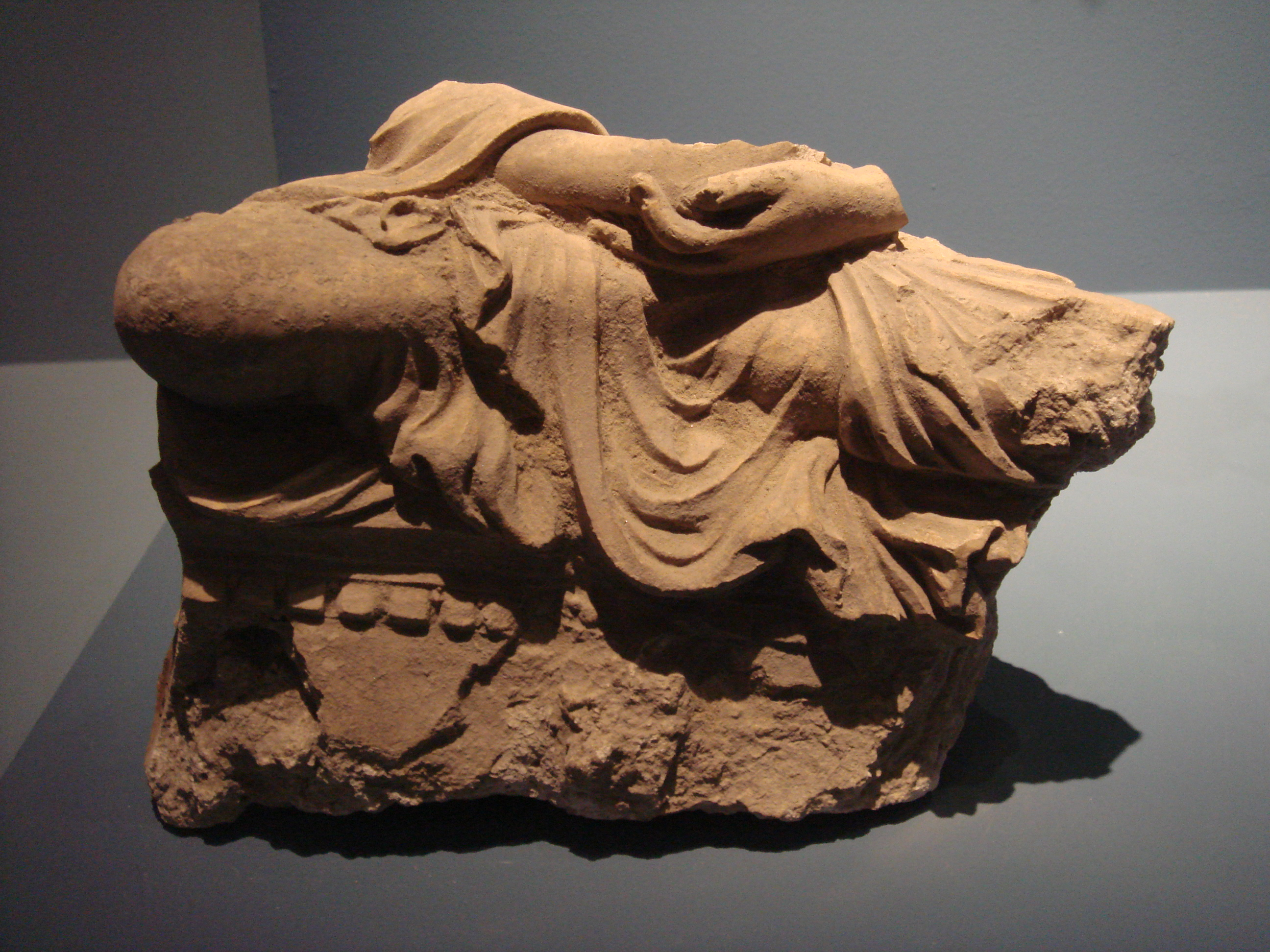
Hadda Buddha fragment, 3rd-4th century CE

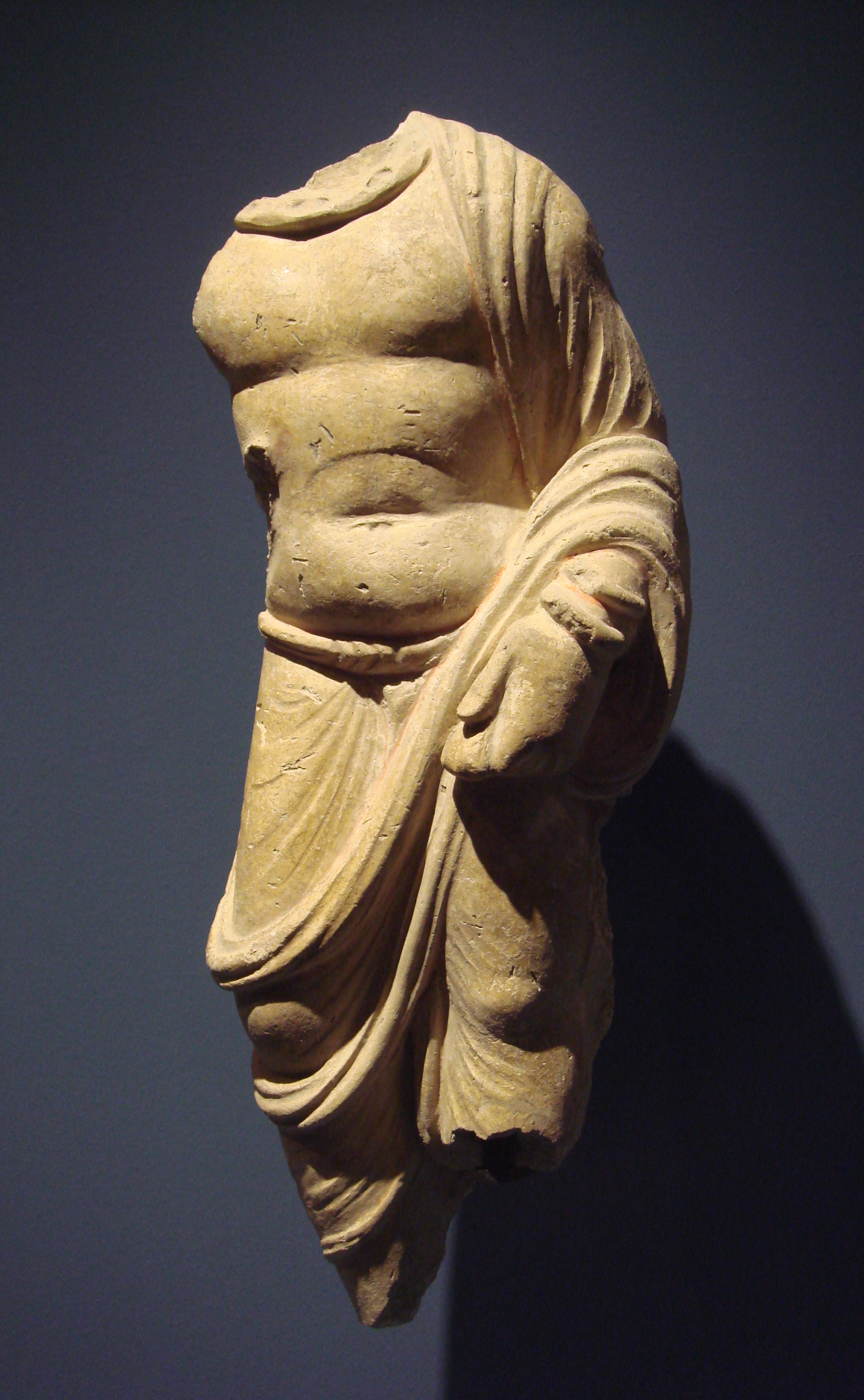
Hadda statue, 3-4th century CE

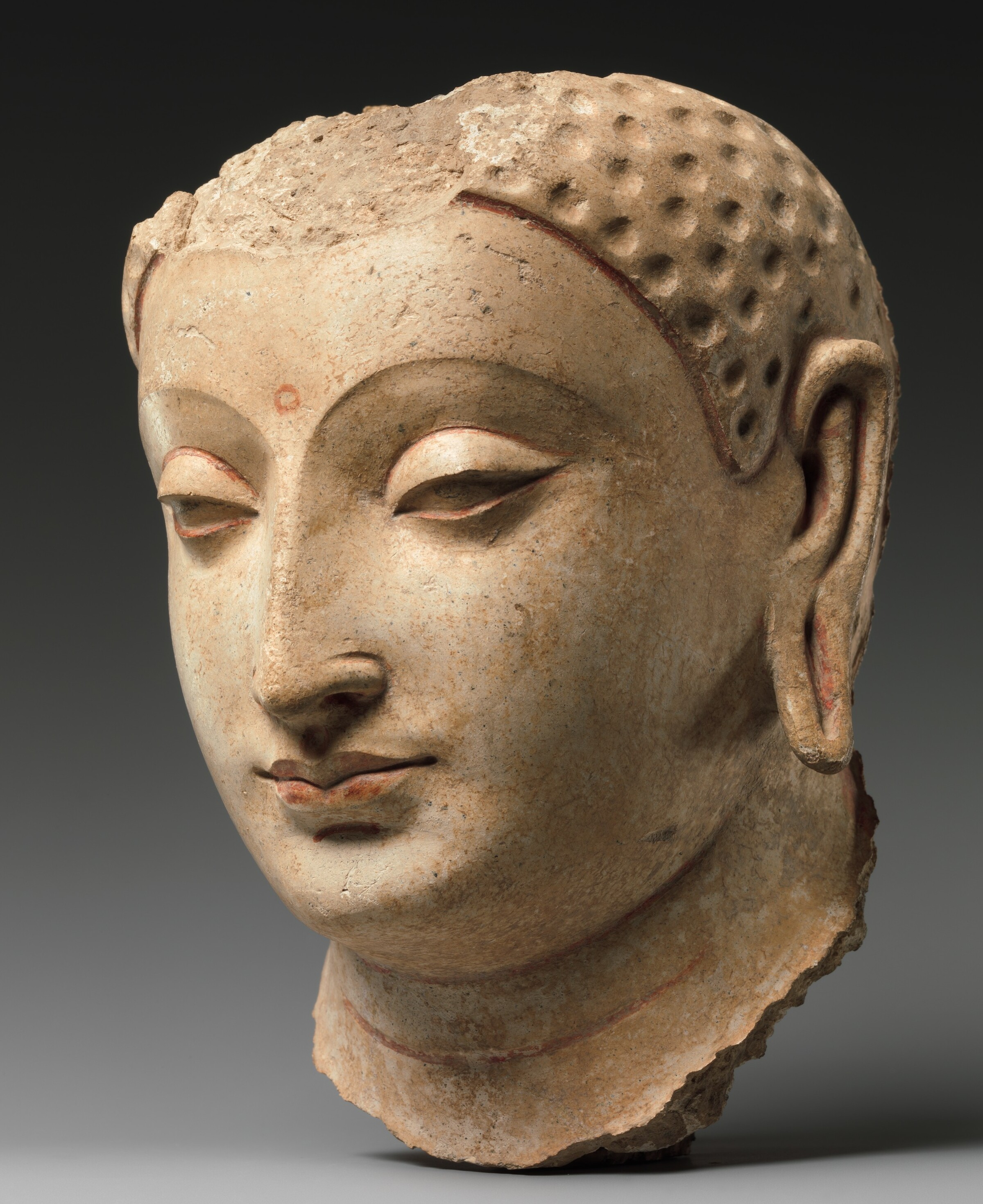
Head of Buddha, probably from Hadda, ca. 5th–6th century. Metropolitan Museum of Art.

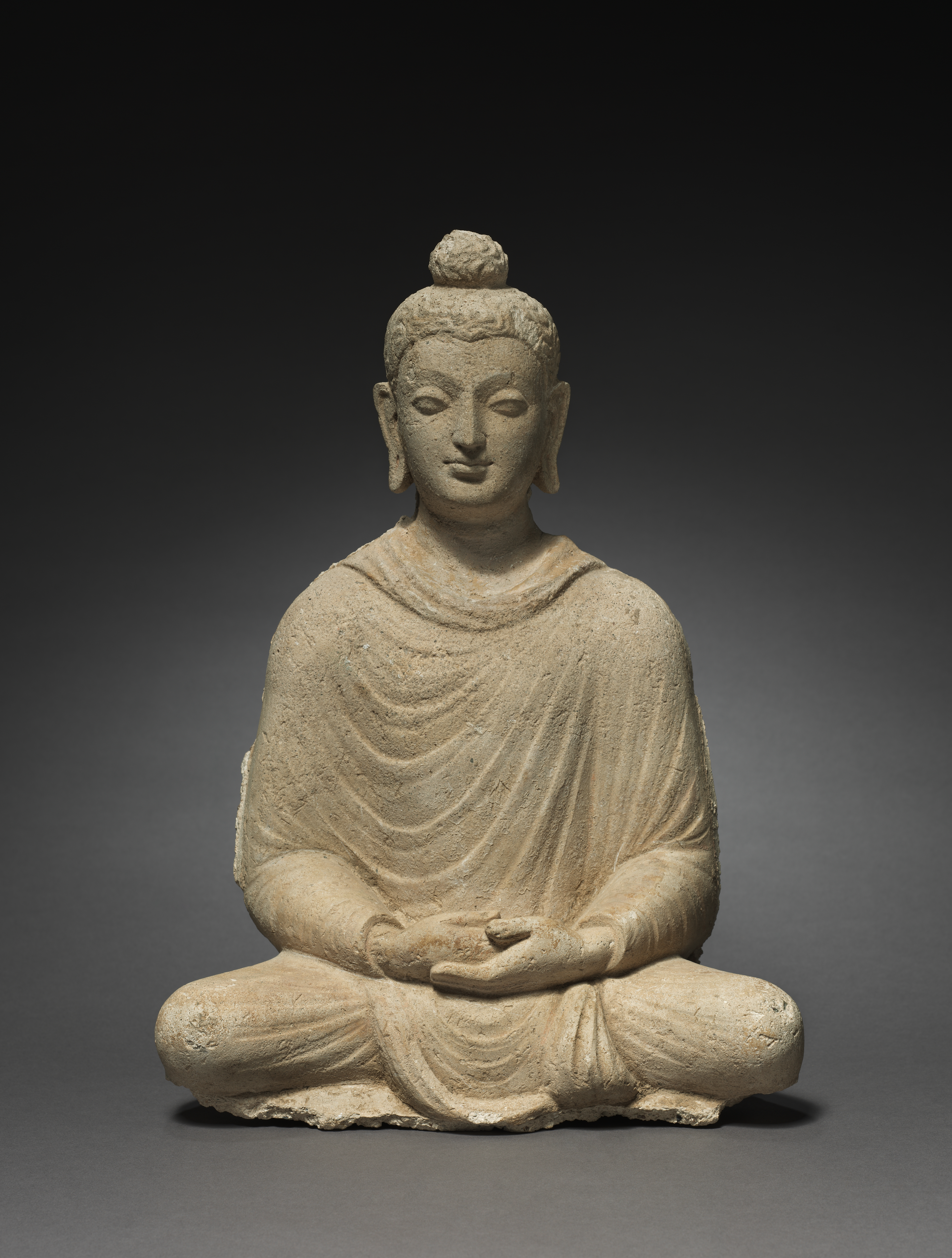
Seated Buddha
