= Ai-Khanoum plaque =

Ancient plaque

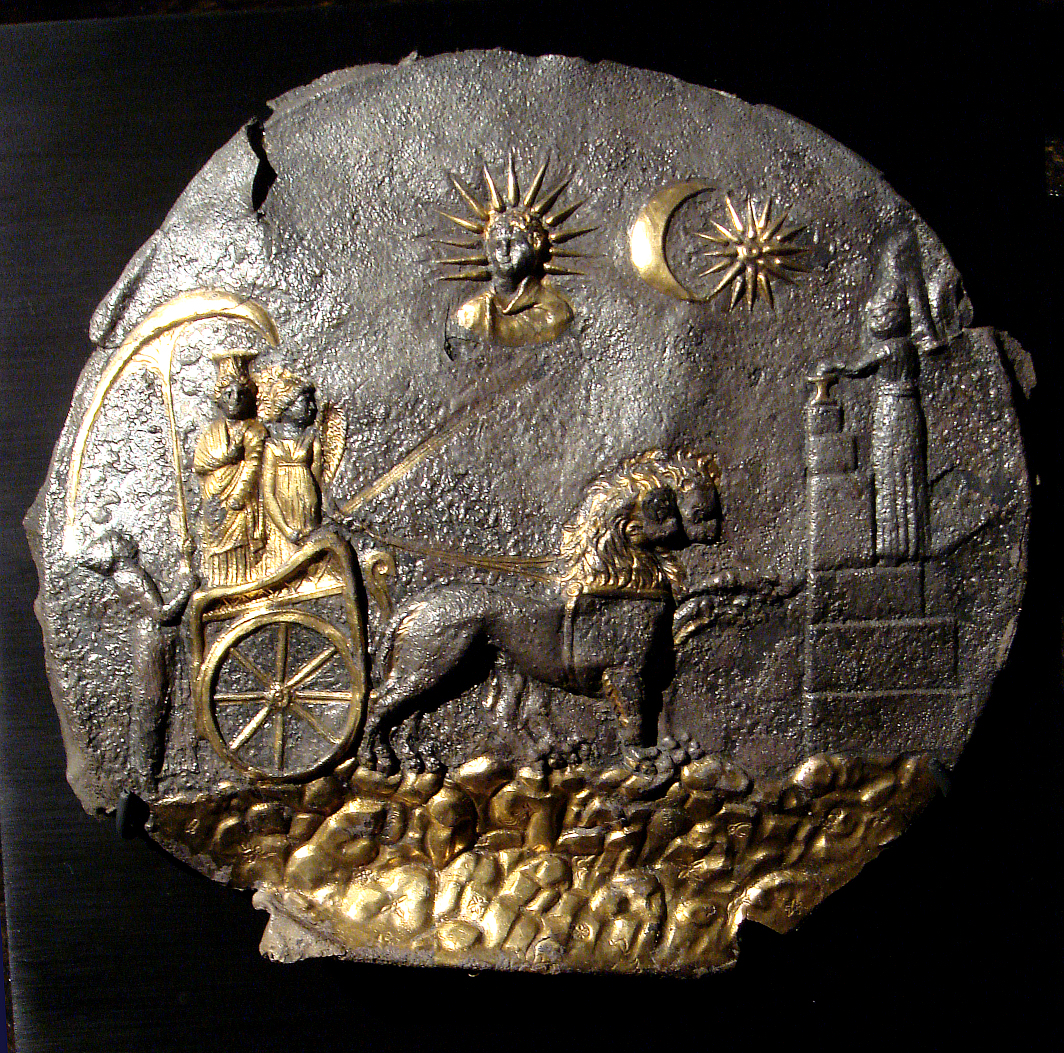
The ancient Seleucid disk found at Ai-Khanoum

The Ay-Khanoum plaque is an ancient Greco-Bactrian disk discovered at the archaeological site of Ay-Khanoum in Takhar Province, Afghanistan. This Hellenistic city served as a military and economic center for the rulers of the Greco-Bactrian Kingdom until its destruction c. 145 BC. Rediscovered in 1961, the ruins of the city were excavated by the French Archaeological Delegation in Afghanistan (DAFA) until an outbreak of conflict in Afghanistan during the late 1970s. Among the structures excavated by the archaeologists was a sanctuary called the 'Temple of Indented Niches', (French: "temple à niches indentées"; alternatively "temple à redans", meaning 'Stepped Temple') in which the disk was found. The disk is held in the collection of the National Museum of Afghanistan in Kabul.

This disk, depicting the Greek goddess Nike driving a chariot drawn by lions and accompanied by the Greek goddess Cybele, was described as "remarkable" by the Metropolitan Museum of Art on account of its "hybrid Greek and Oriental imagery". Made of silver, the disk combines components of Greek culture, such as the chlamys all the deities wear, with Oriental design motifs such as the fixed pose of the figures and the crescent moon. It has been described as "the most important work [of] the Greco-Oriental style".

== Details ==
The disk was excavated from one of the southern storage rooms of the Temple of Indented Niches during the 1969 DAFA excavation campaign. It had been hidden between the bases of two large jars against a wall. It is made of silver, and engraved with gold details: a figure normally identified as the Greek deity Cybele traverses a rocky landscape in a chariot pulled by lions and guided by a winged goddess of Victory; meanwhile, one priest holds a parasol over Cybele, while another burns incense upon a stepped Oriental altar towards which the chariot travels. Above these figures are shown the Sun as Helios, the Moon, and a star.

The disk has been attested as an example of a blended Hellenistic and Oriental artistic style. DAFA's lead archaeologist Paul Bernard noted that the iconographic elements—the representations of Victory and Helios, and the robes of the goddesses—were predominantly Greek in origin. However, the image displays no sense of perspective, with the characters displayed either in profile or head-on, which derives from Oriental tradition. However, some aspects of the disk have been disputed, especially with regard to what it shows about Ai-Khanoum's religion. Claude Rapin believed that the disk in fact showed the Egyptian goddess Isis, not a Victory, while Henri-Paul Francfort theorised that the disk displayed an actual religious event in the city.

== Sources ==
- Bernard, Paul (1970). Campagne de fouilles 1969 à Aï Khanoum en Afghanistan [1969 excavation campaign at Aï Khanoum in Afghanistan] (Report). DAFA.
- Bernard, Paul (1982). "An Ancient Greek City in Central Asia". Scientific American. No. 246. pp. 148–159. JSTOR 24966505.
- Bernard, Paul (1996). "The Greek Kingdoms of Central Asia" (PDF). In Harmatta, János (ed.). History of civilizations of Central Asia. Vol. 2. Paris: UNESCO. ISBN 9789231028465.
- Francfort, Henri-Paul (2012). "Ai Khanoum 'Temple with Indented Niches' and Takht-i Sangin 'Oxus Temple' in Historical Cultural Perspective: Outline of a Hypothesis about the Cults". Parthica (14). Pisa: 109–136.
- Francfort, Henri-Paul; Grenet, Frantz; Lecuyot, Guy; Martinez-Sève, Laurianne; Rapin, Claude; Lyonnet, Bertille, eds. (2014). Il y a 50 ans ... la découverte d'Aï Khanoum: 1964–1978, fouilles de la Délégation archéologique française en Afghanistan (DAFA) [50 years ago ... the discovery of Aï Khanoum: the 1964–1978 excavations by the French Archaeological Delegation in Afghanistan (DAFA)] (in French). Vol. 35. Paris: Editions de Boccard. ISBN 9782701804194. JSTOR j.ctt1b7x71z.
- Mairs, Rachel (2013). "The 'Temple with Indented Niches' at Ai Khanoum: Ethnic and Civic Identity in Hellenistic Bactria". In Alston, Richard; van Nijf, Onno; Williamson, Christina (eds.). Cults, Creeds and Identities in the Greek City after the Classical Age. Leuven: Peeters Publishers. ISBN 978-9042927148.
- Rapin, Claude (1990). "Greeks in Afghanistan: Ai Khanum". In Descœudres, Jean-Paul (ed.). Greek Colonists and Native Populations: Proceedings of the First Australian Congress of Classical Archaeology. Oxford: Clarendon Press. pp. 329–342. ISBN 978-0-19-814869-2. Archived from the original on 2024-07-21.
