= Hackin =

Hackin is a surname. Notable people with the surname include:

- Joseph Hackin (1886-1941), French archaeologist and Resistance member, husband of Marie
- Marie Hackin (1905-1941), French archaeologist and Resistance member, wife of Joseph
- Dennis Hackin, American writer of films including Bronco Billy
