= Claude Rapin =

Archaeologist and historian

- Education: University of Lausanne
- Occupation: Archaeologist
- Website: claude.rapin.free.fr

Claude Rapin (born 19??) is an archaeologist and historian specializing in Central Asia, with special attention to Afghanistan and Uzbekistan. He is director emeritus for research at the Centre national de la recherche scientifique (CNRS) and is associated with the Mission archéologique franco-ouzbèke de Sogdiane ("Franco-Uzbek Archaeological Mission of Sogdiana").

== Career ==
Rapin studied archaeology, ancient history and Greek language at the University of Lausanne, where he obtained the degree of Doctor of Letters by writing a thesis on the royal treasury of the Hellenistic palace at Ai-Khanoum in Afghanistan, under the direction of Paul Bernard.

After a period of archaeological excavations in Europe (Great Britain, Romania and Switzerland), he began to concentrate his field activities on Central Asia, first in Afghanistan, then in Uzbekistan. He has participated in the excavations of Samarkand, Koktepe and the Sogdian Iron Gate (Central Asia) relating to activities of the Franco-Uzbek Archaeological Mission of Sogdiana.

Since 1995, he has been a research fellow of the Hellénisme et civilisations orientales team at CNRS in Paris; and gave courses on Central Asian archaeology as a privat-docent at University of Lausanne.

== Selected publications ==
Articles

- Greeks in Afghanistan: Aï Khanum, 1990
- Nomads and the Shaping of Central Asia: From the Early Iron Age to the Kushan period, 2007
- With Svetlana Gorshenina, "Hellenism with or without Alexander the Great: Russian, Soviet and Central Asian approaches", article published in The Graeco-Bactrian and Indo-Greek World, edited by Rachel Mairs. Milton Park: Routledge, 2021.

Books

- Fouilles d'Aï Khanoum VIII : La Trésorerie du palais hellénistique d'Aï Khanoum, Éditions de Boccard, 1992
- Indian Art from Afghanistan: The Legend of Śakuntalā and the Indian Treasure of Eucratides at Ai Khanum, Manohar Publishers, 1996
- With Svetlana Gorshenina, De Kaboul à Samarcande : Les archéologues en Asie centrale, coll. « Découvertes Gallimard » (nº 411), série Archéologie. Éditions Gallimard, 2001
- Samarcande : Cité mythique au coeur de l'Asie, coll. « Dossiers d'Archéologie » (nº 341). Éditions Faton, 2010

== See also ==
- Central Asian studies
