= Svetlana Gorshenina =

Uzbek-French historian

- Born: Svetlana Michaïlovna Gorshenina; 1969 (age 56–57)
- Occupations: Historian, art historian of Central Asia
- Website: www.svetlana-gorshenina.net

Svetlana Gorshenina (also spelt Svetlana Goršenina; born Svetlana Michaïlovna Gorshenina) is a Soviet-born Swiss historian, art historian, historiographer and specialist on Central Asia, mainly involved in the history of Turkestan of the nineteenth to the early twentieth century and the early years of Soviet rule in the region. She is Research Professor, EUR'ORBEM (CNRS — CNRS/Sorbonne Université, UMR 8224, Paris). Her works appear mostly in French language.

== Career ==
A graduate of the Tashkent State University, Svetlana Gorshenina defended her first PhD thesis in 1996 under the direction of Galina Pugachenkova and Valery Germanov at the Institute of History of the Academy of Sciences of Uzbekistan. Then she has a second doctorate in 2007 at the Universities of Lausanne and Paris I-Sorbonne (under the direction of Henri-Paul Francfort and Patrick Sériot), and finally, in 2016, a habilitation on the cultural heritage of Turkestan at the Institute of Oriental Languages and Civilizations (INALCO, Paris).

Svetlana Gorshenina has been a researcher at the Institute of Fine Arts and Institute of History of the Academy of Sciences of Uzbekistan, and at the University of Tashkent. Later she has worked as a researcher and/or lecturer at the Collège de France (Frantz Grenet’s Departement, Paris), the École normale supérieure - ENS ("Hellenisms of Asia and Oriental Civilisations", Paris), the School for Advanced Studies in the Social Sciences - EHESS (Paris) and the University of Lausanne and University of Manchester (grant of the Swiss National Science Foundation). She was also Director of the "Central Asia Programme” of the Réseau Asie-IMASIE (Asia-IMASIE Network).

She has curated several exhibitions of nineteenth and early twentieth century photographs and the history of Central Asian archaeology, and co-founded the international Alert Heritage Observatory.

== Selected publications ==
Monographs:

- L'invention de l'Asie centrale : Histoire du concept de la Tartarie à l'Eurasie, coll. "Rayon Histoire" (nº 4). Geneva: Droz, 2014.
- Asie centrale. L’invention des frontières et l’héritage russo-soviétique, Paris: CNRS-Éditions, 2012.
- The Private Collections of Russian Turkestan in the 2nd Half of the 19th and Early 20th Century, Berlin: Klaus Schwarz Verlag, 2004.
- Explorateurs en Asie centrale : Voyageurs et aventuriers de Marco Polo à Ella Maillart, Geneva: Olizane, 2003.
- La route de Samarcande : l'Asie centrale dans l'objectif des voyageurs d'autrefois, Geneva: Olizane, 2000.

Collaborative works:

- With Claude Rapin, De Kaboul à Samarcande : Les archéologues en Asie centrale, coll. « Découvertes Gallimard » (nº 411), série Archéologie. Paris: Gallimard, 2001.
- With Aymon Baud and Philippe Forêt, La Haute-Asie telle qu'ils l'ont vue : Explorateurs et scientifiques de 1820 à 1940, Geneva: Olizane, 2003.
- With Claude Rapin, "Hellenism with or without Alexander the Great: Russian, Soviet and Central Asian approaches", article published in The Graeco-Bactrian and Indo-Greek World, edited by Rachel Mairs. Milton Park: Routledge, 2021.

Edited Volumes:

- Svetlana Gorshenina, Philippe Bornet, Michel Fuchs et Claude Rapin (éd.), “Masters” and “Natives”: Digging the Others’ Past, Berlin: De Gruyter Mouton, Serie: Welten Süd- und Zentralasiens / Worlds of South and Inner Asia / Mondes de l’Asie du Sud et de l’Asie Centrale, 2019.
- Michel Espagne, Svetlana Gorshenina, Frantz Grenet, Shahin Mustafayev, Claude Rapin (éd.), Asie centrale : transferts culturels le long de la Route de la soie, Paris: Vendémiaire, 2016.
- Philippe Bornet, Svetlana Gorshenina, Orientalismes des marges: Éclairages à partir de l’Inde et de la Russie, Lausanne: Université de Lausanne, numéro spécial d’Études de Lettres, n° 2-3 (vol. 296), 2014.
- Svetlana Gorshenina et Sergej Abashin (éd.), Le Turkestan russe: une colonie comme les autres ?, Paris: Complexe, Collection de l’IFÉAC - Cahiers d’Asie centrale, n° 17 / 18, 2009.

== See also ==
- Central Asian studies
- Ubaydulla Uvatov
