= Marie Hackin =

French archaeologist and resistance fighter (1905–1941)

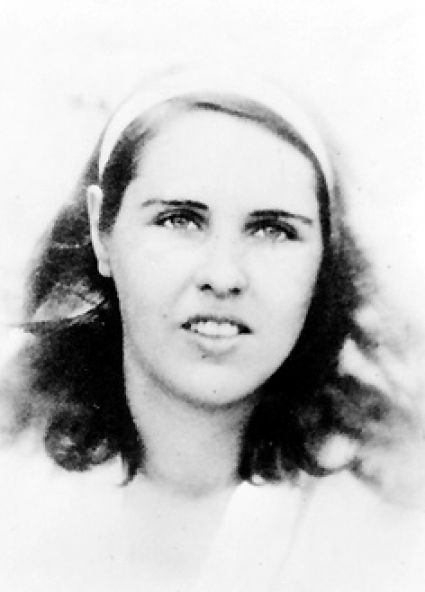
- Born: 7 September 1905; Rombas, Alsace-Lorraine
- Died: 24 February 1941 (aged 35) near Faroe Islands
- Known for: excavations at Bamyan and Bagram
- Scientific career
- Fields: archaeology

Marie Parmentier, married name Marie Hackin, (1905-1941) was an archaeologist and Resistance member who worked with her husband Joseph Hackin, who also was an archaeologist, philologist, and Resistance member. She was a posthumous recipient of the Compagnon de la Libération; one of only six women to receive France's second highest honour.

== Biography ==
Marie Hackin's father was from Luxembourg. In September 1928, she married Joseph Hackin, a French archaeologist and then the curator at the Guimet Museum. She studied at the École du Louvre. With her husband, she worked with the French Archaeological Delegation in Afghanistan in 1929 to 1930, 1934 to 1935, and 1936 to 1937. She directed the excavation at Begram which resulted in the discovery of the Treasure of Begram. In 1937, she filmed archaeological sites and the landscape of Afghanistan; she turned this in to a mixed black and white and colour documentary film that she put on in Luxembourg on 14 November 1938.

In September 1939, with the outbreak of the Second World War, her husband Joseph Hackin was mobilised. The couple returned to Europe, traveling to London in October 1940. She joined the Corps des Volontaires françaises, part of the Free French forces, with the first batch of volunteers and became one of three female officers. She received training through a British Officer Cadet Training Unit.

She died in 1941 when she was in a sea convoy trying to go from Liverpool into the Atlantic Ocean en route to Africa, when the ship was sunk by a German submarine. She and her husband had been sent on a mission to Asia.

She was awarded the Croix de Guerre 1939–1945 with palm, the 1939–1945 Commemorative war medal, in addition to being appointed Compagnon de la Libération (Companion of the Liberation) on 13 May 1941.

== Selected works ==
- with Joseph Hackin: Le site archéologiques de Bamyan. Guide du visiteur. Les édition d'art et d'histoire, Paris 1934.
  - German: Bamian. Führer zu den buddhistischen Höhlenklöstern und Kolossalstatuen. Les édition d'art et d'histoire, Paris 1939.
- with Joseph Hackin: Recherches archéologiques à Begram: chantier no. 2 (1937), Mémoires de la délégation archéologique française en Afghanistan Vol. 9. Les Éditions d'art et d'histoire, Paris 1939.
- with Ahmad Ali Kohzad: Légendes et coutumes afghanes, Publications du Musée Guimet. Bibliothèque de diffusion Vol. 60. Presses Universitaires de France, Paris 1953.
- with Joseph Hackin: Nouvelles recherches archéologiques à Begram, ancienne Kâpici, 1939–1940, Mémoires de la Délégation archéologique française en Afghanistan Vol. 11. Presses Universitaires de France, Paris 1954.

== Sources ==
- Joseph et Ria Hackin. Couple d'origine luxembourgeoise au service des arts asiatiques et de la France. Exposition organisée dans le cadre de l'Accord culturel Franco-luxembourgeois est réalisée avec le concours du Musée Guimet, Paris. Musée d'Histoire et d'Art Musées d'État – Luxembourg. Exposition du 11 novembre 1987 au 3 janvier 1988, Luxembourg. Musée d'Histoire et d'Art, Luxemburg 1987.
- Marie Hackin. In: Vladimir Trouplin: Dictionnaire des Compagnons de la Libération. Bordeaux, Elytis 2010, ISBN 978-2-35639-033-2 (Digital).
