= Joseph Hackin =

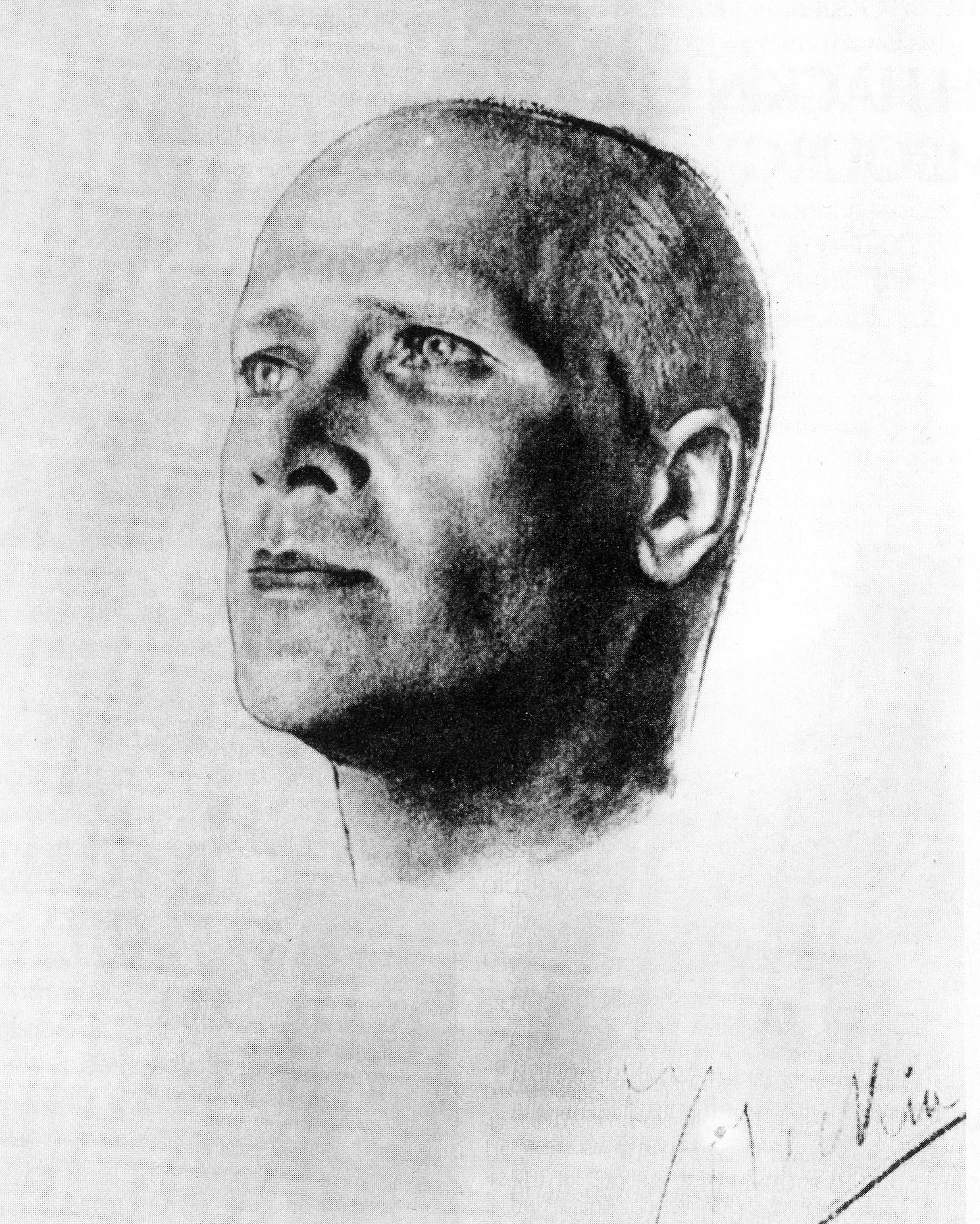
1932 portrait of Joseph Hackin by Alexandre Jacovleff.

Joseph Hackin (8 November 1886, Boevange-sur-Attert – 24 February 1941) was a French archaeologist and Resistance member. He was a curator at the Musée Guimet and explored Afghanistan in 1923 with Alfred Foucher and Andre Godard.

== Biography ==
Born in Luxembourg, he graduated from the Ecole libre des sciences politiques and the École des langues orientales, Paris. He acquired French nationality in 1912. Initially, he was an assistant curator of the Musée Guimet and later became the curator.

In 1931, he participated in the Yellow Expedition. After several archaeological missions in Afghanistan, he was appointed director of the Délégation archéologique française en Afghanistan in 1934.

During the excavations conducted by Hackin and his team in Begram, between 1937 and 1940, an exceptional treasure of the Kushan period (1st–2nd century A.D.) was unearthed. It included a large number of Roman bronze, alabaster, Syrian glass, coins, Chinese lacquer bowls, and the famous "Begram ivories".

In October 1940, with his wife, Marie Hackin, he joined the Free French Forces in London. He was appointed as the personal representative of General de Gaulle in India and surrounding countries. He perished with his wife when their transport ship, "Jonathan Holt", was sunk by a German torpedo near the Faroe Islands, 24 February 1941.

== Decorations ==
- Croix de Guerre 1914-1918
- Chevalier de la Légion d'Honneur
- Compagnon de la Libération
