= Eucratideia =

Possibly legendary ancient town in Bactria

Eucratideia (Greek: Εὐκρατίδεια) was an ancient town in Bactria mentioned by a few ancient writers. It was most likely a foundation of Eucratides I who is the more important ruler of the Greco-Bactrian Kingdom with the name Eucratides. Not much is known about this city and it might be just a renaming of an already existing town rather than a new foundation. Renaming of cities was a common practise in the ancient world. The most likely candidate is Ai-Khanoum, although Dilbarjin is another candidate.
