= Koktepe =

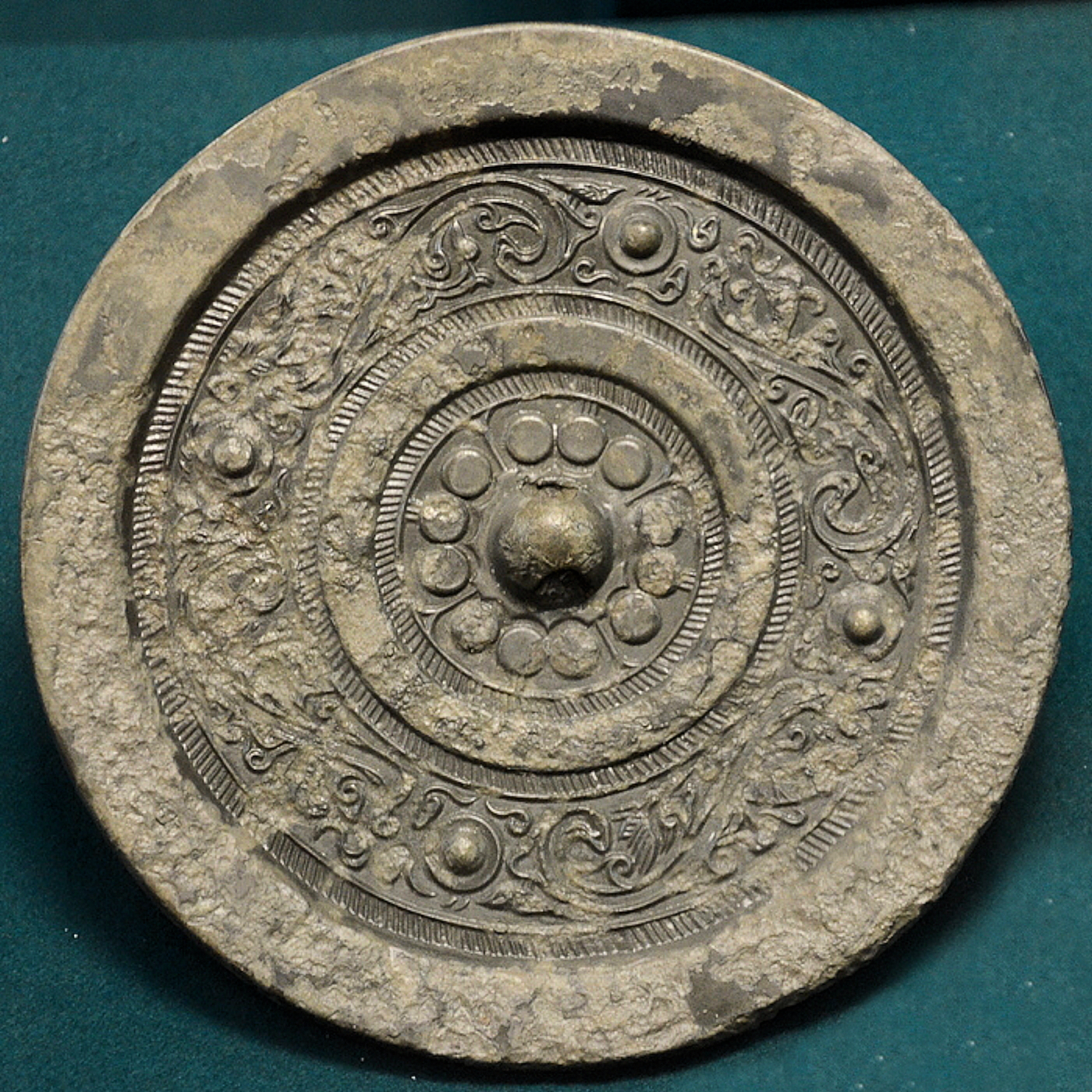
- Chinese mirror from the Koktepe tomb, 200 BCE- 1 BCE.

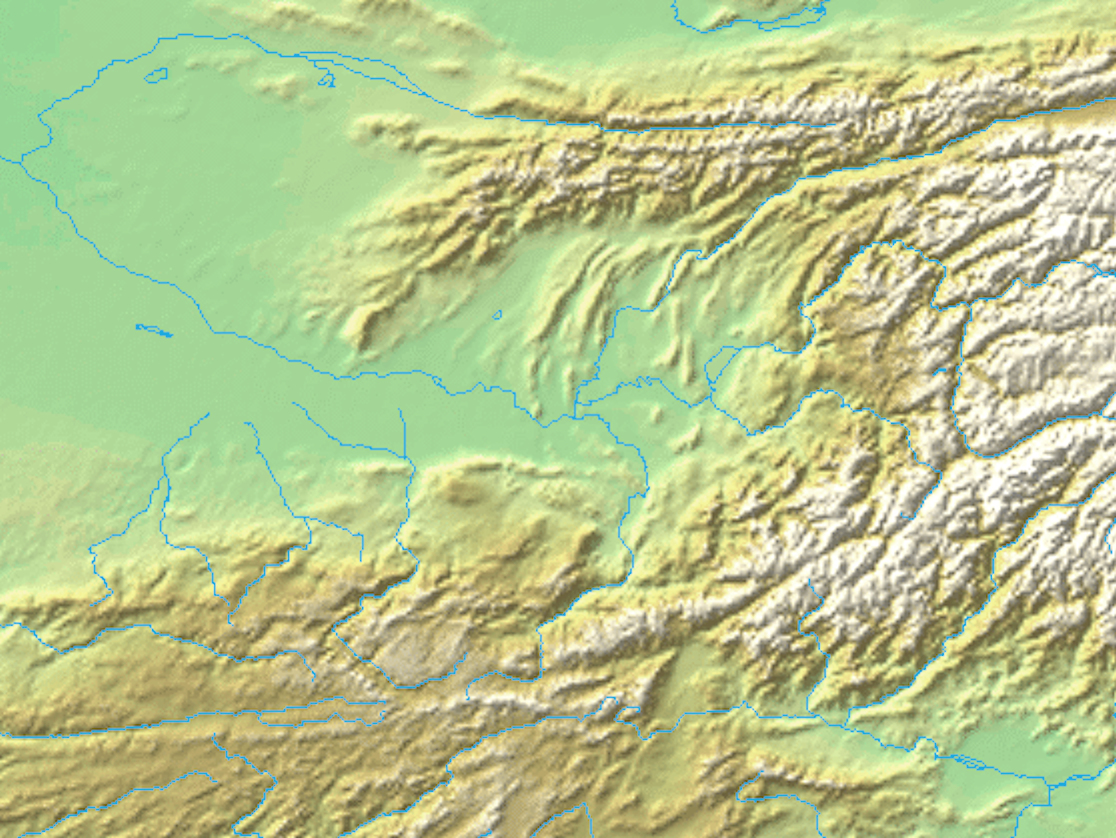
- Location within West and Central Asia Location within Uzbekistan Location within Bactria
- 39°53′36″N 66°55′05″E
- Type: Settlement
- Location: Uzbekistan

Koktepe or Kok Tepe is an archaeological site in Uzbekistan, located around 30 kilometers north from Samarkand, in an area located at the boundary of the steppe during ancient times. The Koktepe site yielded the remains of the tomb of a Sarmatian princess. Koktepe was probably known to ancient writers as the city of Gabae.

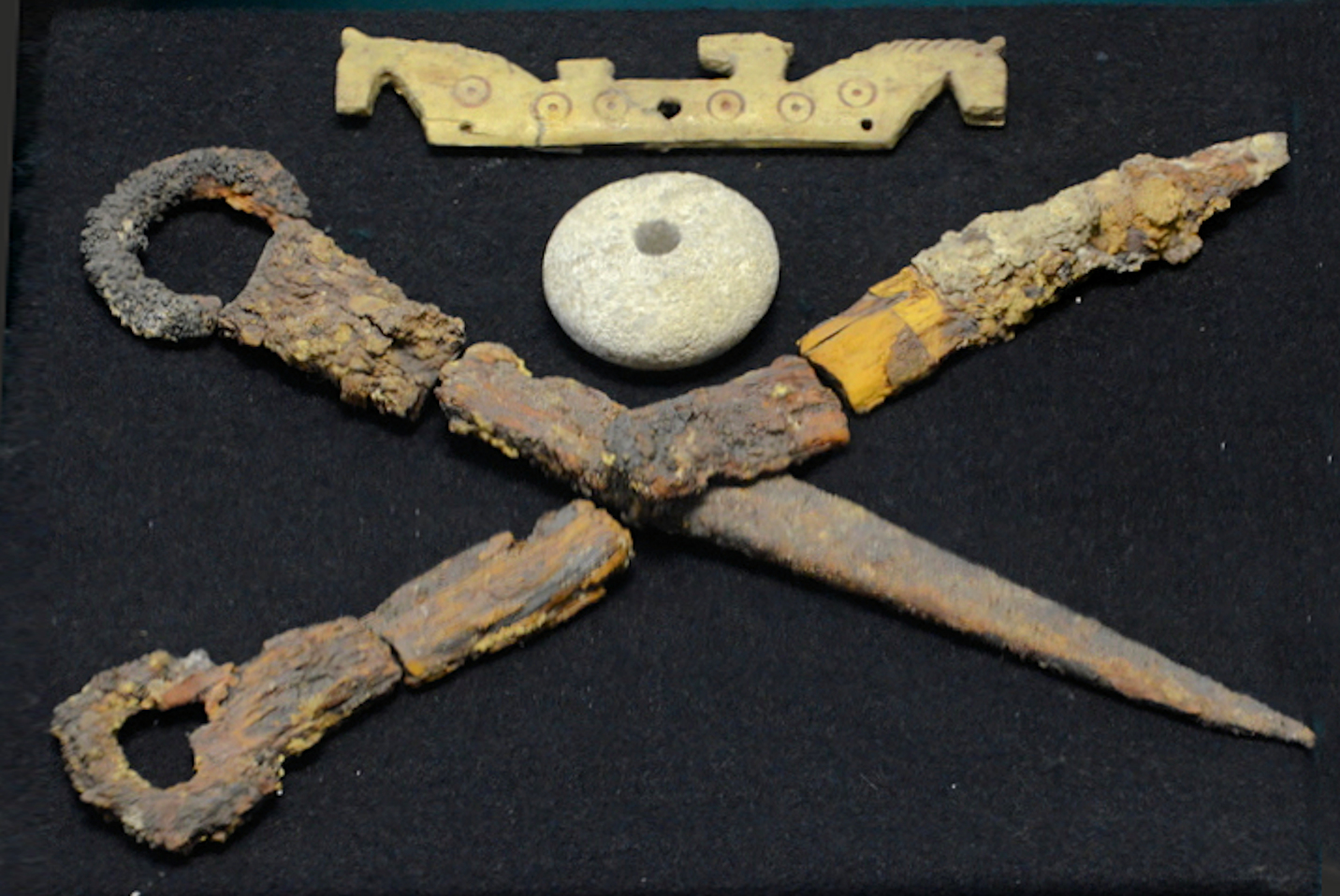
Tomb artefacts, Koktepe

== Bibliography ==
- Khasanov, Mutallib, Isamiddinov, Muxammedzon, Rapin, Claude; La tombe d'une princesse nomade à Koktepe près de Samarkand (lire en ligne)

== See also ==
- Tillia tepe
