= French Archaeological Delegation in Afghanistan =

- Délégation archéologique française en Afghanistan
- Abbreviation: DAFA
- Formation: 1922
- Founded at: France
- Type: Archaeological Delegation
- Region served: Afghanistan
- Website: dafa.fr

The French Archaeological Delegation in Afghanistan (French: La Délégation archéologique française en Afghanistan (DAFA)) was created in France in 1922 at the request of the Afghan government and King Amanullah Khan to commence archaeological studies in Afghanistan. After a break in research during the Second World War, work resumed around 1946–47, until it was closed by the pro-Soviet Afghan government on December 15, 1982. Some notable 20th century French archaeologists who were part of the delegation include Jules Barthoux, Daniel Schlumberger, and Paul Bernard.

In 2002, in agreement with the Afghan authorities, the Ministry of Foreign Affairs decided to reopen and restart the activities of DAFA in Afghanistan. DAFA's new mission is first of all to develop knowledge of Afghanistan's past, in the framework of French-Afghan archaeological operations. These operations consist of the continuation of the inventory of archaeological remains (prospecting, surveys, etc. ), as well as the conduct of archaeological excavations within the framework of well-defined scientific programs or rescue requirements, which are essentially related to the intensive looting of sites. Philippe Marquis is the current director of the delegation. The archaeological discoveries and finds have contributed to the artifacts located in the National Museum of Afghanistan. They have a base in Mazar-i-Sharif.

DAFA belongs to the network of 27 French research institutes abroad of the Ministry of Foreign Affairs.

== Archaeological works ==
- 1923–1925: Works in Bactra
- 1924: Excavations of Païtava (Begram)
- 1925: Excavations of Begram (Jules Barthoux mission)
- 1926: Survey in Bactria and first works in Hadda
- 1927–1928: Excavations of Hadda (Barthoux)
- 1929: Works in Bamyan
- 1933: Excavations of Tepe Marandjan (Kabul Province)
- 1934: Excavations of Khair Khane
- 1936: Works in Sistan
- 1936–1937: Excavations of Bagram
- 1937: Excavations of Fondukistan (Parwan Province)
- 1937: Shotarak excavations in Sistan and Balochistan Province.
- 1947: Works in Bactra (by Daniel Schlumberger)
- 1949–1951: Excavations of Lashkari Bazar (by Schlumberger)
- 1951–1959: Contribution to the excavation of the prehistoric site of Mundigak (Independent mission led by Jean-Marie Casal)
- 1952–1961: Excavations of Surkh Kotal (by Schlumberger)
- 1957: Discovery of the site of the Minaret of Jam
- 1957: Work in the Foladi Valley
- ?–1963: Excavations of Kohna Masdjid
- 1963–1965: Excavations of the monastery of Gul Dara
- 1963: Excavations of Shakh Tepe
- 1964: Surveys at Ai-Khanoum
- 1965–1978: Excavations of the site of Ai-Khanoum (by Paul Bernard)
- 1974–1976: Surveys of the plain of Ai-Khanoum
- 1976–1978; Surveys of Upper Tokharestan
- 1976–1978: Excavations of Shortughai
- 2004–2007: Excavations of Bactra (Balkh)
- 2005: Excavations of Al-Ghata
- 2005–2007: Franco-German works at Herat
- 2005–2007: Works on the mosque of Haji Piyada.
- 2010–2014: Excavations in Mes Aynak
- 2014–2017: Work in Bamyan

== Directors ==
The following list is of the directors of the French archaeological delegation.

- 1922–1945: Alfred Foucher
- 1934–1941: Joseph Hackin
- 1941–1942: Roman Girshman
- 1946–1964: Daniel Schlumberger
- 1965–1980: Paul Bernard
- 1980–1982: Jean-Claude Gardin
- 2002–2006: Roland Besenval
- 2006–2014: Philippe Marquis
- 2014–2018: Julio Bendezu-Sarmiento
- 2018–present: Philippe Marquis

== Sources and external links ==
- The opening of the DAFA in Afghanistan (1922-1982) by P. Bernard at the site of l'Académie des Inscriptions et Belles Lettres.
- The DAFA on the website of Musée Guimet (Paris, France).
- Official website of DAFA

== See also ==
- Bernard, Paul: « L'oeuvre de la DAFA en Afghanistan (1922-1982) », CRAI 2002, p. 1287-1323.
- Olivier-Utard, Françoise: Politique et archéologie : histoire de la Délégation archéologique française en Afghanistan, 1922–1982, 2e édition, préface de Jean-Claude Gardin, Paris, éd. Recherche sur les civilisations, 2003, 423 p. (1re éd., Paris, De Boccard, 1997).
- Fenet, Annick: Documents d’archéologie militante. La mission Foucher en Afghanistan (1922–1925), Paris, 2010, 695 p. (Mémoires de l’Académie des Inscriptions et Belles-Lettres 42).
- Fenet, Annick: chapter 8 « The original ‘failure’? A century of French archaeology in Afghan Bactria », in R. Mairs (éd.), The Graeco-Bactrian and Indo-Greek world, Routledge, Londres, 2020, p. 142-170.
- Fenet, Annick and Wang, Helen, ‘Archaeology in Afghanistan in the 20th Century As Reported in the French and British Press’, *Silk Roads Archaeology and Heritage* 1(1), 2023, p. 100–108. https://doi.org/10.5334/srah.11.
