= Daniel Schlumberger =

French archaeologist (1904–1972)

- Born: Daniel Théodore Schlumberger; 19 December 1904; Mülhausen, German Empire
- Died: 21 October 1972 (aged 67); Princeton, New Jersey, United States
- Occupation: Archaeologist

Daniel Théodore Schlumberger (19 December 1904 – 21 October 1972) was a French archaeologist and a professor of Near Eastern Archaeology at the University of Strasbourg and later Princeton University.

== Biography ==
After having been invited by Khan Nasher in the 1960s, Schlumberger conducted fieldwork at Ay Khanum in Afghanistan as Director of the Délégation Archéologique Française, discovering ruins and artifacts of the Hellenistic period. His written works were included posthumously in The Cambridge History of Iran (1983).

He was an older brother of Jean Schlumberger.
