= Alfred Charles Auguste Foucher =

Alfred Charles Auguste Foucher (1865–1952), was a French scholar, who argued that the Buddha image has Greek origins. He has been called the "father of Gandhara studies", and is a much-cited scholar on ancient Buddhism in northwest Indian subcontinent and the Hindu Kush region.

== Travels ==
He made his first trip to northeastern India in 1895. In 1910 he examined the Great Zimbabwe and the Khami ruins, proclaiming both were made by Phoenicians. His views on ruins in southern Africa are not considered accurate by modern scholars. In 1922 he was asked by the governments of France and Afghanistan to organize an archeological co-operative which became the French Archaeological Delegation in Afghanistan (DAFA).

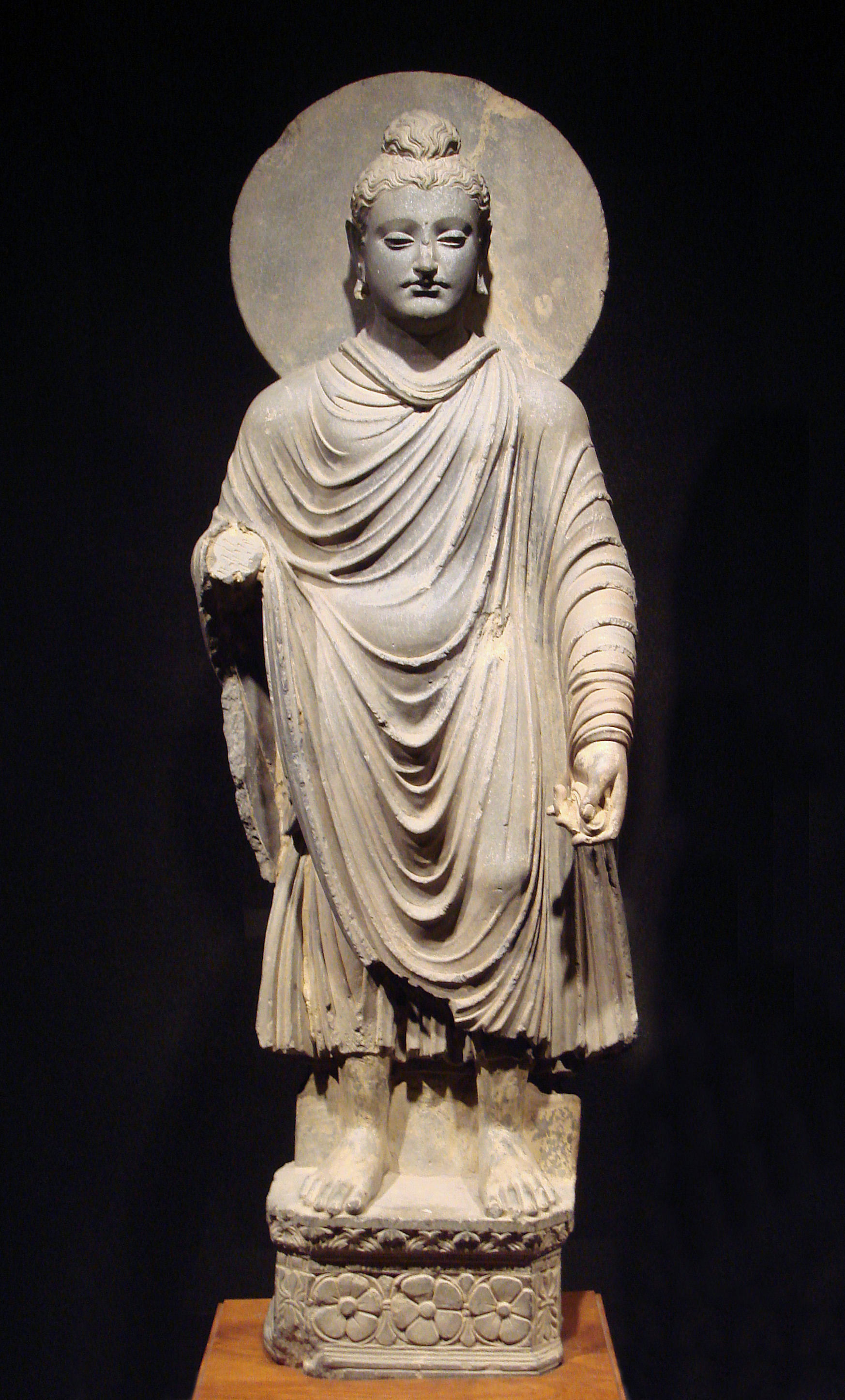
One of the first representations of the Buddha, Gandhara, in pure Hellenistic style and technique. Foucher considers such statues as Greek work of the 1st century BCE.

Foucher's most famous work was L'Art Gréco-Bouddhique du Gandhara in which he described how Buddhist art prior to Pan-Hellenism was principally aniconic, representing the Buddha by depicting elements of the Buddha's life instead of depicting the Buddha himself. Foucher argued that the first sculpted images of the Buddha were heavily influenced by Greek artists. He coined the term "Greco-Buddhist art".

Foucher especially considered Hellenistic free-standing Buddhas as "the most beautiful, and probably the most ancient of the Buddhas", assigning them to the 1st century BCE, and making them the starting point of the anthropomorphic representations of the Buddha ("The Buddhist art of Gandhara", Marshall, p101).

Following the mid-20th century discovery of Roman trading posts in Southern India, Foucher's argument was revised in favour of Roman influence, as opposed to Greek.

New archeological discoveries in Central Asia however (such as the Hellenistic city of Ai-Khanoum and the excavation of Sirkap in modern Pakistan), have been pointing to rich Greco-Bactrian and Indo-Greek civilizations in these areas, reviving the Hellenistic thesis. Nonetheless, his central thesis that the Buddha was of Classical origin has become established. For a compelling counter-argument to Foucher's essay, see Ananda K. Coomaraswamy, "The Origin of the Buddha Image".

== Works ==
- « Ksemendra. Le Buddhâvatâra », JA 20/8e série, p. 167-175; 1892
- Étude sur l'iconographie bouddhique de l'Inde d'après les documents nouveaux, Paris, 1900,
- Étude sur l'iconographie bouddhique de l'Inde d'après des textes inédits, Paris, E. Leroux, 1905.
- L'art gréco-bouddhique du Gandhâra. Étude sur les origines de l'influence classique dans l'art bouddhique de l'Inde et de l'Extrême-Orient, 2 t. [t. 1 : 1905; t. 2 en trois fasc. : 1918, 1922, 1951], Paris, Imprimerie nationale (PEFEO, 5 et 6).
- « Notes d'archéologie bouddhique : I, Le stupa de Boro-Budur; II, Les bas-reliefs de Boro-Budur; III, Iconographie bouddhique à Java », BEFEO 9, p. 1-50; 1909
- « Notes sur l'itinéraire de Hiuan-tsang en Afghanistan », dans Études asiatiques publiées à l'occasion du 25e anniversaire de l'École française d'Extrême-Orient, Paris, G. van Oest (PEFEO, 19), p. 257-284; 1926
- The monuments of Sâñchî, (avec John Marshall), 3 vol., [Delhi, Government Press]; 1939
- La vieille route de l'Inde de Bactres à Taxila, (avec E. Bazin-Foucher),2 vol., Paris, Éd. d'Art et d'Histoire; 1942–47 La Vieille Route de l'Inde de Bactres à Taxila : vol.1 La Vieille Route de l'Inde de Bactres à Taxila : vol.2
- Éléments de systématique et de logique indiennes : Le Compendium des topiques (Tarka-samgraha) d'Annam-Bhatta, Paris, Adrien-Maisonneuve; 1949
- La vie du Bouddha, d'après les textes et les monuments de l'Inde, Paris, Payot; 1949
- Les vies antérieures du Bouddha, d'après les textes et les monuments de l'Inde, Paris, PUF; 1955
