= Paul Bernard (archaeologist) =

French archaeologist (1929–2015)

- Born: June 13, 1929; Sainte-Maxime, France
- Died: December 1, 2015 (aged 86); Meulan-en-Yvelines
- Known for: Director of excavations at Ai-Khanoum
- Scientific career
- Fields: Classical archaeology
- Institutions: DAFA, EPHE

Paul Bernard (13 June 1929 – 1 December 2015) was a French archaeologist, best known for excavating the Hellenistic site of Ai-Khanoum in present-day Afghanistan between 1964 and 1978. In his role as director of excavations, Bernard wrote several treatises on the excavations on the site. He also produced the accounts of Ai-Khanoum that had the most influence on the scholarship on the city: foremost among these was a 1982 article in Scientific American titled 'An Ancient Greek City in Central Asia', which presented the city as a Hellenistic colony in Central Asia. His emphasis on the Greek traditions of Ai-Khanoum have influenced all subsequent accounts of the Hellenistic Far East.
