= Butkara Stupa =

Buddhist structure in Khyber Pakhtunkhwa, Pakistan

- بت کړہ سټوپا (Pashto)
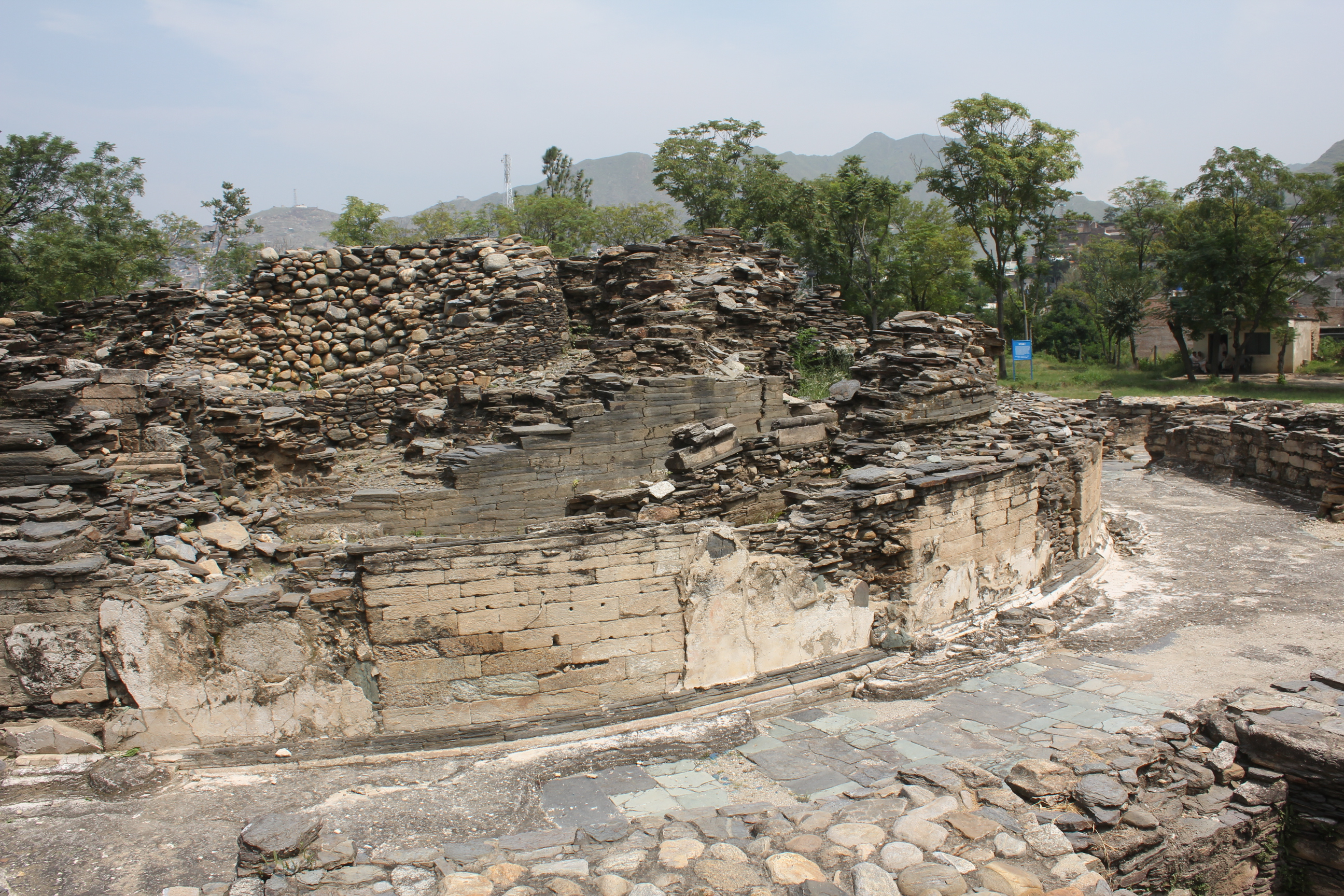
- Remains of the Butkara Stupa

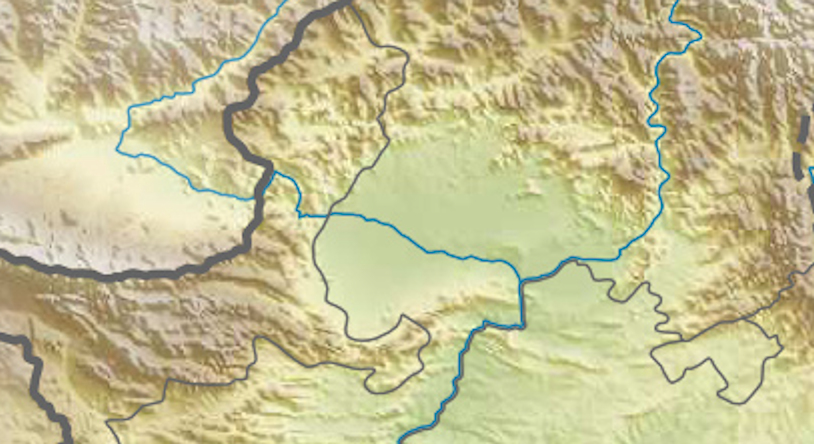
- Location within Pakistan Location within Gandhara
- 34.7571°N 72.3622°E
- Type: Buddhist stupa
- Periods: Gandhara
- Location: Swat; Khyber Pakhtunkhwa; Pakistan

History
- Built: 2nd century BCE

The Butkara Stupa (Pashto: بت کړه سټوپا) is an important Buddhist stupa near Mingora, in the area of Swat, Pakistan. It may have been built by the Mauryan emperor Ashoka, but it is generally dated slightly later to the 2nd century BCE.

The stupa was enlarged on five occasions during the following centuries, every time by building over, and encapsulating, the previous structure.

== Excavation ==
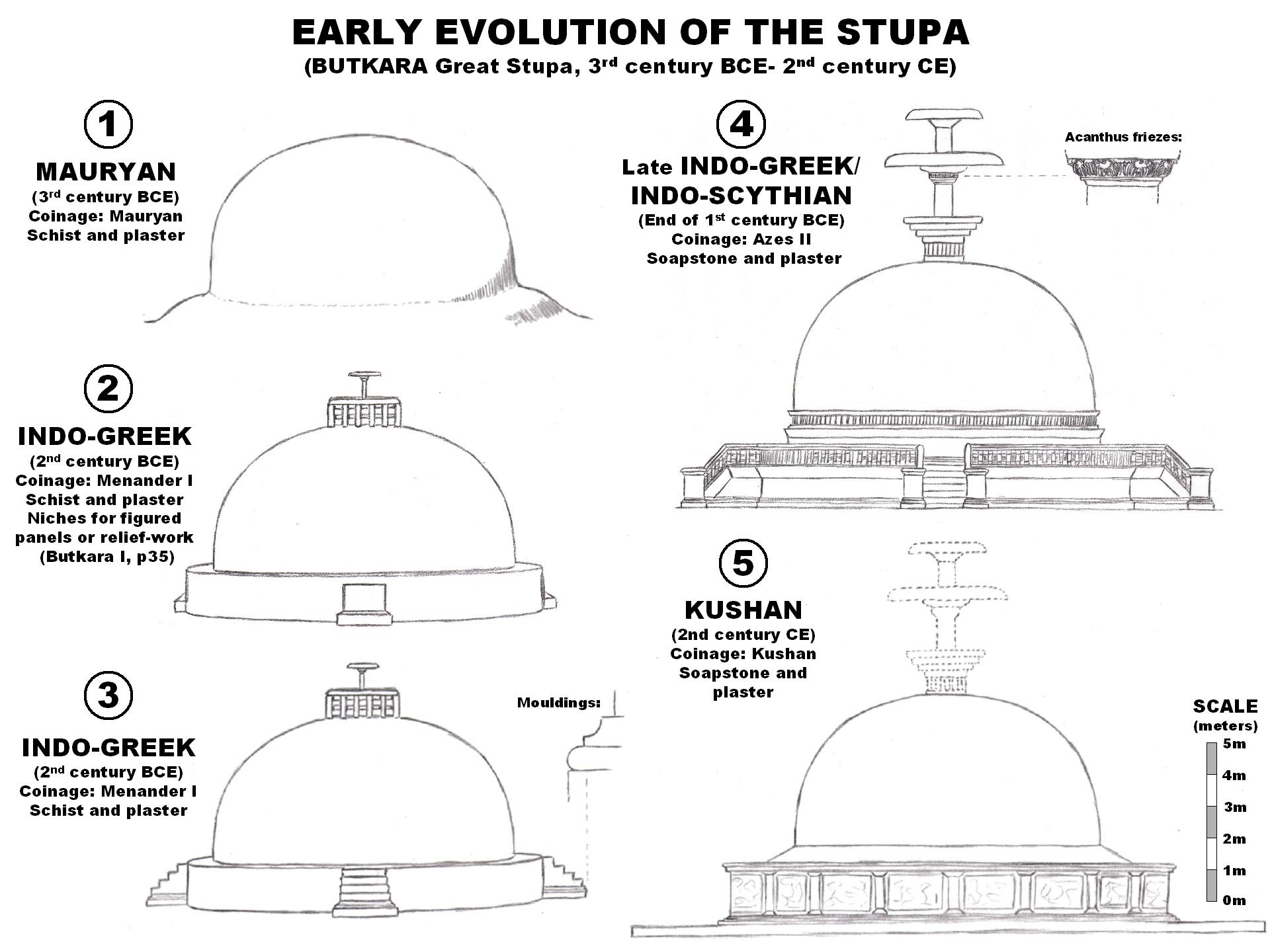
Evolution of the Butkara stupa

The stupa was excavated by an Italian mission (IsIOAO: Istituto Italiano per l'Africa e l'Oriente), led by archaeologist Domenico Faccenna from 1956, to clarify the various steps of the construction and enlargements. The mission established that the stupa was "monumentalized" by the addition of Hellenistic architectural decorations during the 2nd century BCE, suggesting a direct involvement of the Indo-Greeks, rulers of Indus (modern-day Pakistan) during that period, in the development of Greco-Buddhist architecture.

An Indo-Corinthian capital representing a Buddhist devotee within foliage has been found which had a reliquary and a coin of Azes II buried at its base, securely dating the sculpture to earlier than 20 BCE.

The nearby Hellenistic fortifications of Barikot are also thought to be contemporary.

A large quantity of the artifacts are preserved in the National Museum of Oriental Art and the City Museum of Ancient Oriental Art in Turin (M.A.O.).

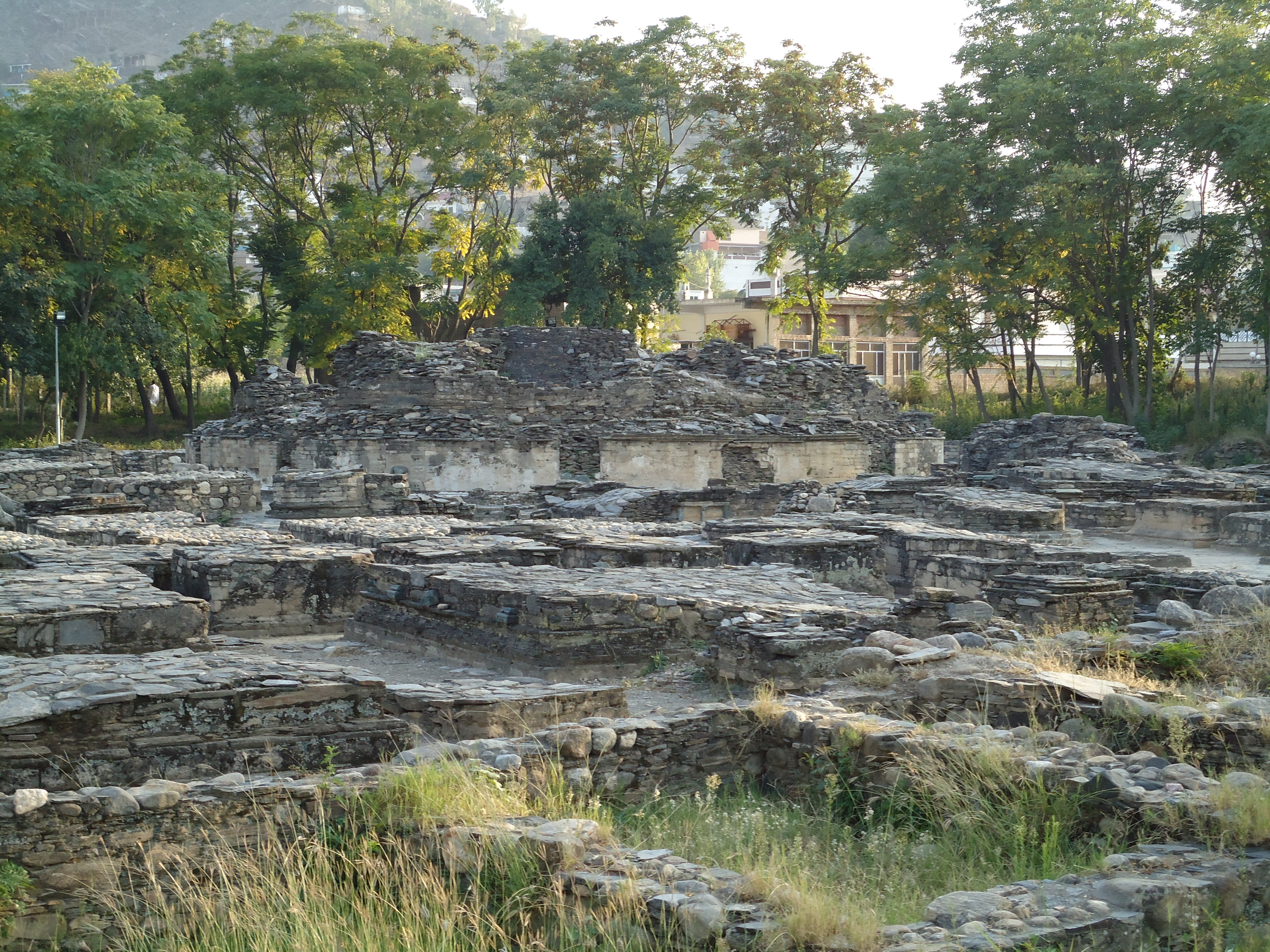
Ruins of Butkara I.

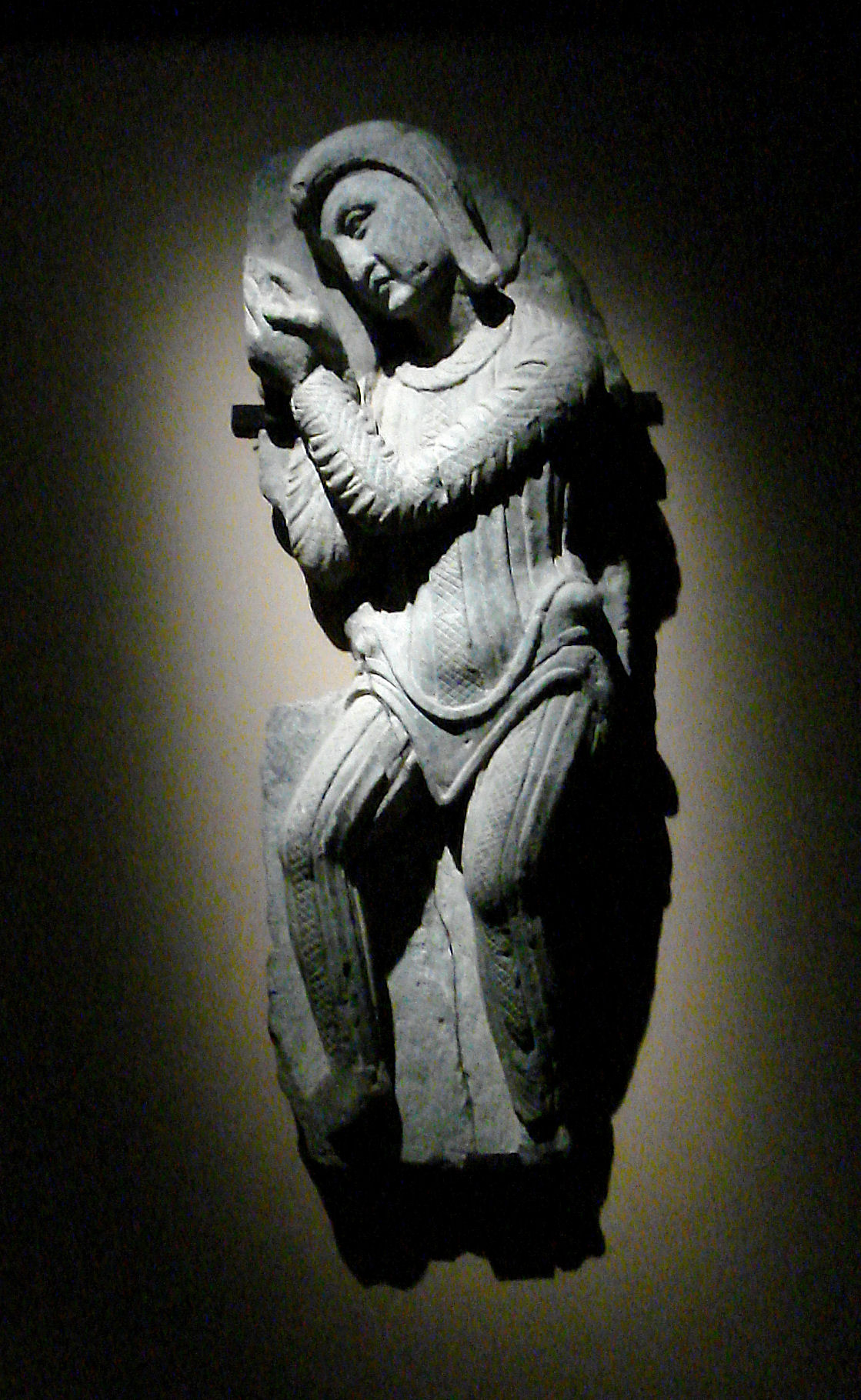
Indo-Scythian devotee, Butkara I.

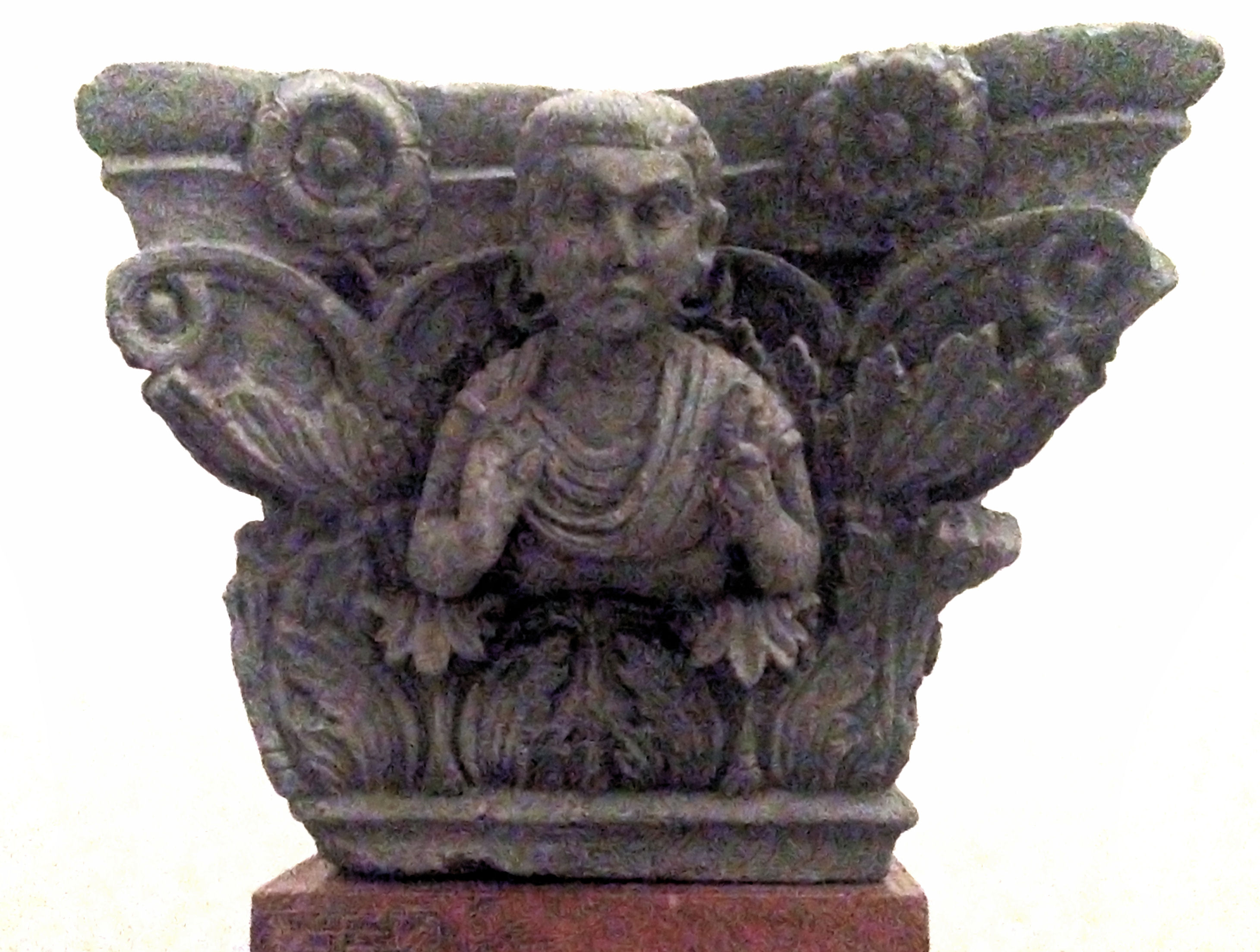
Indo-Corinthian capital representing a Buddhist devotee wearing a Greek cloak (chlamys) with fibula. Butkara Stupa, National Museum of Oriental Art, Rome.

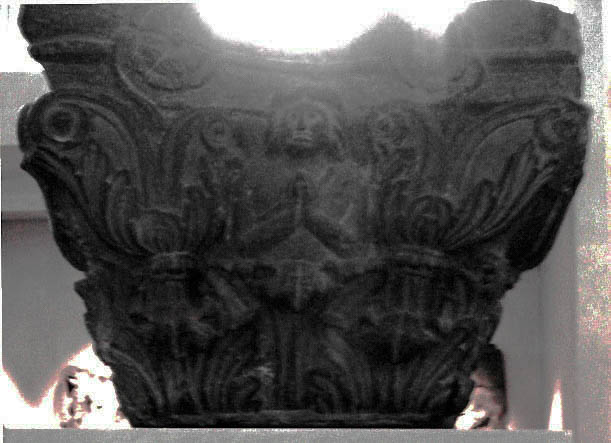
The Indo-Corinthian capital from Butkara Stupa under which a coin of Azes II was found. Dated to 20 BCE or earlier (Turin City Museum of Ancient Art).

== Coinage and datation ==
The oldest core strata (GSt 1) revealed a coin of Chandragupta Maurya and is therefore dated to the Ashokan period. A coin of Menander I was found in the second oldest stratum (GSt 2). A coin of Azes II was found under a plinth of the third stratum (GSt 3), which is therefore dated to the end of the 1st century BCE or the beginning of the 1st century CE. The 4th stratum (GSt 4) contained late coins of Azes II and coins of the Kushan Kujula Kadphises.

== Seated Buddha statue ==
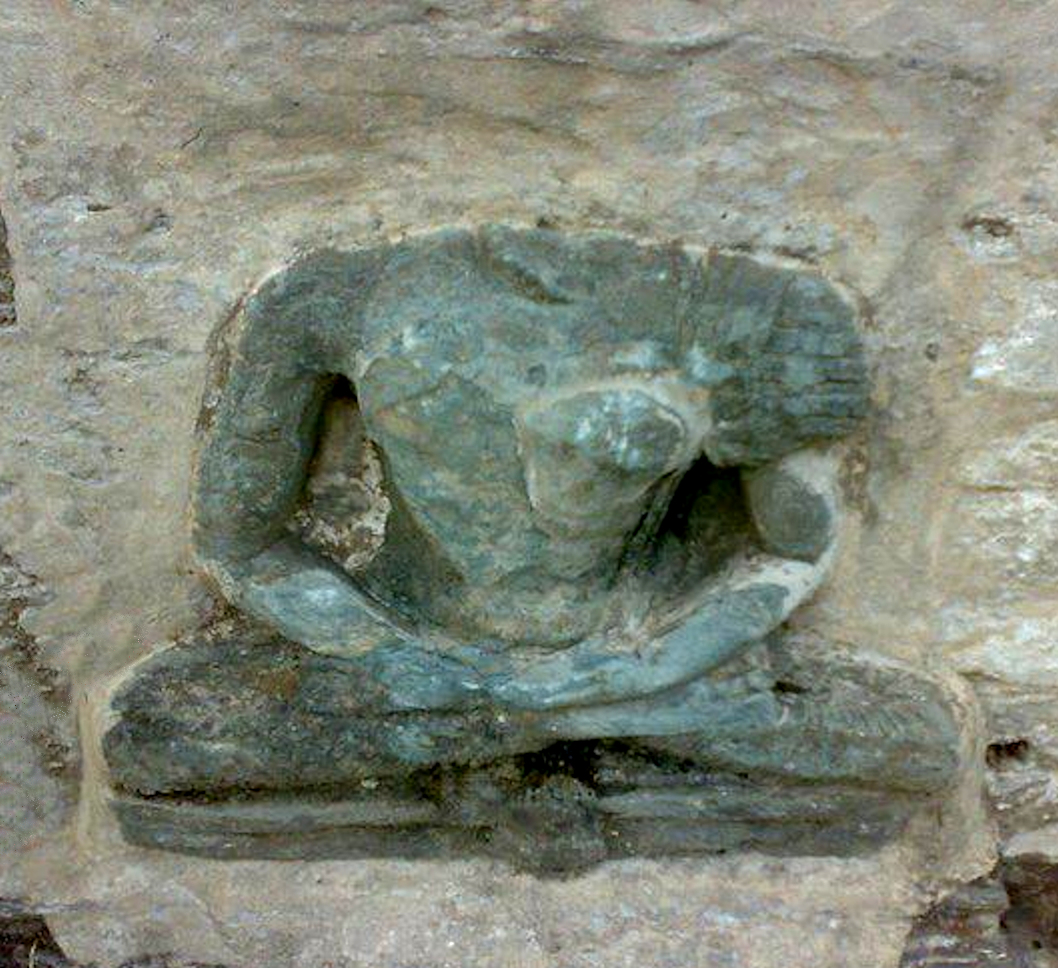
Butkara I stupa, in-situ seated Buddha, 1st-2nd century CE.

The in-situ seated Buddha (or Bodhisattva) statue at Butkara is considered one of the earliest, if not the earliest, known iconographical statues of the Buddha in northwestern India. Van Lohuizen-de Leeuw considers that the statue dates to the late 1st century BCE to the early 1st century, as it was discovered in the GSt 3 stratum that contained a coins of Azes II. More conservative estimates date it to the 1st-2nd century CE, roughly at the same time the first known statues of the Buddha were made in the art of Mathura. Probably the earliest known statue of the Buddha in the art of Mathura is the "Isapur Buddha", dated to circa 15 CE. This would make the creation of the Buddha image an approximately simultaneous phenomenon between the two geographical areas.

== Gallery ==
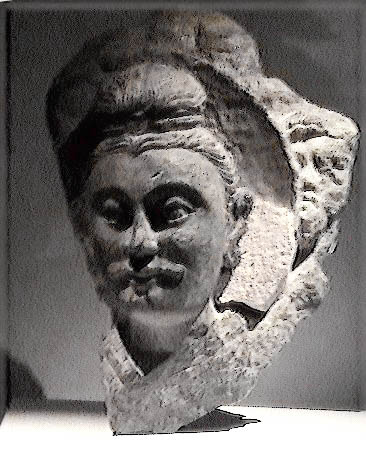
Head of the Buddha. Butkara I, 2nd century CE

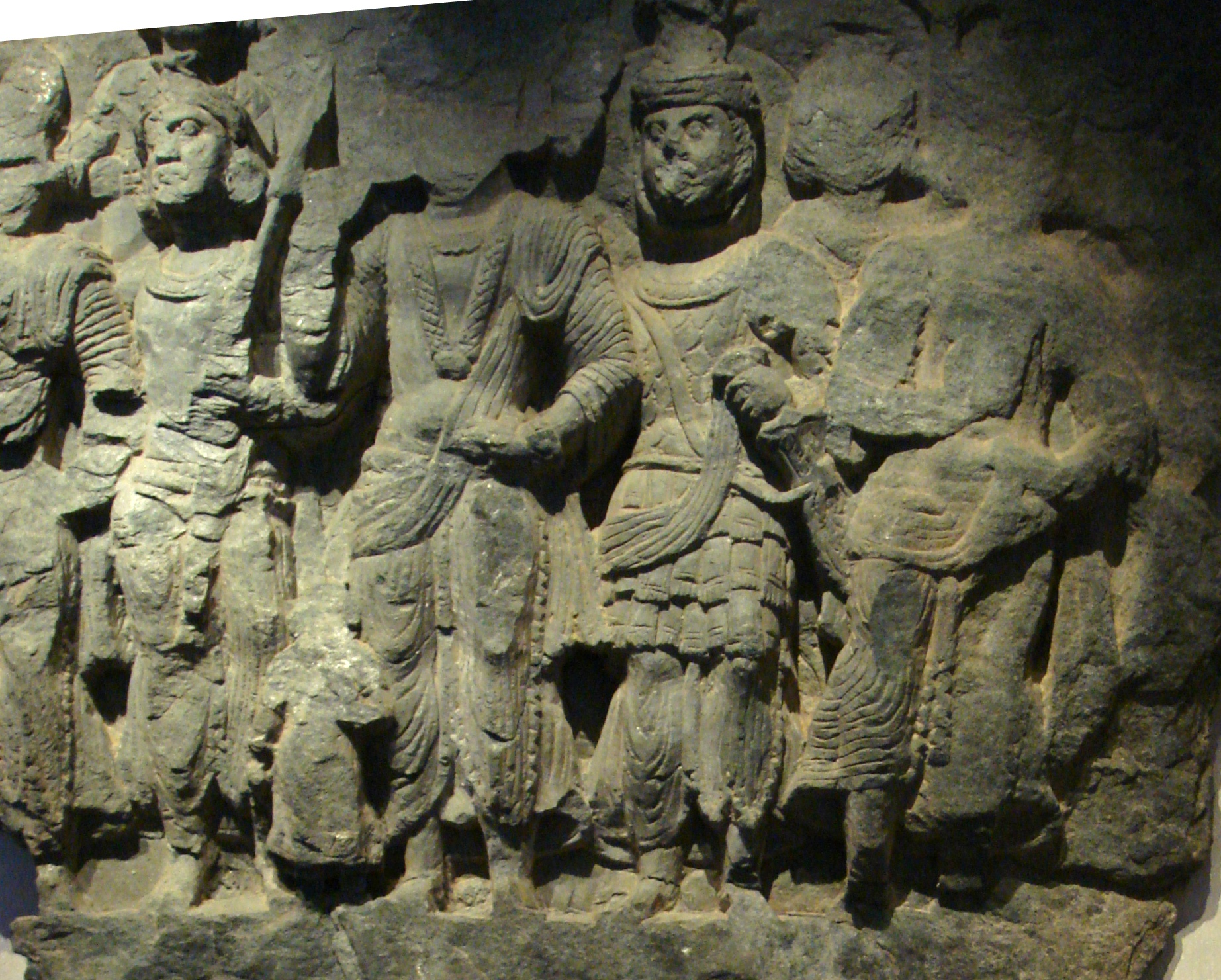
Buddhist relief with warrior. Butkara I, 1st century CE.

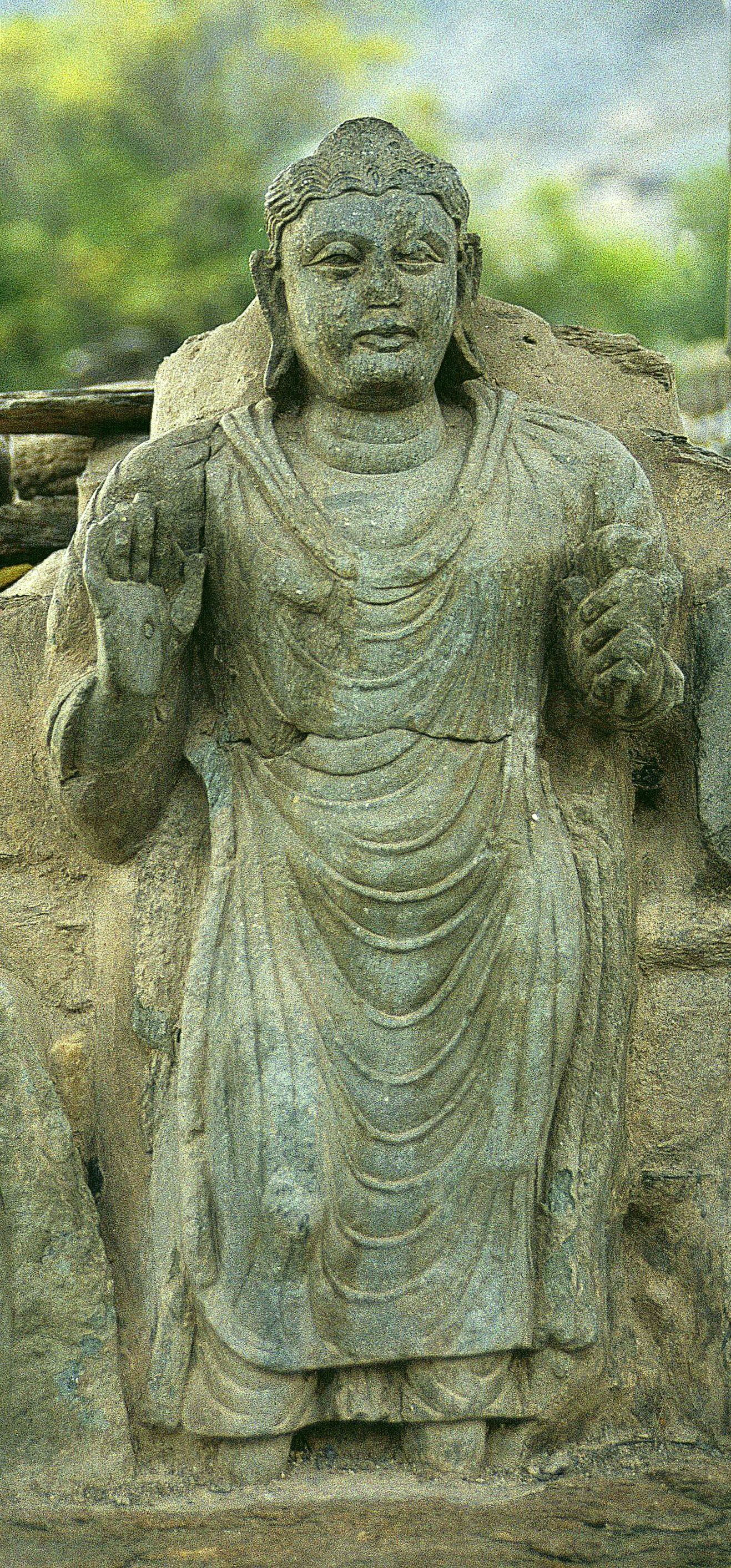
Statue at the site

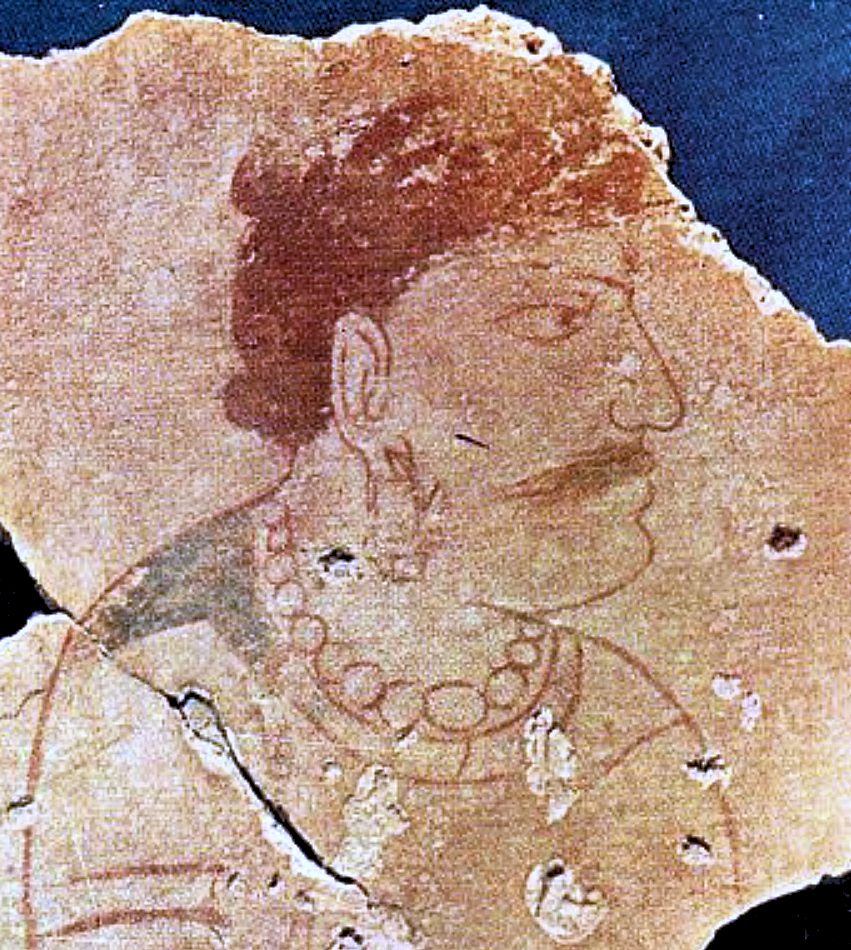
Alchon Hun devotee, Butkara I (construction phase 4), 5th century CE.

== See also ==
- Chakhil-i-Ghoundi stupa
