= Chakhil-i-Ghoundi Stupa =

Ancient stupa

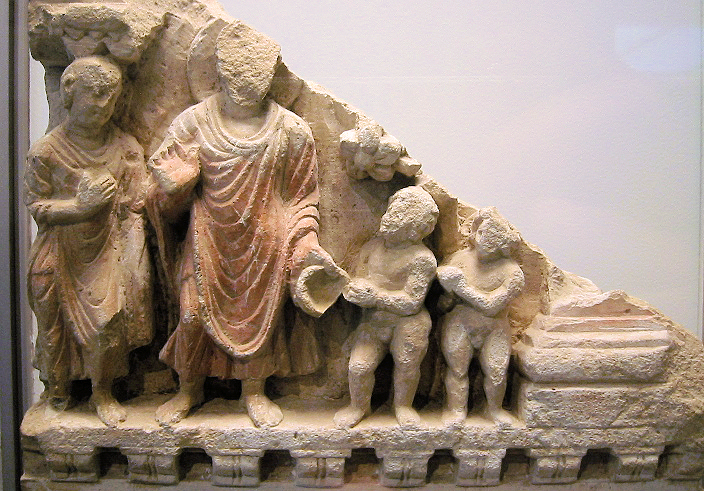
- Chakhil-i-Ghoundi Stupa
- Material: Limestone
- Created: 2nd-3rd century CE
- Discovered: 1928
- Present location: Musée Guimet, Paris
- Culture: Gandhara

The Chakhil-i-Ghoundi Stupa, also code-named "Stupa C1", is a small limestone stupa from the Chakhil-i-Ghoundi monastery, at the archeological site of Hadda in eastern Afghanistan. Most of the remains of the stupa were gathered in 1928, by the archeological mission of Frenchman Jules Barthoux of the French Archaeological Delegation in Afghanistan, and have been preserved and reconstituted through a collaboration with the Tokyo National Museum. They are today on display at the Musée Guimet in Paris. It is usually dated to the 2nd–3rd century CE.

The decoration of the stupa provides an interesting case of Greco-Buddhist art, combining Hellenistic and Indian artistic elements. The reconstitution consists of several parts, the decorated stupa base, the canopy, and various decorative elements.

== Stupa canopy ==
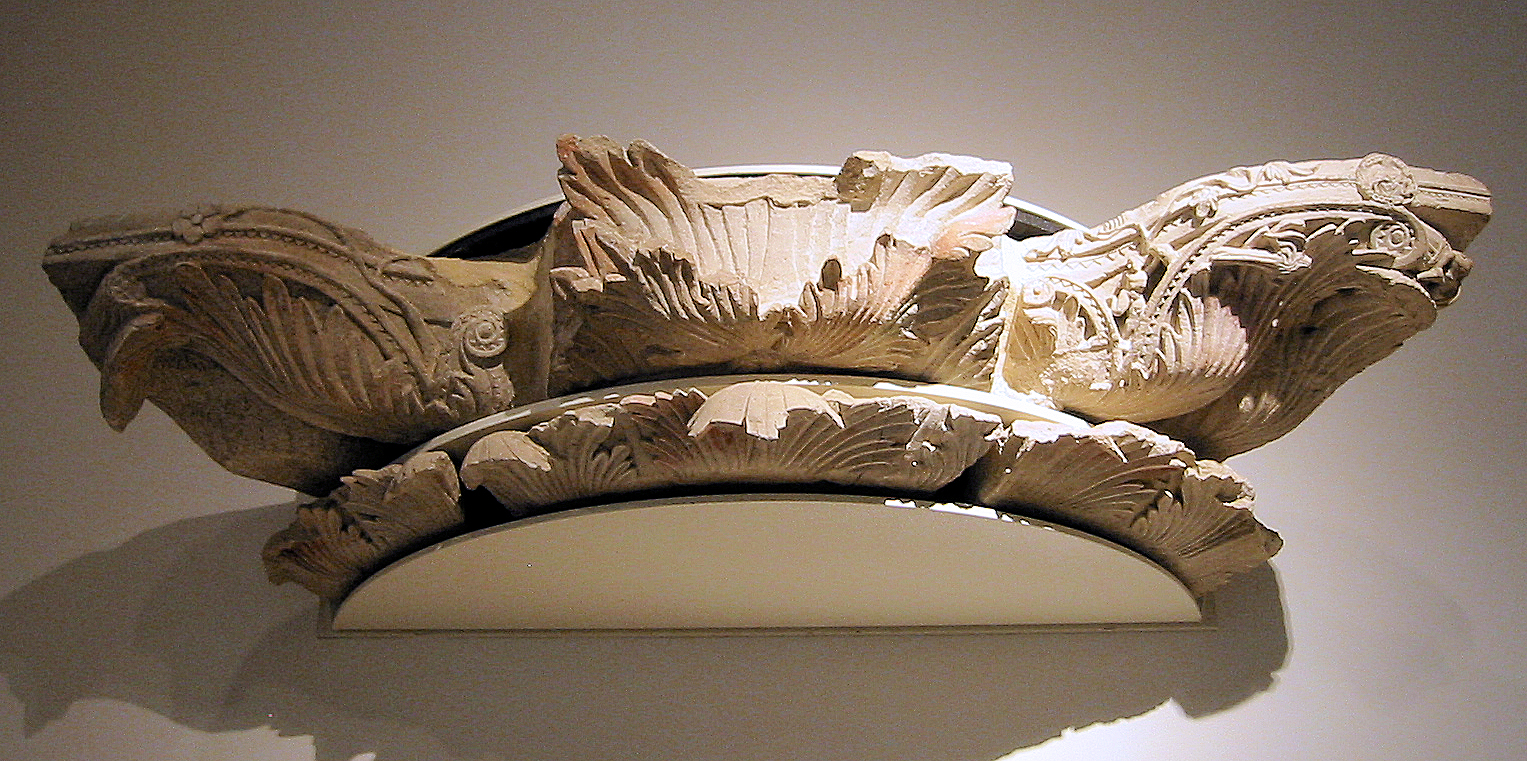
Canopy of stupa C1.

The stupa was surmounted by an elaborate canopy, a beautiful example of Indo-Corinthian capital, although typically expanded longitudinally compared to their Western counterparts.

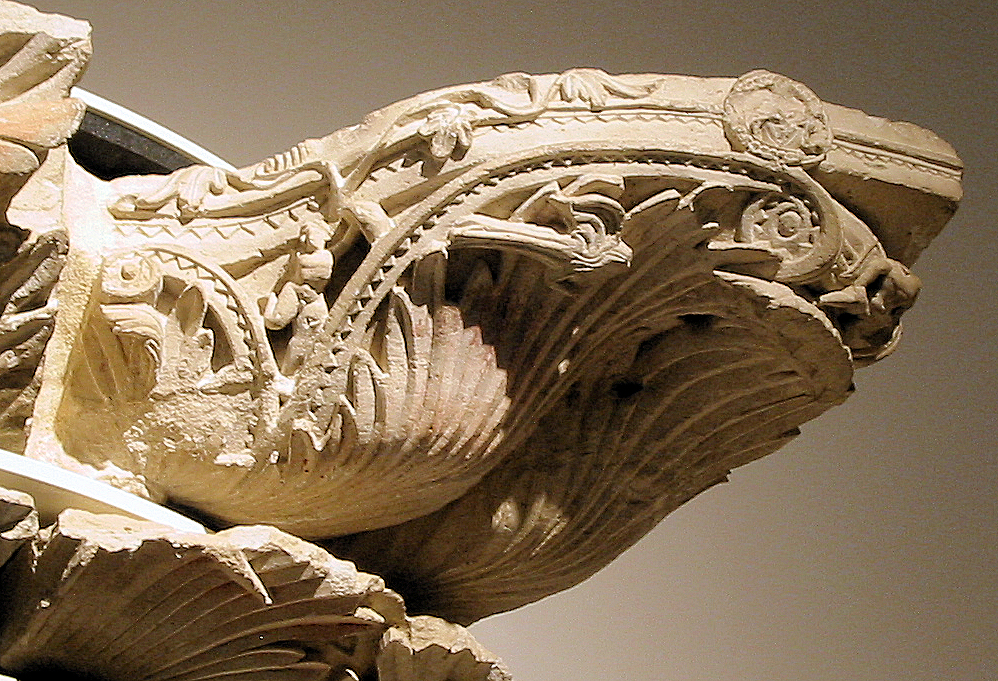
Right detail.

The central space of the capital must have accommodated a small statuette of a seated Buddha, as usually for these architectural elements in northwestern India.

Details reveal elaborate carving, and the presence of naked amorini and vines in the acanthus foliage.

== Stupa base ==
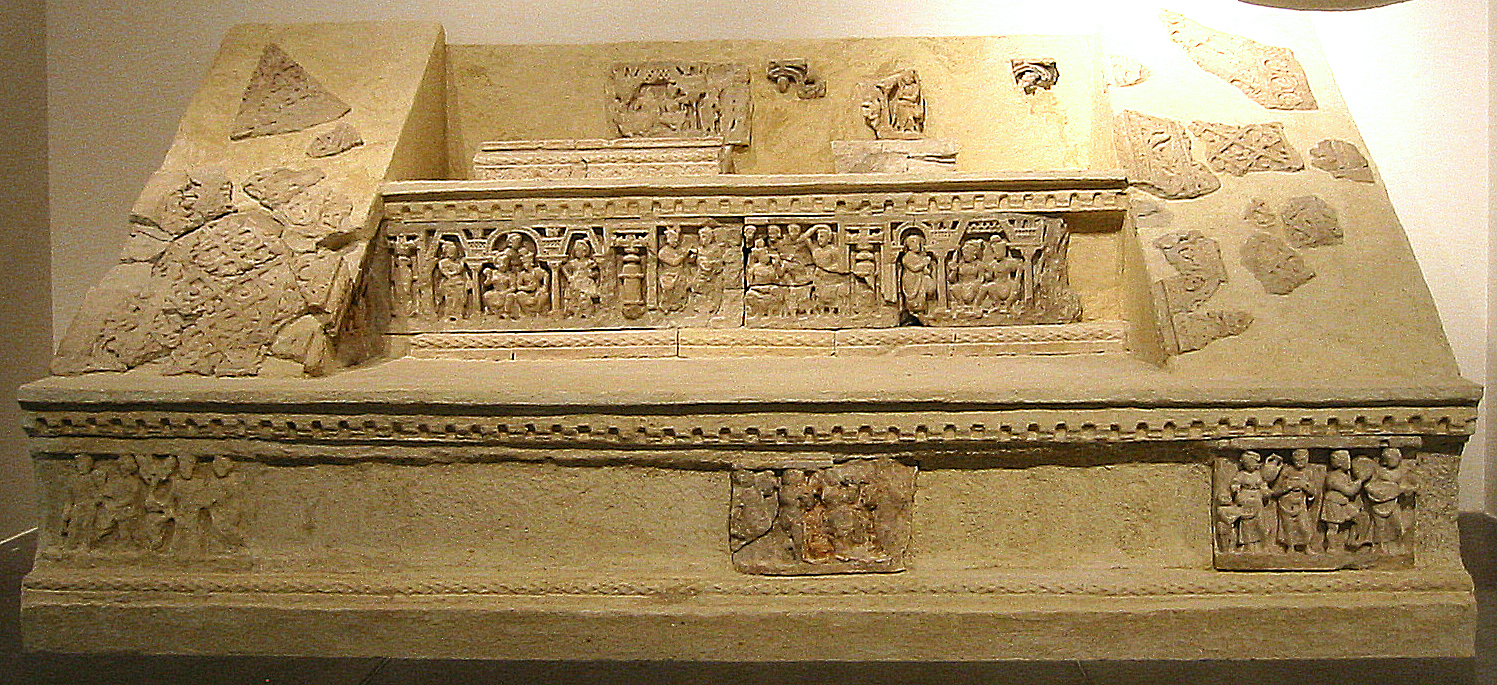
The reconstituted base of Stupa C1.

The stupa base is an elaborate construction, consisting of three tiers organised in a stair, and two sides. It has a breath of roughly 3 meters, for a height of about 1 meter. The base combines very contrasted scenes and sculptural motifs: Hellenistic scenes at the bottom tier, and Indian Buddhist scenes at the top two tiers.

=== First tier: Hellenistic revelling ===
The first tier displays several purely Hellenistic scenes, of which the one on the far right is by far the best preserved.

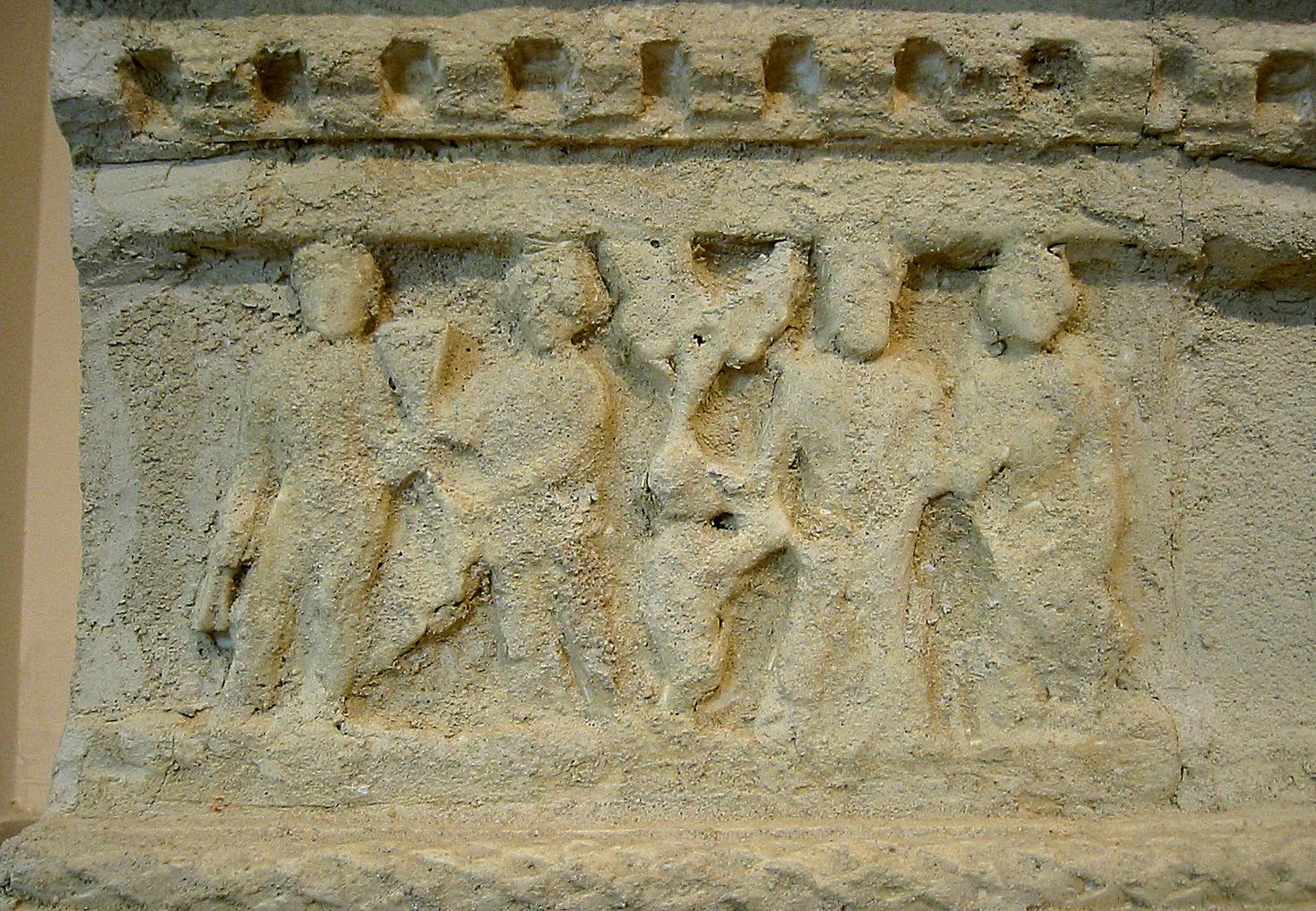
Life scene.

The left scene is a well-known Hellenistic scene often found in Gandhara. On the left is represented a young couple, the woman holding a drinking cup in the right hand, and with her left hand opening the man's chlamys (a Greek cloak) to show his naked body. On the right is an elderly couple in Greek dress, the man bearded, with a small child clinging to the man. It is thought that this scene may symbolize the cycle of life, from childhood, to adulthood and maturity.

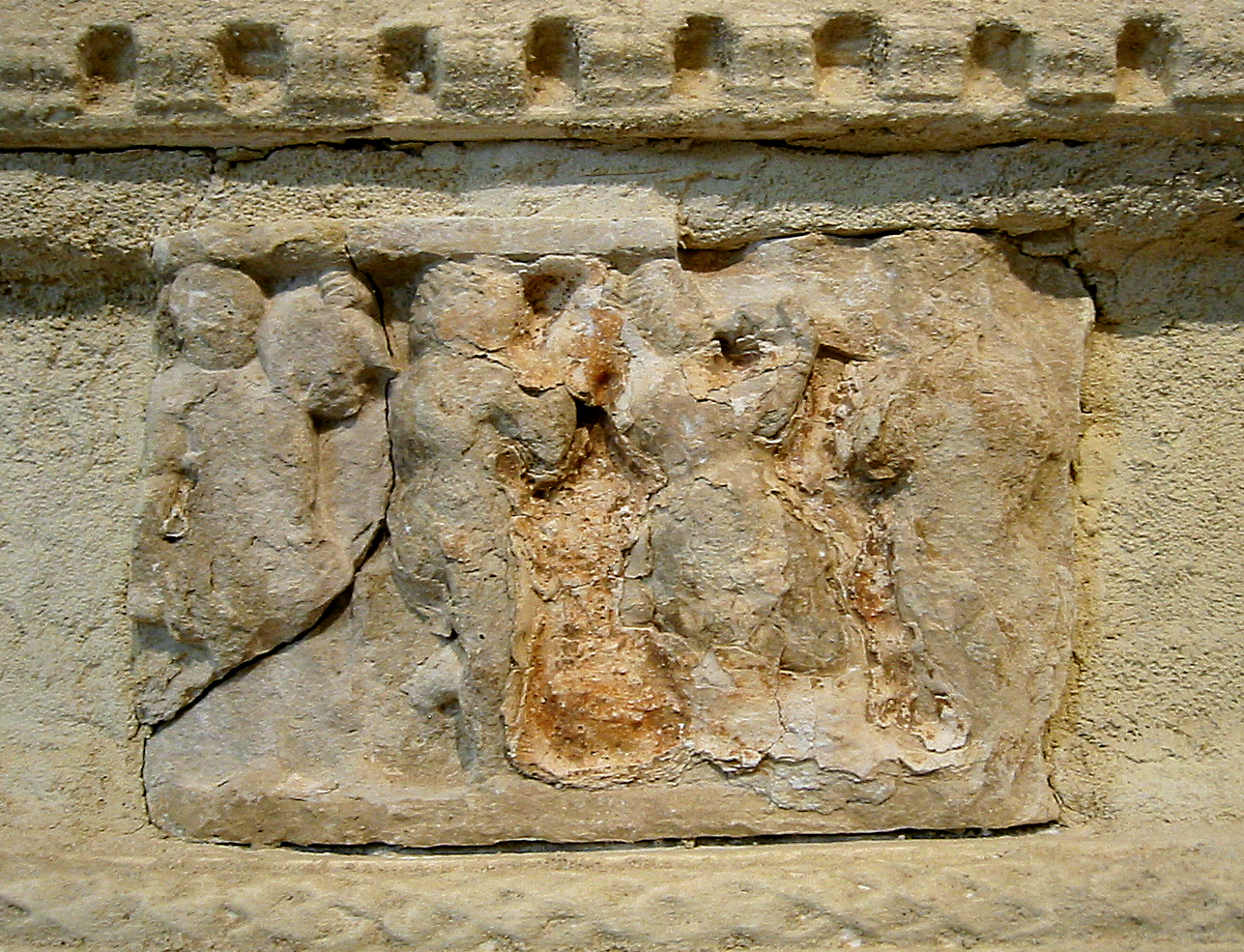
Bacchanalian scene.

The middle scene is less clear, but represents a naked man, possibly an amorini dancing with a woman in Greek dress. On the left is another amorini holding a large wine flask. A man on the right is holding something to his mouth, probably a flute to which the couple is dancing. The scene is seemingly Bacchanalian.

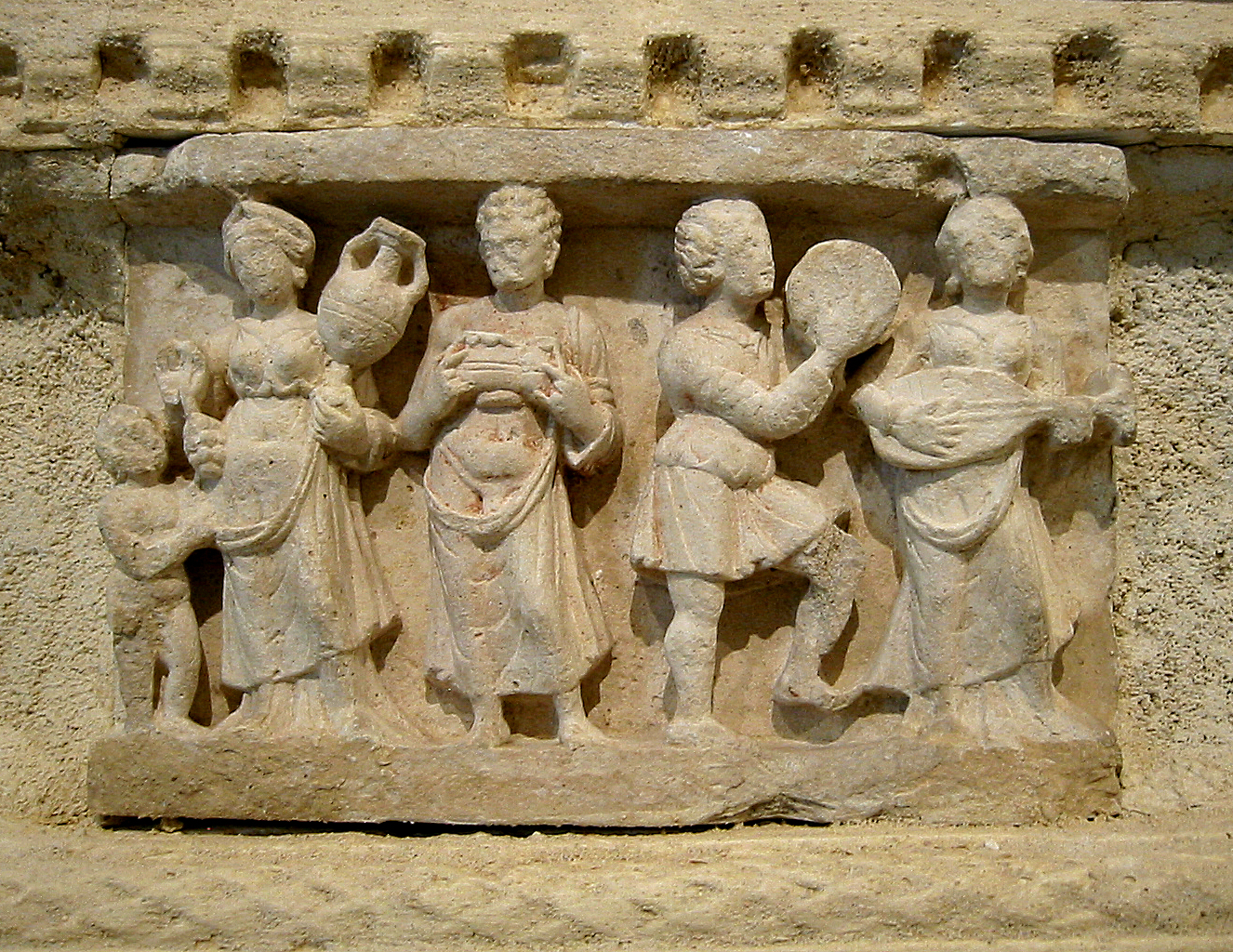
Wine and dance scene.

The scene on the right is by far the clearest. It precisely shows: a woman in Greek dress, holding an amphora and giving a grape to a small child, a man in himation holding a kantaros drinking vessel, a young man in chiton playing a hand drum, and a woman in Greek dress playing a two-stringed lute-family instrument.

=== Second tier: Indian palatial scene ===
The second tier of the stupa base displays a Buddhist Indian scene. Depending on interpretations, it seems to show a princely couple whose son is convinced to shave his head and become a Buddhist monk. In the last scene on the right, he is seen in Buddhist garb, bidding farewell to his parents.

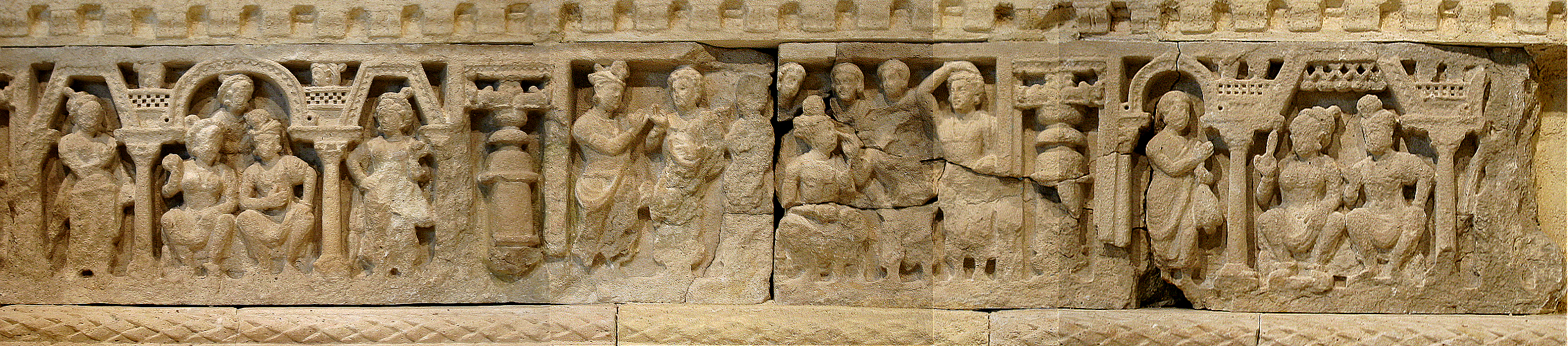
Buddhist Indian scene of the second tier.

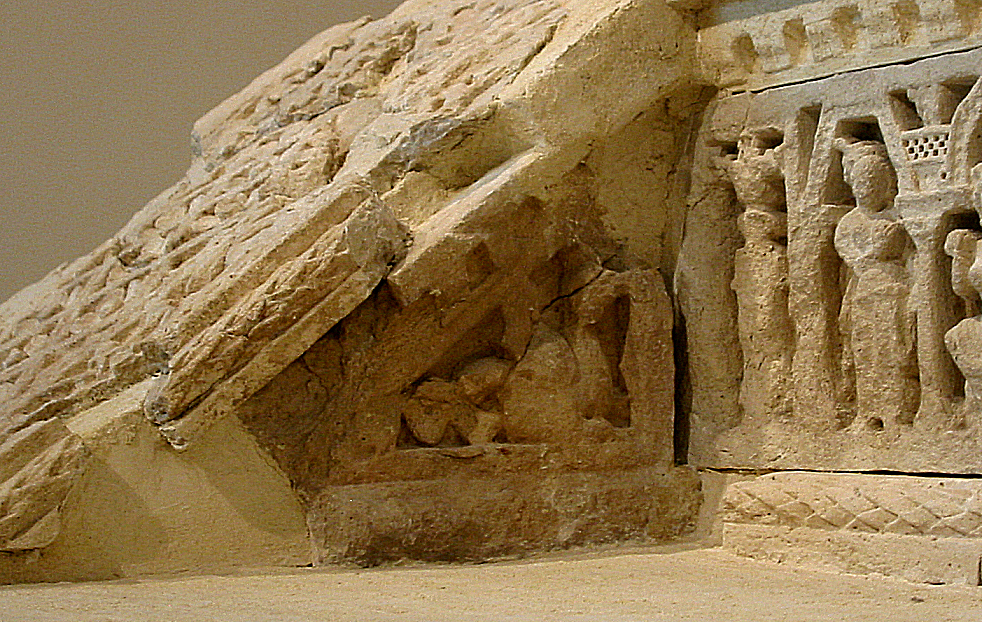
The triangular stair riser, depicting a Ketos sea monster.

Stylistically, it is most interesting that these Indian scenes were realized by the same artist, or at least the same atelier and at the same time as the Hellenistic ones. Indeed it had been suggested previously (Marshall) that the Hellenistic scene belonged to a previous period, before the emergence of Gandharan Buddhist scenes.

The second tier is sided by triangular stair risers, which depict a Hellenistic winged Ketos sea monster, a motif often seen with such a function in Greco-Buddhist art. It is thought that the Ketos symbolizes the transition to the other world after death. Some of the Buner reliefs are much better preserved and give a better picture of the original Ketos design.

=== Third tier ===
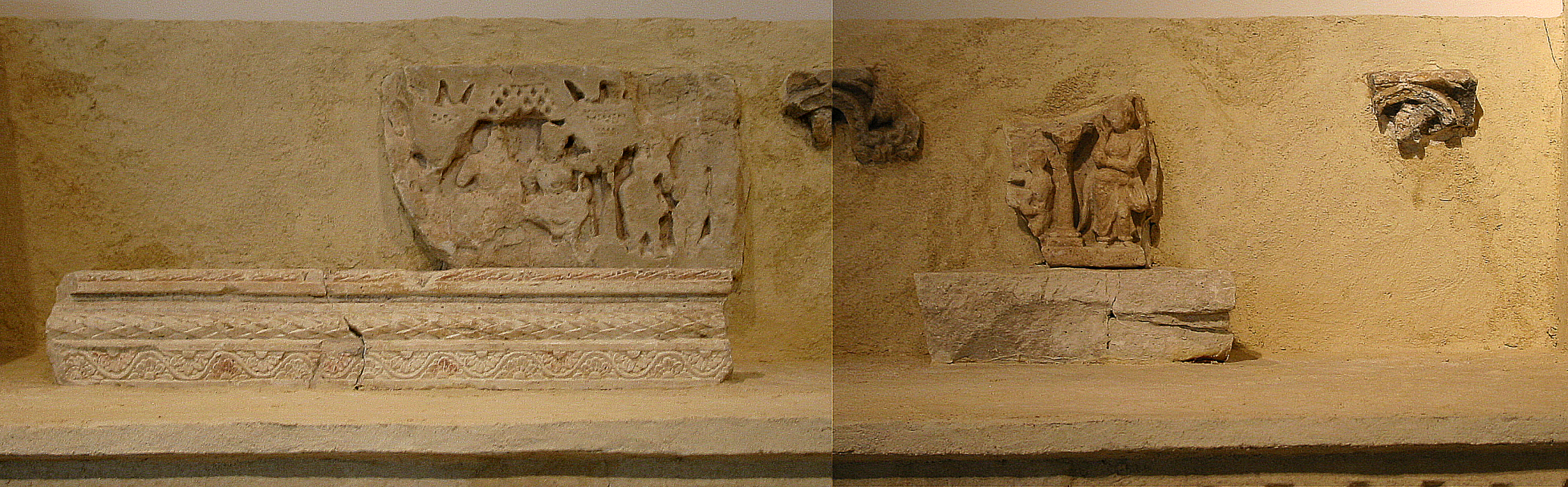
Fragments of the third tier.

Only fragments of the third tier remain, but they also depict Indian palatial scene similar to those of the second tier. A beautiful decorative garland with flowers in included at the bottom of these scenes.

== Other decorative elements ==
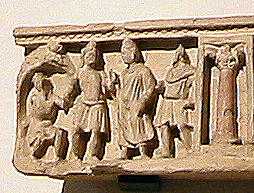
Narrative frieze (visit to the Brahman.

Various decorative elements have also been found in relation with the stupa. In particular, a Hellenistic cupids and garland design, a representation of the Buddha and Maitreya within decorated arches, a Buddhist narrative frieze, and a head of Garuda.

The left part of the narrative frieze represents the Buddha in a conventional scene (the visit to the Brahman).

At the time of the manufacture of the stupa, groups of Greek populations from the earlier Indo-Greek kingdom probably still remained, and were even organized under a king (Strato II) in the Punjab region, which would account for the rich Hellenistic influence in the stupa and the representations of people in Greek dress and attitudes on the lower friezes.

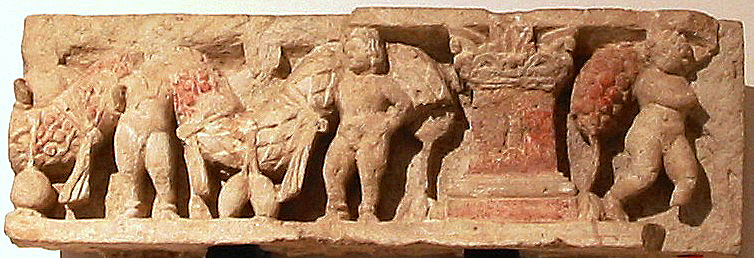
Cupids and garlands.

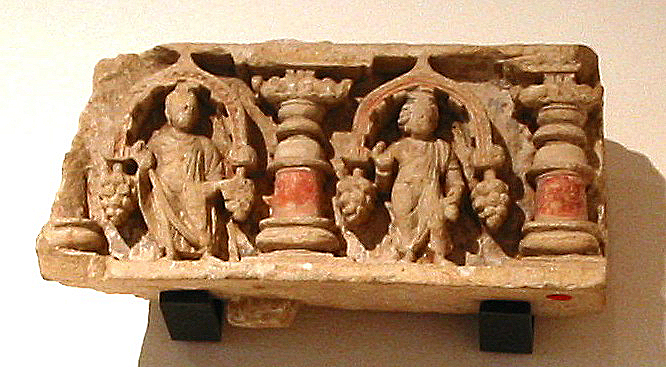
The Buddha and Maitreya.

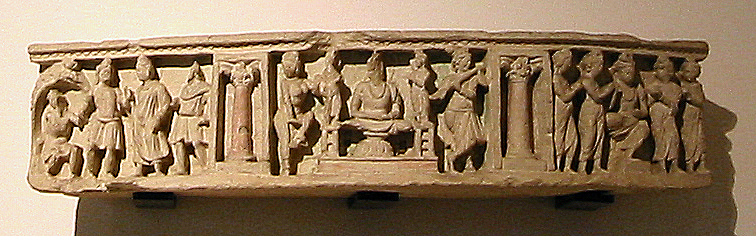
Narrative frieze.

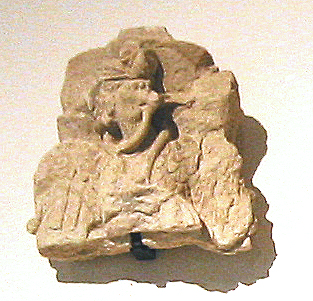
Garuda.

== See also ==
- Butkara Stupa
