= Indo-Corinthian capital =

Indo-Corinthian capitals

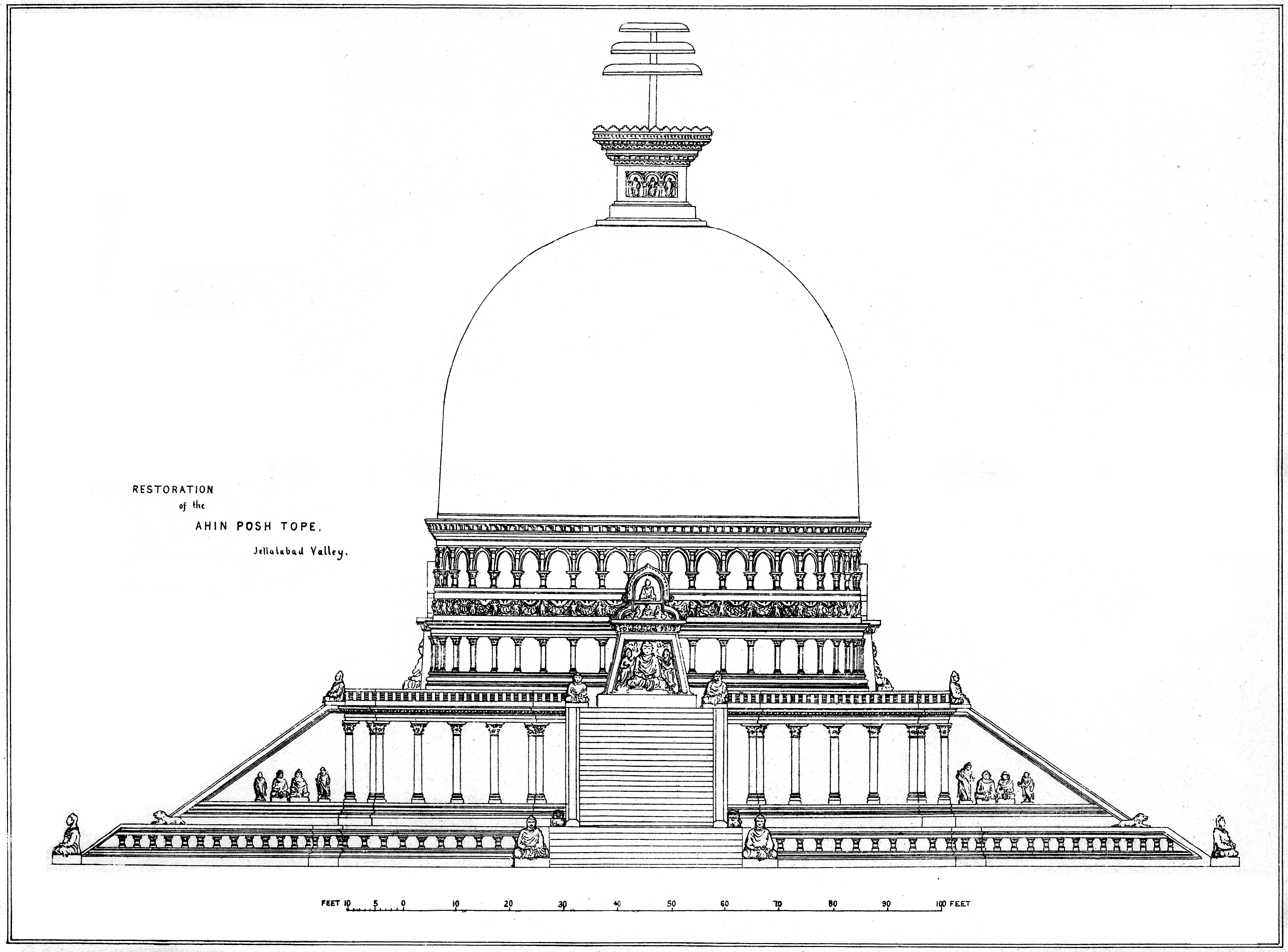
The Ahin Posh stupa was decorated with Indo-Corinthian capitals. 2nd century CE.

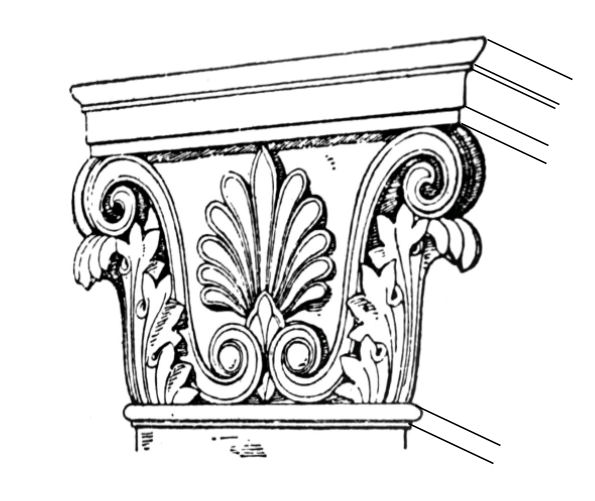
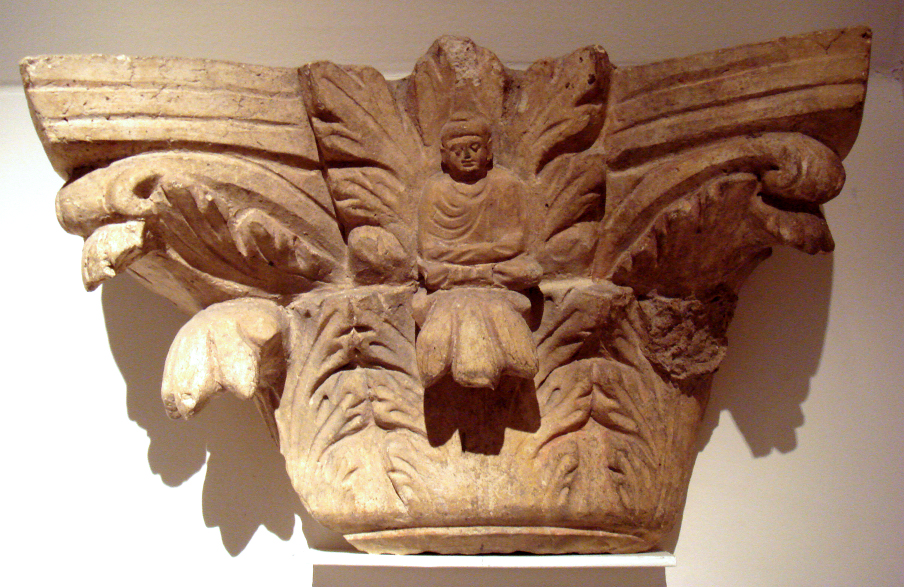
Left image: Classical Greek Corinthian anta capital.
Right image: An Indo-Corinthian capital with a palmette and the Buddha at its centre, 3-4th century, Gandhara.

Indo-Corinthian capitals are capitals crowning columns or pilasters, which can be found in the northwestern Indian subcontinent, and usually combine Hellenistic and Indian elements. These capitals are typically dated to the first centuries of the Common Era, and constitute an important aspect of Greco-Buddhist art.

== Corinthian design ==
Indo-Corinthian capitals display a design and foliage structure which is derived from the academic Corinthian capital developed in Greece. Its importation to India followed the road of Hellenistic expansion in the East in the centuries after the conquests of Alexander the Great. In particular the Greco-Bactrian kingdom, centered on Bactria (today's northern Afghanistan), upheld the type at the doorstep of India, in such places as Ai-Khanoum until the end of the 2nd century BCE. In India, the design was often adapted, usually taking a more elongated form and sometimes being combined with scrolls, generally within the context of Buddhist stupas and temples.

== Figurines ==
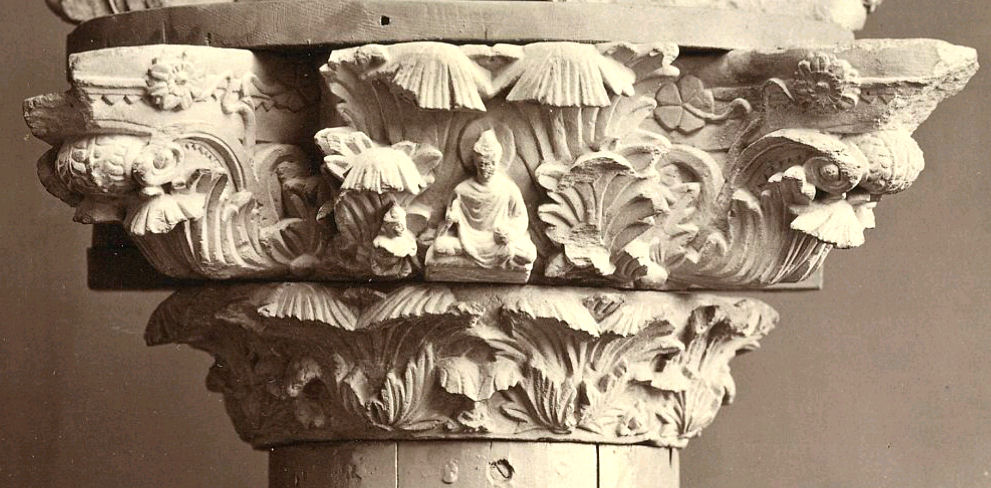
Figure of the Buddha, within a Corinthian capital, Gandhara, Jamal Garhi.

Indo-Corinthian capitals also incorporated figures of the Buddha or Bodhisattvas, usually as central figures surrounded by, and often under the shade of, the luxurious foliage of Corinthian designs. This practice was not limited to India, and also found favor in various areas of Central Asia. The depiction of figurines within the foliage of Corinthian capitals is not in itself an eastern development. In the ancient Greek world in the Mediterranean, figurines were often represented this way:

Figural additions are very common in the classical world, and from an early period, usually take the form of heads or busts, but the Gandhara treatment is original in that the acanthus leaves form a canopy over it.

== Combinations with Buddhist architecture ==
Indo-Corinthian capitals were also used in combination with architectural elements, such as Buddhist stupas. One of the best example was excavated and reconstituted at Sirkap.

Perhaps the most notable divergence from the western concept of function occurs at Kalawan, Taxila, where a large acanthus capital set on a lotus base was inserted between the conventional square basement and cylindrical dome of a votive stupa.

Further, in the art of Gandhara, Indo-Corinthian capitals on top of separating pilasters are used extensively in narrative friezes of the life of the Buddha. This usage continued as late as the 5th century.

== Gallery ==
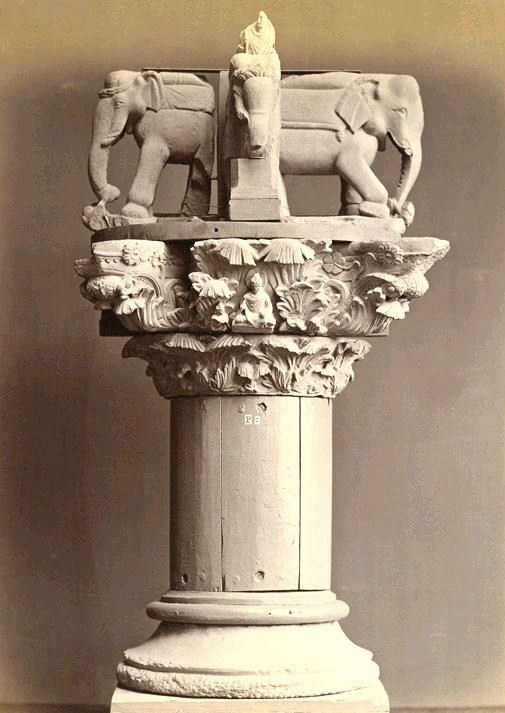
Base of pillar, Indo-Corinthian capitals and elephants from base of stupa, Jamal Garhi

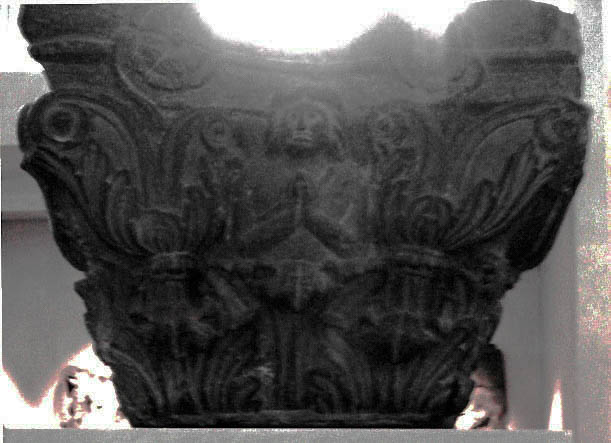
An Indo-Corinthian capital from the Butkara Stupa under which a coin of Azes II was found. Dated to 20 BCE or earlier (Turin City Museum of Ancient Art).

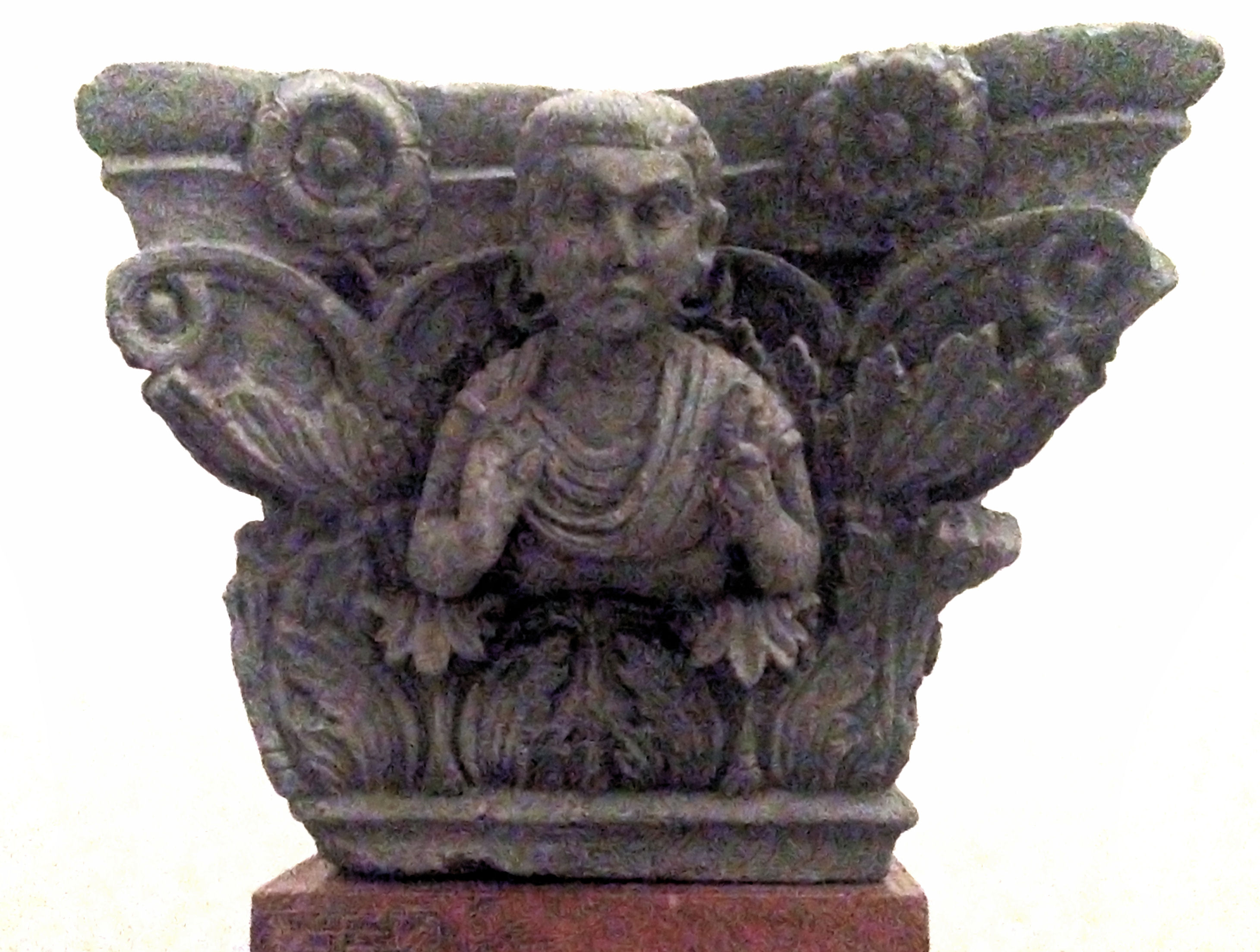
Indo-Corinthian capital representing a Buddhist devotee wearing a Graeco-Roman coat with fibula. Butkara Stupa, National Museum of Oriental Art, Rome.

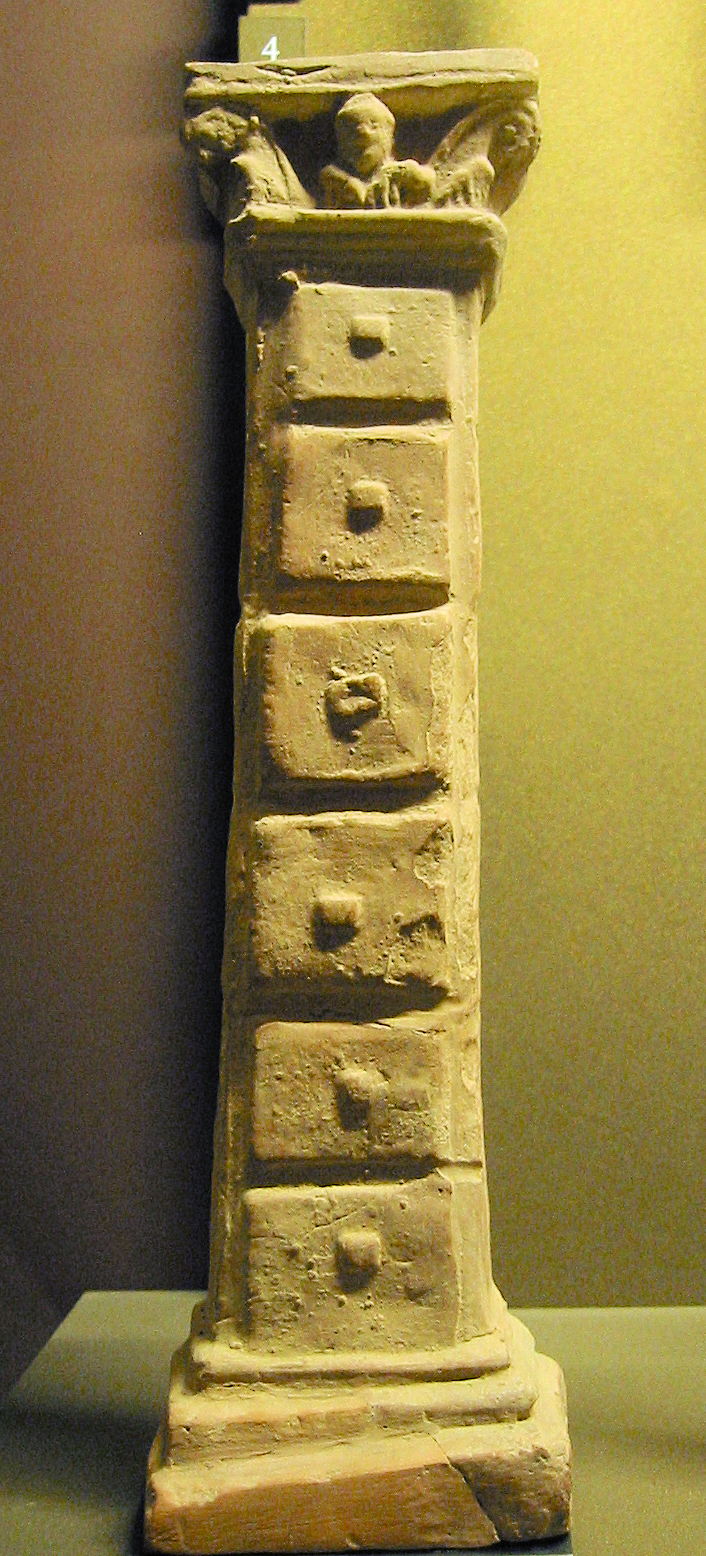
A pilaster decorated by a Corinthian capital and a female figurine, Athens, 2nd-1st century BCE.

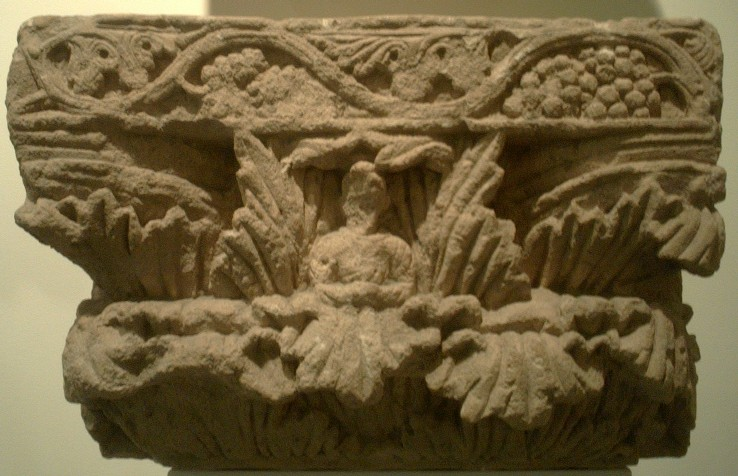
The Buddha, within the foliage of a Corinthian capital.

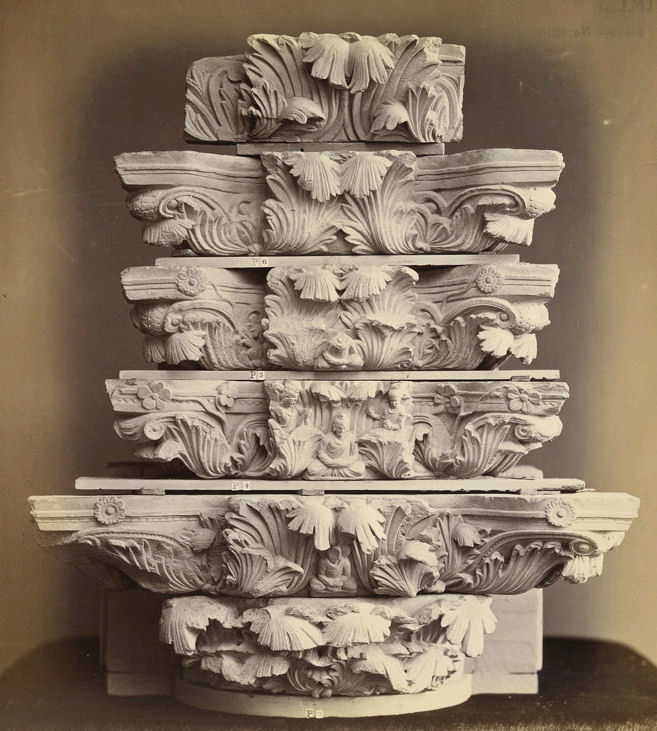
Series of Indo-Corinthian capitals from Jamal-Garhi.

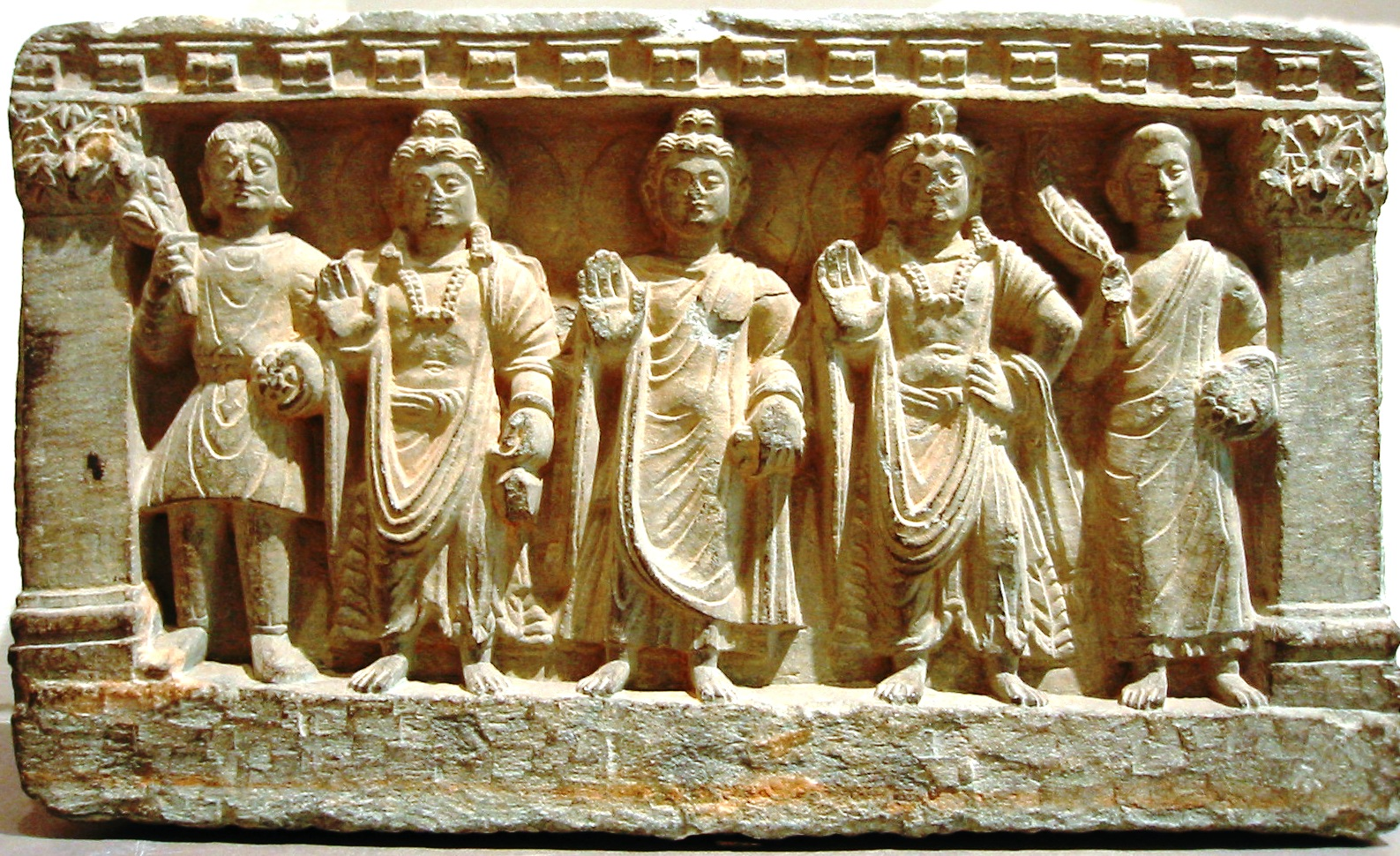
A Buddhist triad flanked by two pilasters with Indo-Corinthian capitals, Gandhara, 3rd century CE.

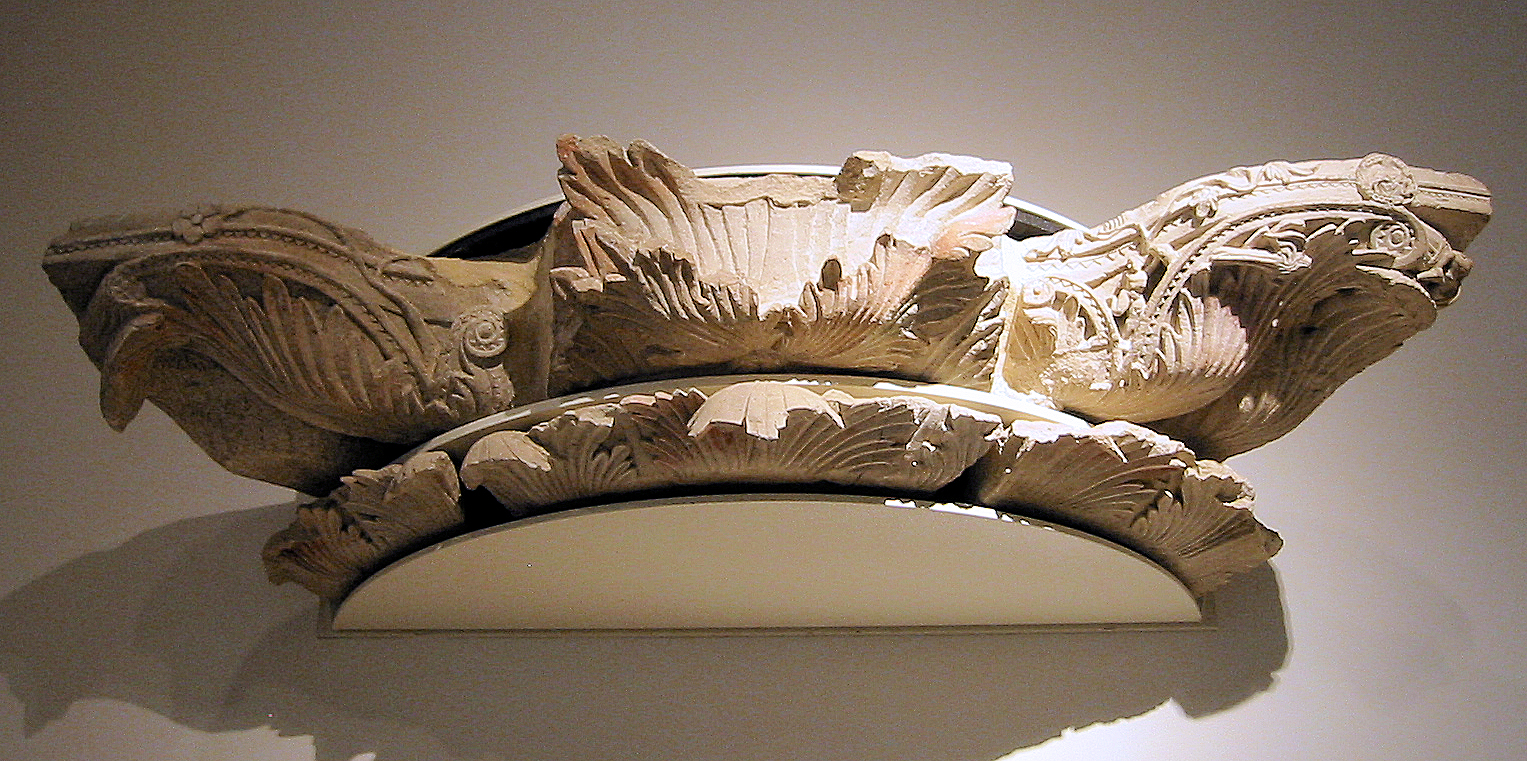
Indo-Corinthian canopy at the Chakhil-i-Ghoundi stupa, Hadda.

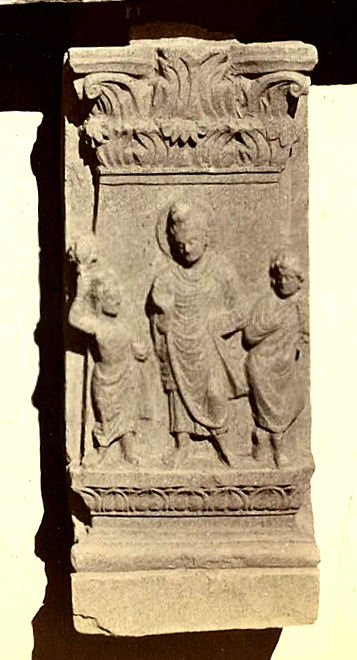
Small Gandhara architectural pillar

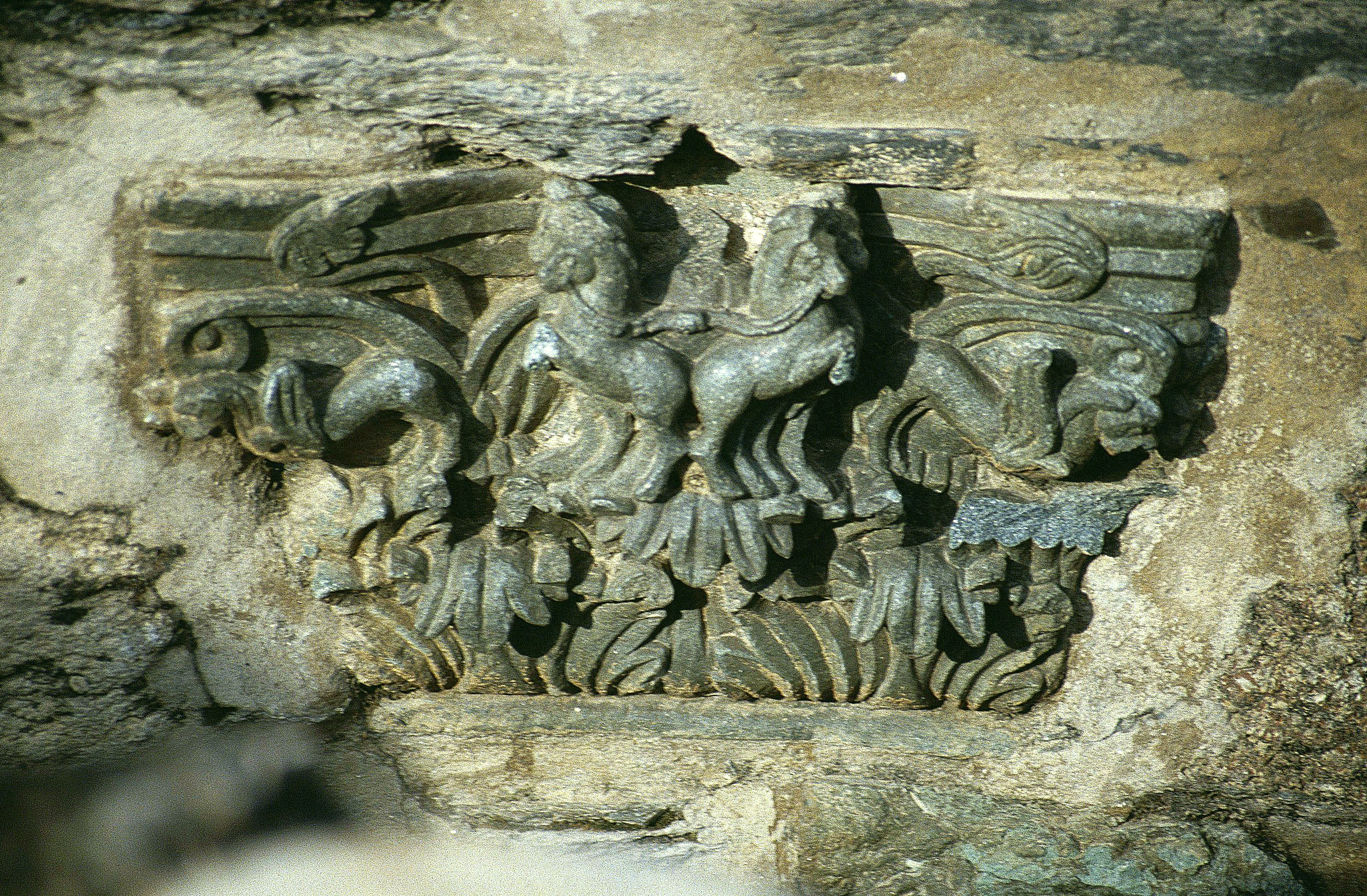
Capital with central quadriga. Butkara Stupa.

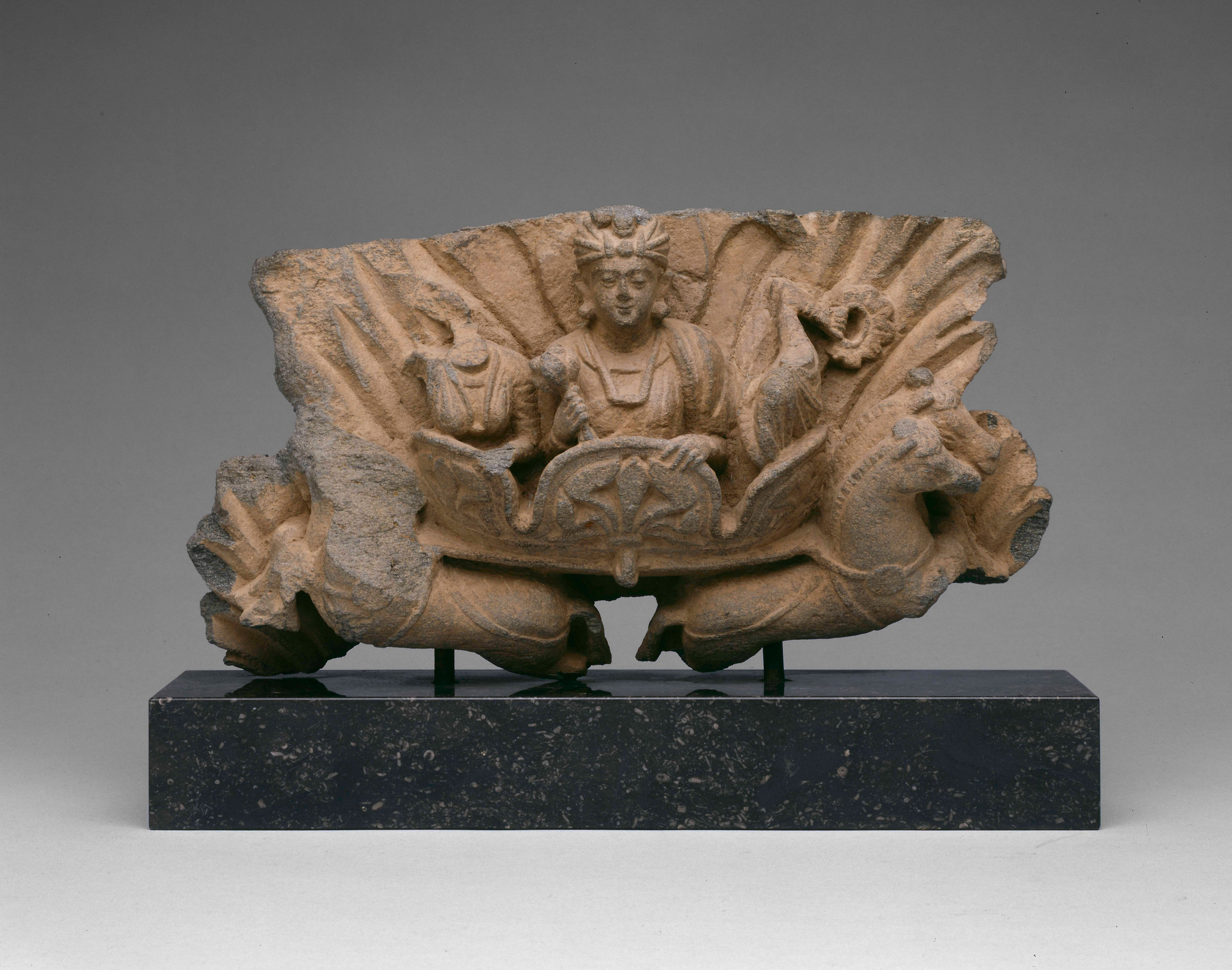
Indo-Corinthian capital featuring the charriot-driving sun god Surya. Gandhara, 2nd century CE.

== See also ==
- Indo-Greek art
- Greco-Buddhist art
