= Apollodotus II =

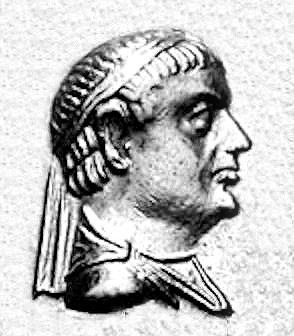
- King Apollodotus II

Indo-Greek king
- Reign: 80–65 BC
- Died: 65 BC

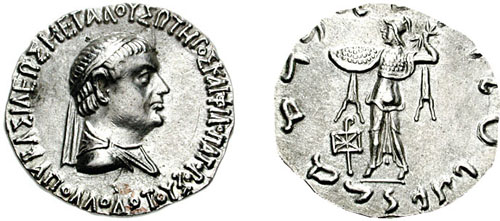
Indo-Greek king Apollodotus II (80–65 BC). Obv.: Bust of king Apollodotus II. Greek legend ΑΠΟΛΛΟΔΟΤΟΥ ΒΑΣΙΛΕΩΣ ΜΕΓΑΛΟΥ ΣΩΤΗΡΟΣ ΚΑΙ ΦΙΛΟΠΑΤΟΡΟΣ "Of Apollodotus the Great, Saviour & Fatherloving King". Rev.: Athena Alkidemos standing left, thunderbolt in raised right hand, holding out aegis with left arm. Legend in Kharoshthi script Tratarasa Maharajasa Apalatasa "Saviour King Appolodotus".

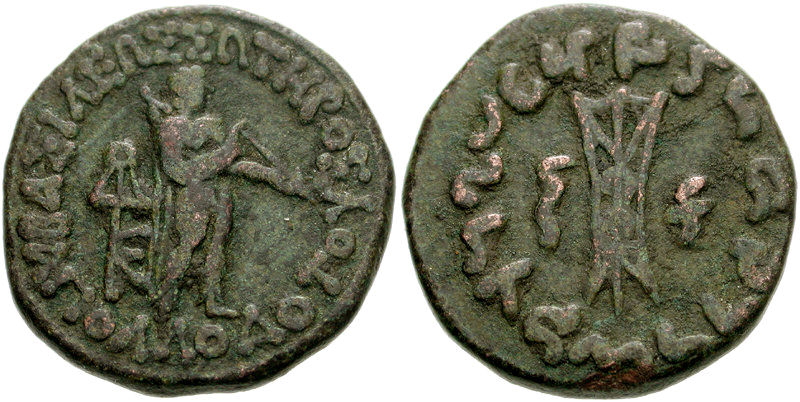
Coin of Apollodotos II (round bilingual).

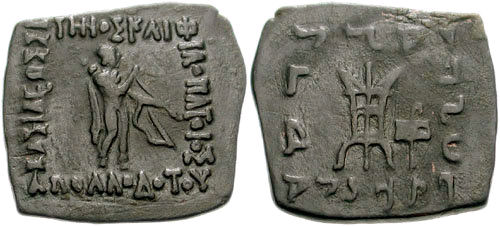
Coin of Apollodotos II (square bilingual, Indian standard). Standing god Apollo, holding an arrow and a Scythian curved bow.

Apollodotus II (Greek: Ἀπολλόδοτος Β΄) was an Indo-Greek king who ruled in the western and eastern parts of Punjab. Bopearachchi dates him to c. 80–65 BC, and R. C. Senior to c. 85–65 BC. Apollodotos II was an important ruler who seems to have re-established the Indo-Greek kingdom to some extent of its former glory. Taxila in western Punjab was reconquered from nomad Scythian rule.

== Rule ==
Apollodotus II seems to have been a member of the dynasty of Menander I, since he used their typical deity Athena Alkidemos on most of his silver, and also Menander's title Soter (Greek: Σωτήρ, "the Saviour"), on all his coins. On some coins, he also calls himself Philopator (Greek: Φιλοπάτωρ, "the father-loving"), which proves that his father had been king before him. R C Senior guesses that Amyntas or Epander could have been his father.

Apollodotus' reign possibly began in the Punjab, when the Scythian king Maues ruled in Gandhara and its capital Taxila. What probably happened is that Apollodotus II took over Taxila after the death of Maues, though it is uncertain whether he defeated Maues or his descendants, or was allied or related to the dynasty of Maues. The late Indo-Greeks may have been rather mixed with both Indians and Scythians. R C Senior suggests that Apollodotus had struck an alliance with another Scythian king, Azes I.

The Scythian hold on Gandhara loosened after the death of Maues, and petty kings of mixed or uncertain origin, like Artemidorus the son of Maues, Telephus and perhaps Menander II emerged in the area. These kings posed no threat to Apollodotus II, who on some of his coins assumed the title Basileus Megas (Greek: Βασιλεὺς Μέγας, "Great King"), in echo of Maues' boastful title "Great King of Kings".

After the death of Apollodotus II, the Indo-Greek kingdom fragmented once more.

== Coins of Apollodotus II ==
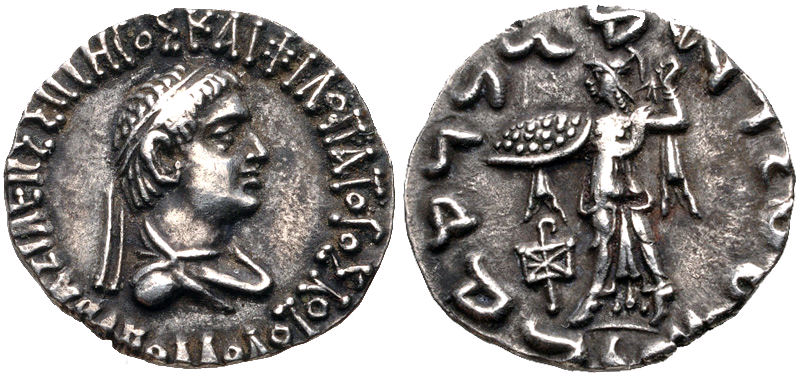
Indo-Greek king Apollodotus II (80–65 BC). Obv.: Greek legend readsΑΠΟΛΛΟΔΟΤΟΥ ΒΑΣΙΛΕΩΣ ΜΕΓΑΛΟΥ ΣΩΤΗΡΟΣ ΚΑΙ ΦΙΛΟΠΑΤΟΡΟΣ, "of Apollodotus King Great Saviour and Fatherloving". Rev.: Legend in Kharoshthi script Tratarasa Maharajasa Apalatasa "Saviour King Appolodotus", with goddess Athena (type of Menander I).

Apollodotus II issued a large number of coins. He struck silver with a diademed portrait on the obverse and a reverse of Athena Alkidemos, and also a unique coin with the reverse of a king, possibly Alexander the Great, sitting on a horned horse similar to Alexander's Bucephalus and holding his hand in a benediction gesture.

He struck bronzes with Apollo/tripod, a type introduced by his namesake Apollodotus I.

The coins of Apollodotus II are of different qualities. Some still have the realistic portraits characteristic of the earlier Indo-Greek coins, and Bopearachchi attributes these series to the western part of his kingdom. Others are badly struck and/or have clumsy and distorted portraits, and these Bopearachchi interprets as belonging to newly opened mints in eastern Punjab, presumably struck by Indian celators with little knowledge of Greek engraving skills.

On some of his coins there are both extra monograms in shape of Kharosthi letters. These monograms are interpreted, which was suggested already by W.W. Tarn, to have belonged to officials with Indian names. The coins therefore indicate that Apollodotus II relied more on his Indian subjects than earlier kings, and also opened new mints in eastern Punjab where Greek presence was scarce.

== Overstrikes ==
Apollodotus II overstruck a bronze of Maues. Zoilos II overstruck some of the coins of Apollodotus II, as did Azes I.

	Greco-Bactrian kings		Indo-Greek kings					
Territories/ dates	West Bactria	East Bactria	Paropamisade	Arachosia	Gandhara	Western Punjab	Eastern Punjab	Mathura
326-325 BCE	Campaigns of Alexander the Great in India						Nanda Empire	
312 BCE	Creation of the Seleucid Empire						Creation of the Maurya Empire	
305 BCE	Seleucid Empire after Mauryan war		Maurya Empire					
280 BCE	Foundation of Ai-Khanoum							
255–239 BCE	Independence of the Greco-Bactrian kingdom Diodotus I		Emperor Ashoka (268-232 BCE)					
239–223 BCE	Diodotus II							
230–200 BCE	Euthydemus I							
200–190 BCE	Demetrius I				Sunga Empire			
190-185 BCE	Euthydemus II							
190–180 BCE	Agathocles			Pantaleon				
185–170 BCE	Antimachus I							
180–160 BCE			Apollodotus I					
175–170 BCE	Demetrius II							
160–155 BCE			Antimachus II					
170–145 BCE	Eucratides I							
155–130 BCE	Yuezhi occupation, loss of Ai-Khanoum	Eucratides II; Plato; Heliocles I	Menander I					
130–120 BCE	Yuezhi occupation		Zoilus I		Agathoclea			Yavanarajya inscription
120–110 BCE			Lysias		Strato I			Yavanarajya inscription
110–100 BCE			Antialcidas		Heliocles II			Yavanarajya inscription
100 BCE			Polyxenus		Demetrius III			Yavanarajya inscription
100–95 BCE			Philoxenus					Yavanarajya inscription
95–90 BCE			Diomedes	Amyntas		Epander		Yavanarajya inscription
90 BCE			Theophilus	Peucolaus		Thraso		Yavanarajya inscription
90–85 BCE			Nicias	Menander II		Artemidorus		Yavanarajya inscription
90–70 BCE			Hermaeus	Archebius				Yavanarajya inscription
			Yuezhi occupation		Maues (Indo-Scythian)			
75–70 BCE				Vonones	Telephus	Apollodotus II		
65–55 BCE				Spalirises		Hippostratus	Dionysius	
55–35 BCE					Azes I (Indo-Scythians)		Zoilus II	
55–35 BCE					Vijayamitra/ Azilises		Apollophanes	
25 BCE – 10 CE				Gondophares	Zeionises	Kharahostes	Strato II; Strato III	
				Gondophares (Indo-Parthian)			Rajuvula (Indo-Scythian)	
			Kujula Kadphises (Kushan Empire)				Bhadayasa (Indo-Scythian)	Sodasa (Indo-Scythian)

Preceded by Maues (as Indo-Scythian king)	Indo-Greek Ruler (in Punjab); 80 – 65 BC	Succeeded by Dionysios (in Eastern Punjab)
Preceded by Maues (as Indo-Scythian king)	Indo-Greek Ruler (in Punjab); 80 – 65 BC	Succeeded by Hippostratos (in Western Punjab)
