= Greco-Buddhism =

Cultural syncretism in Central and South Asia in antiquity

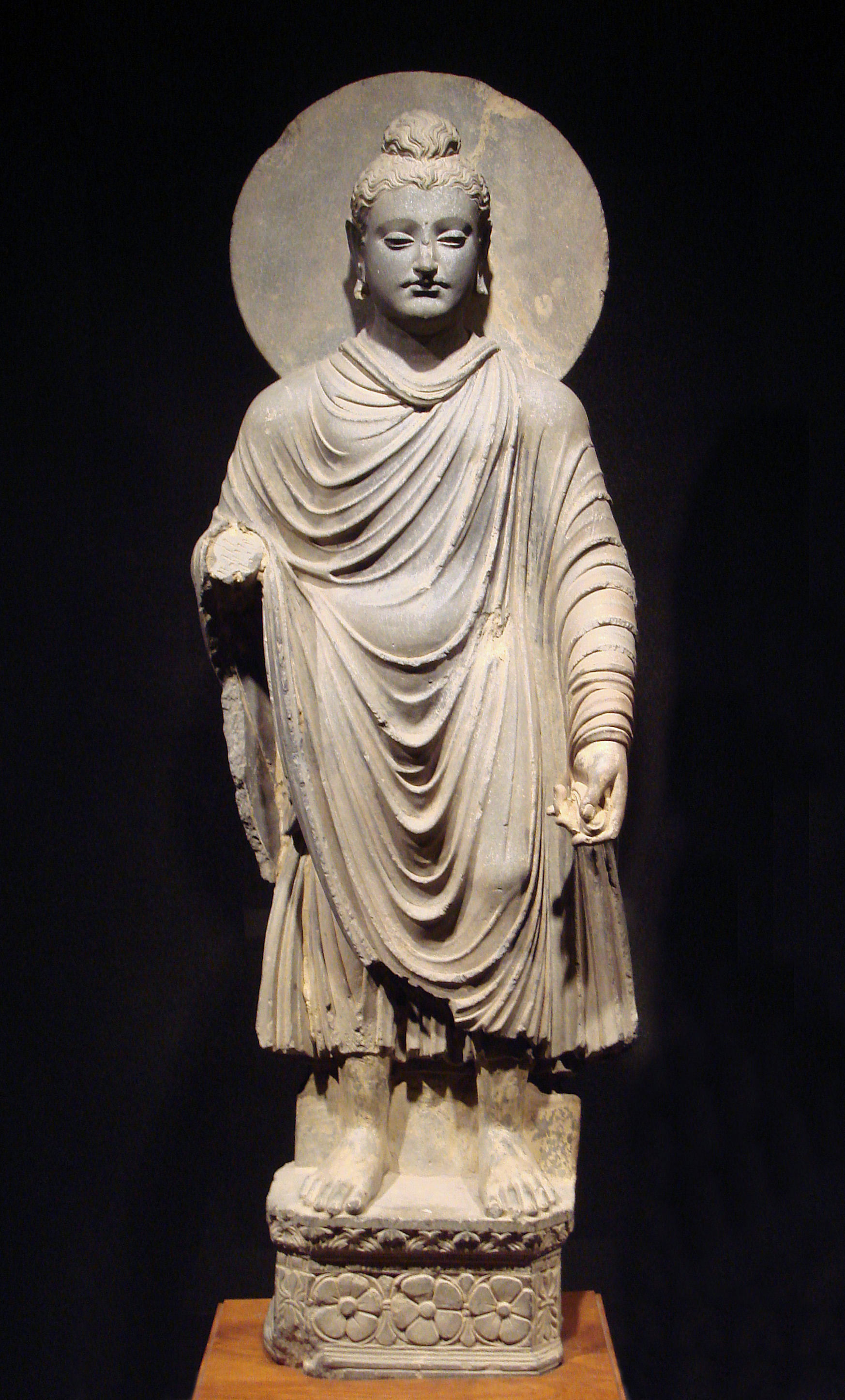
Gautama Buddha in Greco-Buddhist style, 1st–2nd century AD, Gandhara (Peshawar basin, modern-day Pakistan)

Buddhist expansion in Asia: Mahayana Buddhism first entered the Chinese Empire (Han dynasty) through Silk Road during the Kushan Era. The overland and maritime "Silk Roads" were interlinked and complementary, forming what scholars have called the "great circle of Buddhism".

Greco-Buddhism or Graeco-Buddhism was Buddhism within the Hellenistic period of South and Central Asia, resulting in Greek cultural syncretism developing between the 4th century BC and the 5th century AD in Gandhara, which is located in present-day Pakistan and parts of north-east Afghanistan. While the Greco-Buddhist art shows clear Hellenistic influences, the majority of scholars do not assume a noticeable Greek influence on Gandharan Buddhism beyond the artistic realm.

Cultural interactions between ancient Greece and Buddhism date back to Greek forays into the Indian subcontinent from the time of Alexander the Great. A few years after Alexander's death, the easternmost parts of the empire of his general Seleucus were lost in a war to the Mauryan Empire, under Chandragupta Maurya. The Mauryan Emperor Ashoka converted to Buddhism and helped spread the religion throughout his domain, as recorded in the Edicts of Ashoka. Thus, Buddhism reached the Greco-Bactrian kingdom, a successor of the Seleucid Empire.

Following the collapse of the Mauryan Empire, Buddhism continued to flourish under the Greco-Bactrian Kingdom, Indo-Greek Kingdoms, and Kushan Empire. Mahayana Buddhism was spread from the Gangetic plains in India into Gandhara, and then into Central Asia during the Mauryan Era, where it became the most prevalent branch of Buddhism in Central Asia. Mahayana Buddhism was later transmitted through the Silk Road into the Han dynasty during the Kushan period, in the reign of Emperor Kanishka. Buddhist tradition details the monk, Majjhantika of Varanasi, was made responsible for spreading Buddhism in the region by Emperor Ashoka. Later on, the Greco-Bactrian and Indo-Greek king Menander I, who may have converted to Buddhism, supported the spread of the religion as well.

== Historical outline ==
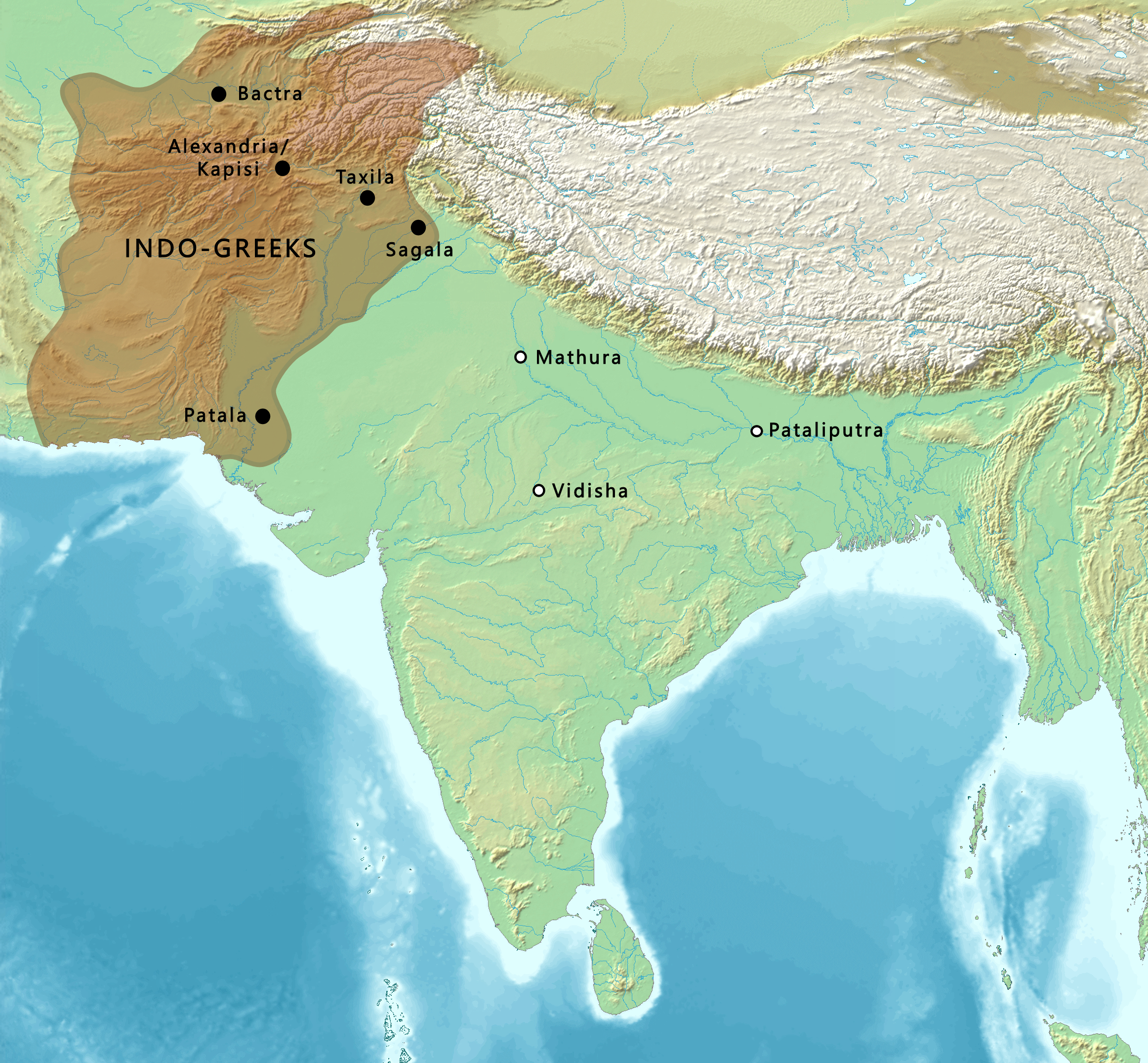
The Indo-Greek Kingdoms in 100–150 BC

The introduction of Hellenistic Greece to central Asia started after the conquest of that region by Darius the Great and his Persian Achaemenid Empire. He and his successors also conquered the Anatolian peninsula, which at the time was inhabited by many Greek cultures. When they rebelled, those Greeks were often ethnically cleansed by being relocated to the far end of the Persian Empire, those central Asian provinces. When Alexander the Great conquered Achaemenid Empire and further regions of Central Asia in 334 BC, he thus encountered many Greeks already established in the easternmost stretches of its empire. He then ventured into Punjab (land of five rivers). Alexander crossed the Indus and Jhelum River when defeating Porus and appointing him as a satrap following the Battle of the Hydaspes. Alexander's army would mutiny and retreat along the Beas River when confronted by the Nanda Empire, thus would not conquer Punjab entirely.

Thanks to relocation by the Persian Empire, there was established Greek culture in the far east of Alexander's empire. He founded several cities in his new territories in the areas of the Amu Darya and Bactria, and Greek settlements further extended to the Khyber Pass, Gandhara (see Taxila), and the Punjab. Following Alexander's death on 10 June 323 BC, the Diadochi or "successors" founded their own kingdoms. General Seleucus set up the Seleucid Empire in Anatolia and Central Asia and extended as far as India.

The Mauryan Empire, founded by Chandragupta Maurya, would first conquer the Nanda Empire. Chandragupta would then defeat the Seleucid Empire during the Seleucid-Mauryan War. This resulted in the transfer of the Macedonian satraps in the Indus Valley and Gandhara to the Mauryan Empire. Furthermore, a marriage alliance was enacted which granted Seleucus's daughter as Chandragupta's wife for diplomatic relations. The conflict additionally led to the transfer of 500 war elephants to the Seleucid Empire from the Mauryan Empire, presumably as reparations for lives lost and damages sustained.

The Mauryan Emperor Ashoka established the largest Indian empire. Following the destructive Kalinga War, Ashoka converted to Buddhism. Abandoning an expansionist agenda, Ashoka would adopt humanitarian reformation in place. As ascribed in the Edicts of Ashoka, the Emperor spread Dharma, interpreted as Buddhism throughout his empire. Ashoka claims to have converted many, including the Greek populations within his realm to Buddhism:

Here in the king's domain among the Greeks, the Kambojas, the Nabhakas, the Nabhapamkits, the Bhojas, the Pitinikas, the Andhras, and the Palidas, everywhere people are following Beloved-of-the-Gods' instructions in Dharma.

The decline and overthrow of the Mauryans by the Shunga Empire, and of the revolt of Bactria in the Seleucid Empire led to the formation of the Greco-Bactrian Kingdom (250–125 BC). To their north, the Greco-Bactrians were followed by the secession of the Indo-Greek Kingdom (180 BC – 10 AD). Even when, centuries later, these Hellenized regions were conquered first by the Yuezhi, then by the Indo-Scythians and the Kushan Empire (1st–3rd centuries AD), Buddhism continued to thrive there.

Buddhism in India was a major religion for centuries until a major Hindu revival from around the 5th century, with remaining strongholds such as Bengal largely ended during the Islamic invasions of India.

== Cultural interaction ==
The length of the Greek presence in Central Asia and northern India provided opportunities for interaction, not only on the artistic but also on the religious plane.

=== Alexander the Great in Bactria and India (331–325 BC) ===
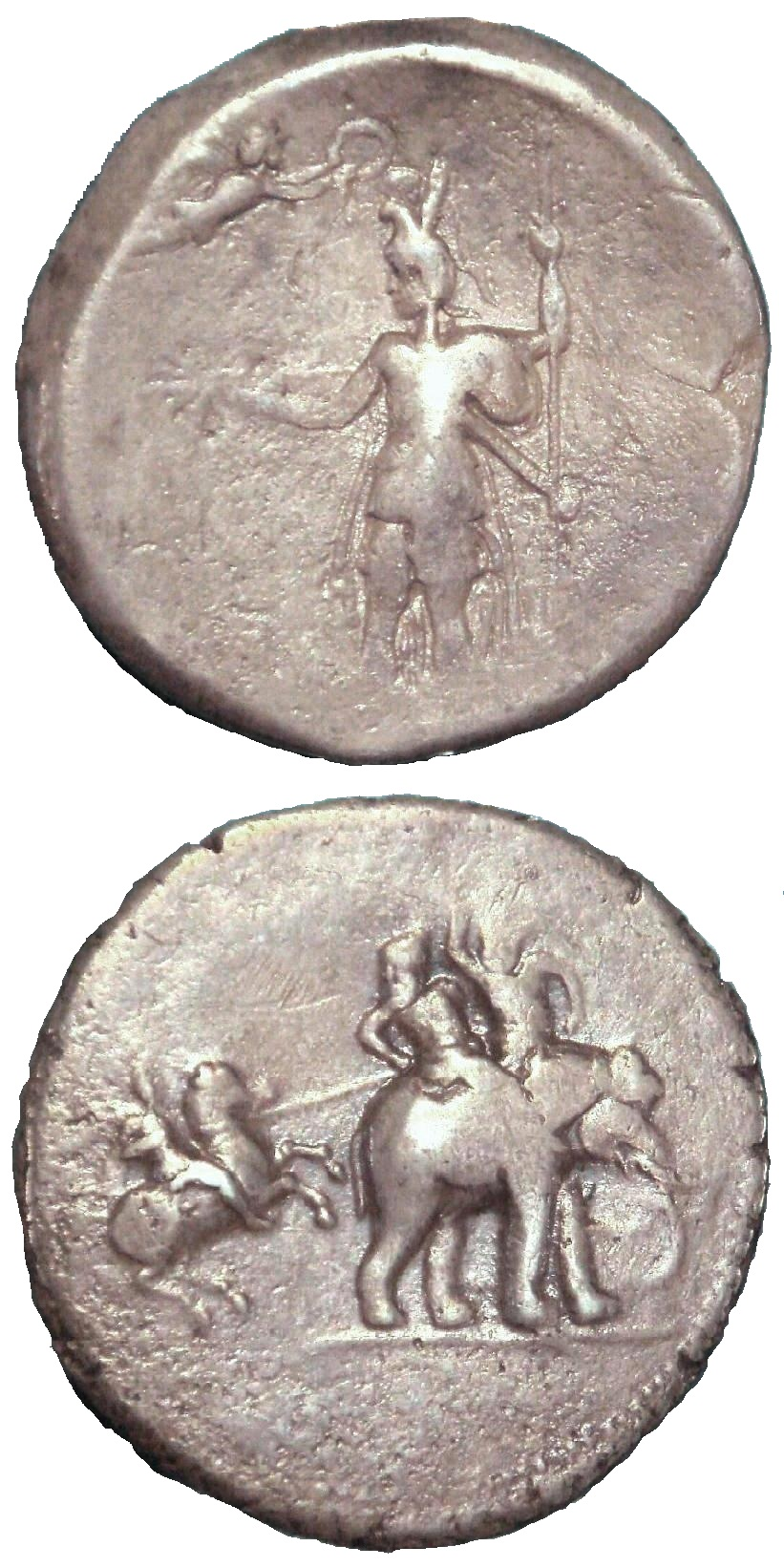
"Victory coin" of Alexander the Great, minted in Babylon 322 BC, following his campaigns in ancient India. Obverse: Alexander being crowned by Nike. Reverse: Alexander attacking King Porus on his elephant. Silver. British Museum.

When Alexander invaded Bactria and Gandhara, these areas may already have been under Sramanic influence, likely Buddhist and Jain. According to a legend preserved in the Pali Canon, two merchant brothers from Kamsabhoga in Bactria, Tapassu and Bhallika, visited Gautama Buddha and became his disciples. The legend states that they then returned home and spread the Buddha's teaching. In 326 BC, Alexander conquered the Northern region of India. King Ambhi of Taxila, known as Taxiles, surrendered his city, a notable Buddhist center, to Alexander. Alexander fought a battle against King Porus of Pauravas in Punjab, the Battle of the Hydaspes in 326 BC.

=== Mauryan Empire (322–183 BC) ===
The Mauryan Empire would later defeat the successor Seleucid Empire, during the Seleucid-Mauryan War. Resulting in the transfer of the satraps in the Indus Valley and Gandhara, that had been part of the Achaemenid, Macedonian and Seleucidian, to the Mauryan Empire. However, contacts were kept with his Greco-Iranian neighbors in the Seleucid Empire. Emperor Seleucus I Nicator came to a marital agreement as part of a peace treaty, and several Greeks, such as the historian Megasthenes, resided at the Mauryan court.

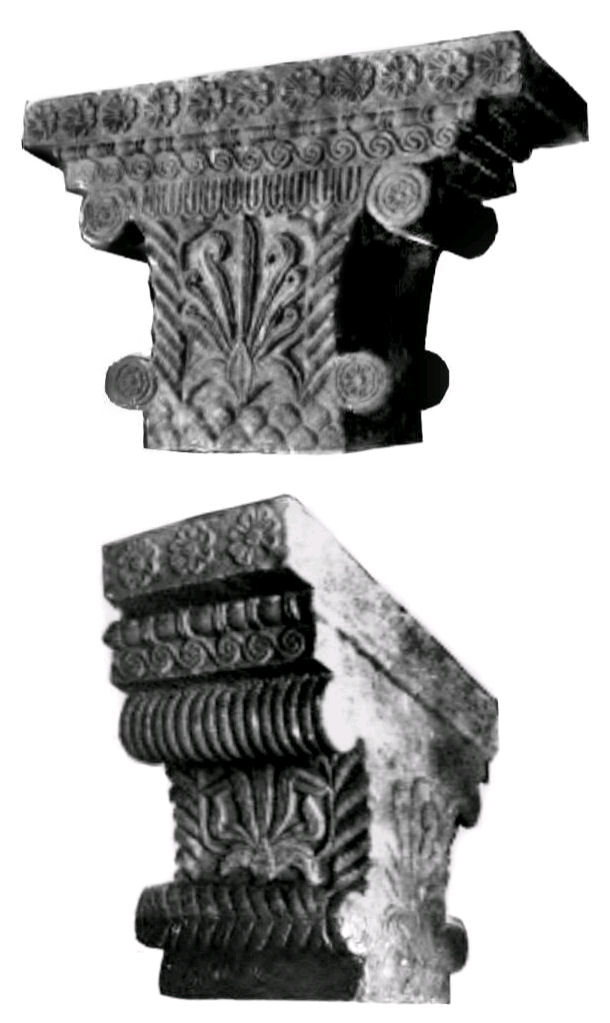
The Hellenistic Pataliputra capital, discovered in Pataliputra, capital of the Maurya Empire, dated to the 3rd century BC

Chandragupta's grandson Ashoka embraced the Buddhist faith and became a great proselytizer in the line of the traditional Pali canon of Theravada Buddhism, insisting on non-violence to humans and animals (ahimsa), and general precepts regulating the life of laypeople.

According to the Edicts of Ashoka, set in stone, some of them written in Greek and some in Aramaic, the official language of the Achaemenids, he sent Buddhist emissaries to the Greek lands in Asia and as far as the Mediterranean. The edicts name each of the rulers of the Hellenistic period:

The conquest by Dharma has been won here, on the borders, and even six hundred yojanas [4,000 miles] away, where the Greek king Antiochos (Antiyoga) rules, and beyond there where the four kings named Ptolemy (Turamaya), Antigonos (Antikini), Magas (Maka) and Alexander (Alikasu[n]dara) rule, likewise in the south among the Cholas, the Pandyas, and as far as Tamraparni.

Ashoka also claims he converted to Buddhism Greek populations within his realm:

Here in the king's domain among the Greeks, the Kambojas, the Nabhakas, the Nabhapamkits, the Bhojas, the Pitinikas, the Andhras and the Palidas, everywhere people are following Beloved-of-the-Gods' instructions in Dharma.

Finally, some of the emissaries of Ashoka, such as the famous Dharmaraksita, are described in Pali sources as leading Greek ("Yona") Buddhist monks active in Buddhist proselytism (the Mahavamsa, XII), founding the eponymous Dharmaguptaka school of Buddhism.

=== Greek presence in Bactria (325–125 BC) ===
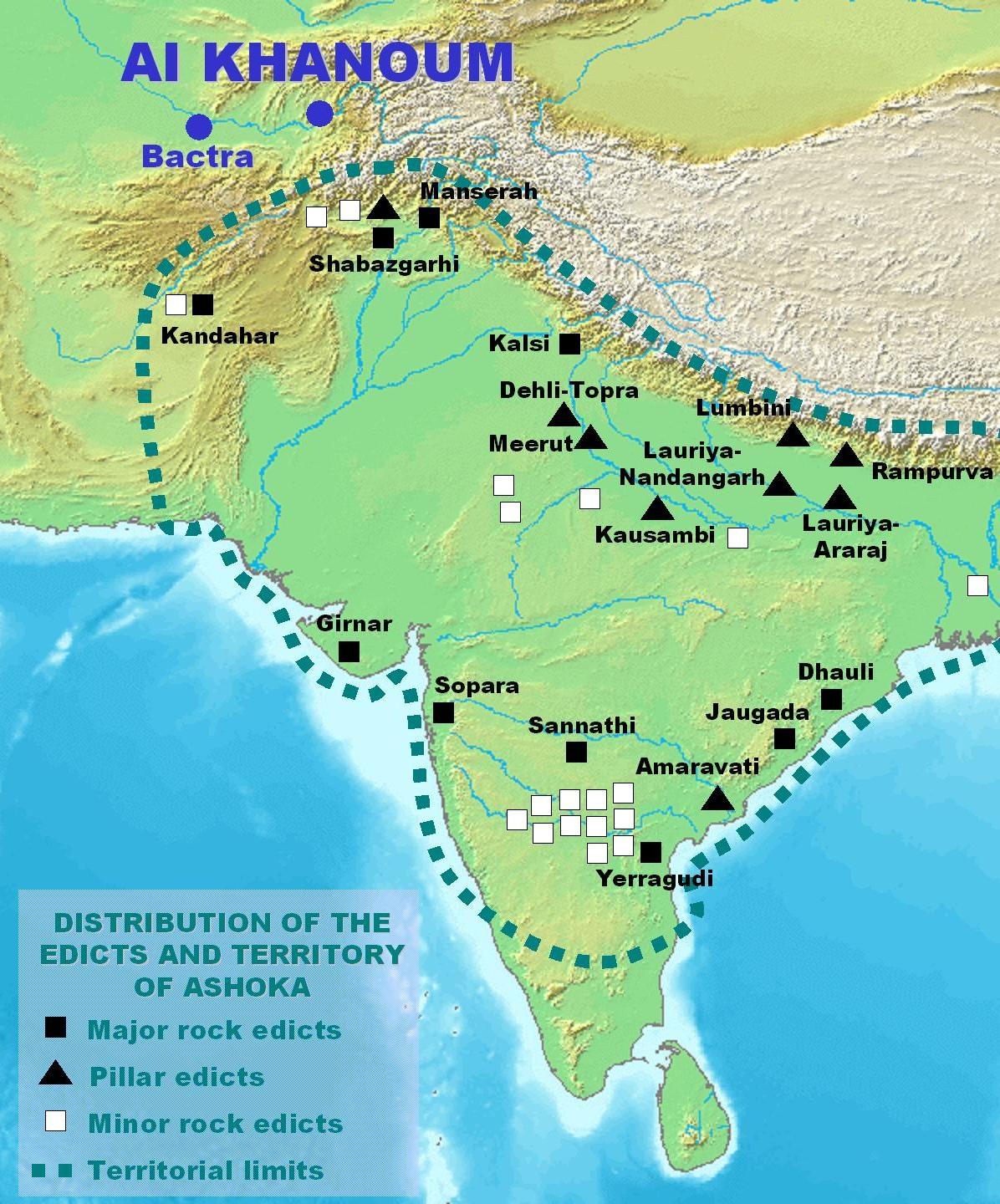
The Greco-Bactrian city of Ai-Khanoum (c. 300–145 BC) was located at the doorstep of ancient India.

Alexander had established in Bactria several cities (such as Ai-Khanoum and Bagram) and an administration that were to last more than two centuries under the Seleucid Empire and the Greco-Bactrian Kingdom, all the time in direct contact with Indian territory. The Greeks sent ambassadors to the court of the Maurya Empire, such as the historian Megasthenes under Chandragupta Maurya, and later Deimachus under his son Bindusara, who reported extensively on the civilization of the Indians. Megasthenes sent detailed reports on Indian religions, which were circulated and quoted throughout the Classical world for centuries:

Megasthenes makes a different division of the philosophers, saying that they are of two kinds, one of which he calls the Brachmanes, and the other the Sarmanes...

— Strabo XV. 1. 58-60

The Greco-Bactrians maintained a strong Hellenistic culture at the door of India during the rule of the Maurya Empire in India, as exemplified by the archaeological site of Ai-Khanoum. When the Maurya Empire was toppled by the Shunga Empire around 180 BC, the Greco-Bactrians expanded into India, where they established the Indo-Greek Kingdom, under which Buddhism was able to flourish.

=== Indo-Greek Kingdom and Buddhism (180 BC – 10 AD) ===
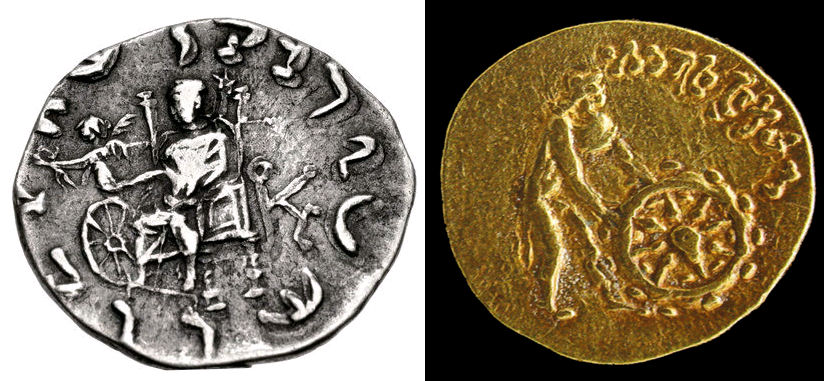
Greek gods and the "Wheel of the Law" or Dharmachakra: Left: Zeus holding Nike, who hands a victory wreath over a Dharmachakra (coin of Menander II). Right: Divinity wearing chlamys and petasus pushing a Dharmachakra, with legend "He who sets in motion the Wheel of the Law" (Tillya Tepe Buddhist coin).

Northern India was the Indo-Greek Kingdom, centered approximately around Alexandria Eschate. They controlled various areas of the northern Indian territory until 10 AD. Buddhism prospered under the Indo-Greek kings, and it has been suggested that their invasion of India was intended to protect the Buddhist faith from the religious persecutions of the Shungas (185–73 BC), who had overthrown the Mauryans. Zarmanochegas was a śramana (possibly, but not necessarily a Buddhist) who, according to ancient historians such as Strabo, Cassius Dio, and Nicolaus of Damascus traveled to Antioch and Athens while Augustus (died 14 AD) was ruling the Roman Empire.

==== Coinage ====
The coins of the Indo-Greek king Menander I (r. 160–135 BC), found from Afghanistan to central India, bear the inscription "Saviour King Menander" in Greek on the front. Several Indo-Greek kings after Menander, such as Zoilos I, Strato I, Heliokles II, Theophilos, Peukolaos, Menander II, and Archebius display on their coins the title "Maharajasa Dharmika" (lit. "King of the Dharma") in Prakrit written in Kharoshthi.

Some of the coins of Menander I and Menander II incorporate the Buddhist symbol of the eight-spoked wheel, associated with the Greek symbols of victory, either the palm of victory, or the victory wreath handed over by the goddess Nike. According to the Milinda Pañha, at the end of his reign Menander I became a Buddhist arhat, a fact also echoed by Plutarch, who explains that his relics were shared and enshrined.

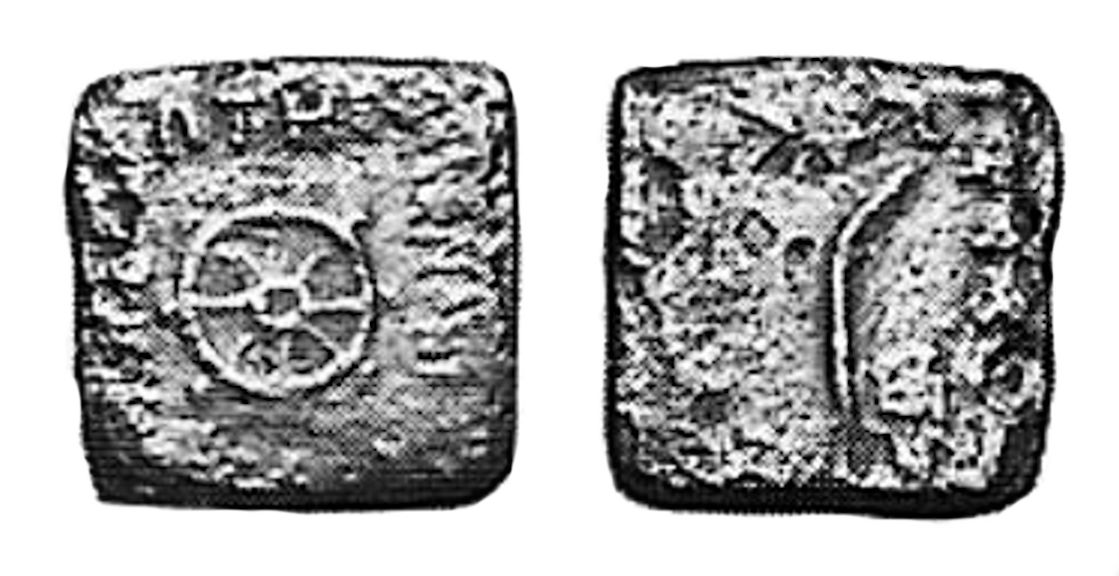
A coin of Menander I (r. 160 – 135 BC) with a dharmacakra and a palm

The ubiquitous symbol of the elephant in Indo-Greek coinage may also have been associated with Buddhism, as suggested by the parallel between coins of Antialcidas and Menander II, where the elephant in the coins of Antialcidas holds the same relationship to Zeus and Nike as the Buddhist wheel on the coins of Menander II. When the Zoroastrian Indo-Parthian Kingdom invaded North India in the 1st century AD, they adopted a large part of the symbolism of Indo-Greek coinage, but refrained from ever using the elephant, suggesting that its meaning was not merely geographical.

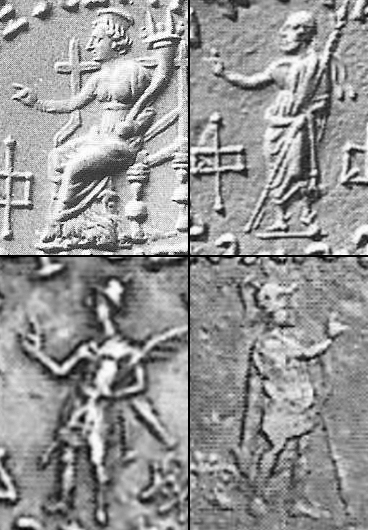
Vitarka Mudra gestures on Indo-Greek coinage. Top: Divinities Tyche and Zeus. Bottom: Depiction of the Indo-Greek kings Nicias and Menander II.

Finally, after the reign of Menander I, several Indo-Greek rulers, such as Amyntas Nikator, Nicias, Peukolaos, Hermaeus, Hippostratos and Menander II, depicted themselves or their Greek deities forming with the right hand a benediction gesture identical to the Buddhist vitarka mudra (thumb and index joined together, with other fingers extended), which in Buddhism signifies the transmission of Buddha's teaching.

==== Cities ====
According to Ptolemy, Greek cities were founded by the Greco-Bactrians in northern India. Menander established his capital in Sagala (modern Sialkot, Punjab, Pakistan) one of the centers of the blossoming Buddhist culture. A large Greek city built by Demetrius and rebuilt by Menander has been excavated at the archaeological site of Sirkap near Taxila, where Buddhist stupas were standing side-by-side with Hindu and Greek temples, indicating religious tolerance and syncretism.

==== Scriptures ====
Evidence of direct religious interaction between Greek and Buddhist thought during the period include the Milinda Pañha or "Questions of Menander", a Pali-language discourse in the Platonic style held between Menander I and the Buddhist monk Nagasena.

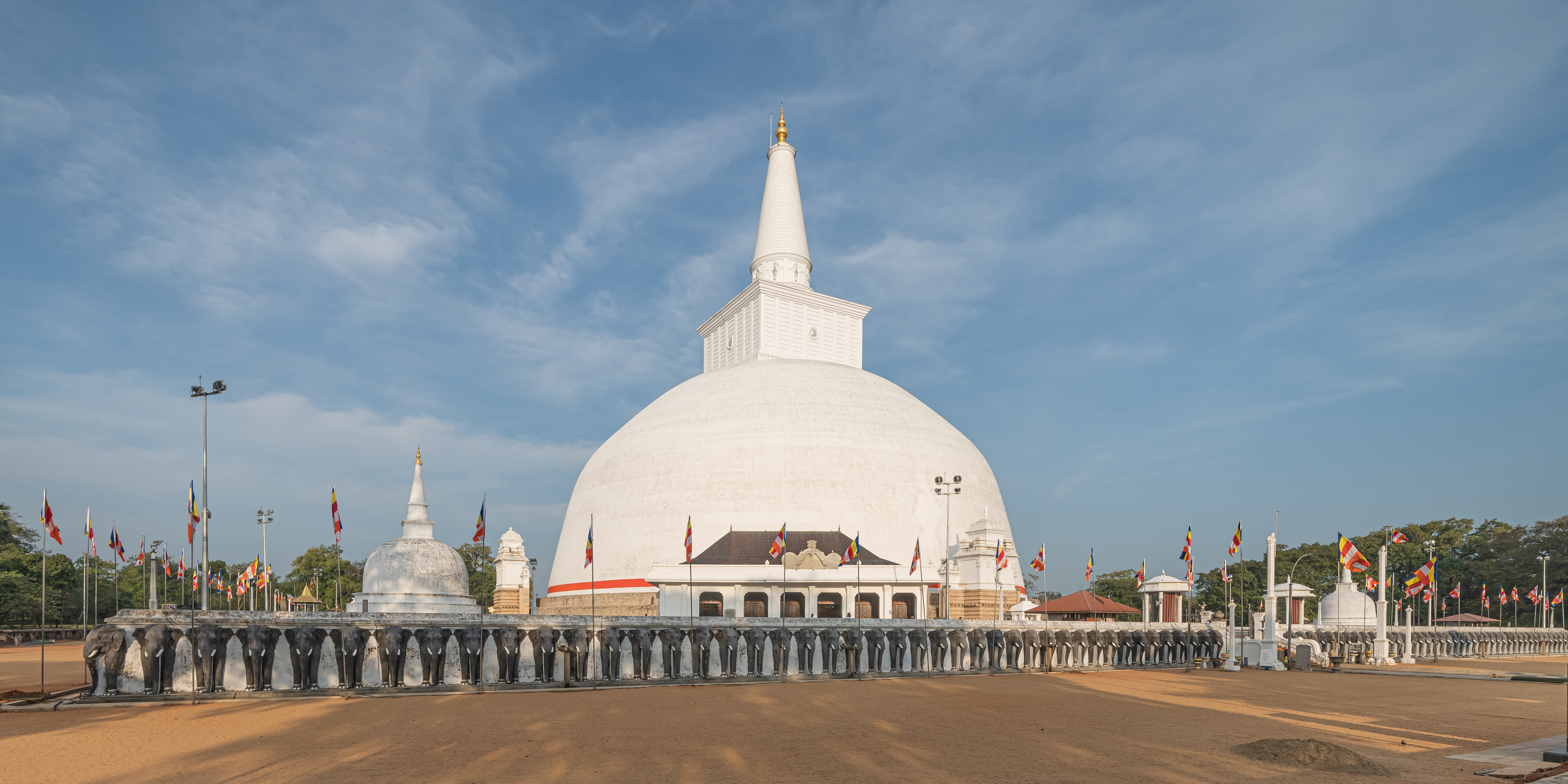
According to the Mahavamsa, the Ruwanwelisaya in Anuradhapura, Sri Lanka, was dedicated by a 30,000-strong Yona delegation from Alexandria on the Caucasus (c. 130 BC).

The Mahavamsa, chapter 29, records that during Menander's reign, a Greek thera (elder monk) named Mahadharmaraksita led 30,000 Buddhist monks from "the Greek city of Alexandria" (possibly Alexandria on the Caucasus, around 150 kilometres (93 mi) north of today's Kabul in Afghanistan), to Sri Lanka for the dedication of a stupa, indicating that Buddhism flourished in Menander's territory and that Greeks took a very active part in it.

Several Buddhist dedications by Greeks in India are recorded, such as that of the Greek meridarch (civil governor of a province) named Theodorus, describing in Kharosthi how he enshrined relics of the Buddha. The inscriptions were found on a vase inside a stupa, dated to the reign of Menander or one of his successors in the 1st century BC. Finally, Buddhist tradition recognizes Menander as one of the great benefactors of the faith, together with Ashoka and Kanishka the Great.

Buddhist manuscripts in cursive Greek have been found in Afghanistan, praising various Buddhas and including mentions of the Mahayana figure of "Lokesvararaja Buddha" (λωγοασφαροραζοβοδδο). These manuscripts have been dated later than the 2nd century CE.

=== Kushan empire (1st–3rd century AD) ===
The Kushan Empire, one of the five tribes of the Yuezhi, settled in Bactria around 125 BC, displacing the Greco-Bactrians and invading the northern parts of Pakistan and India from around 1 AD. By that time they had already been in contact with Greek culture and the Indo-Greek kingdoms for more than a century. They used the Greek script to write their language, as exemplified by their coins and their adoption of the Greek alphabet.

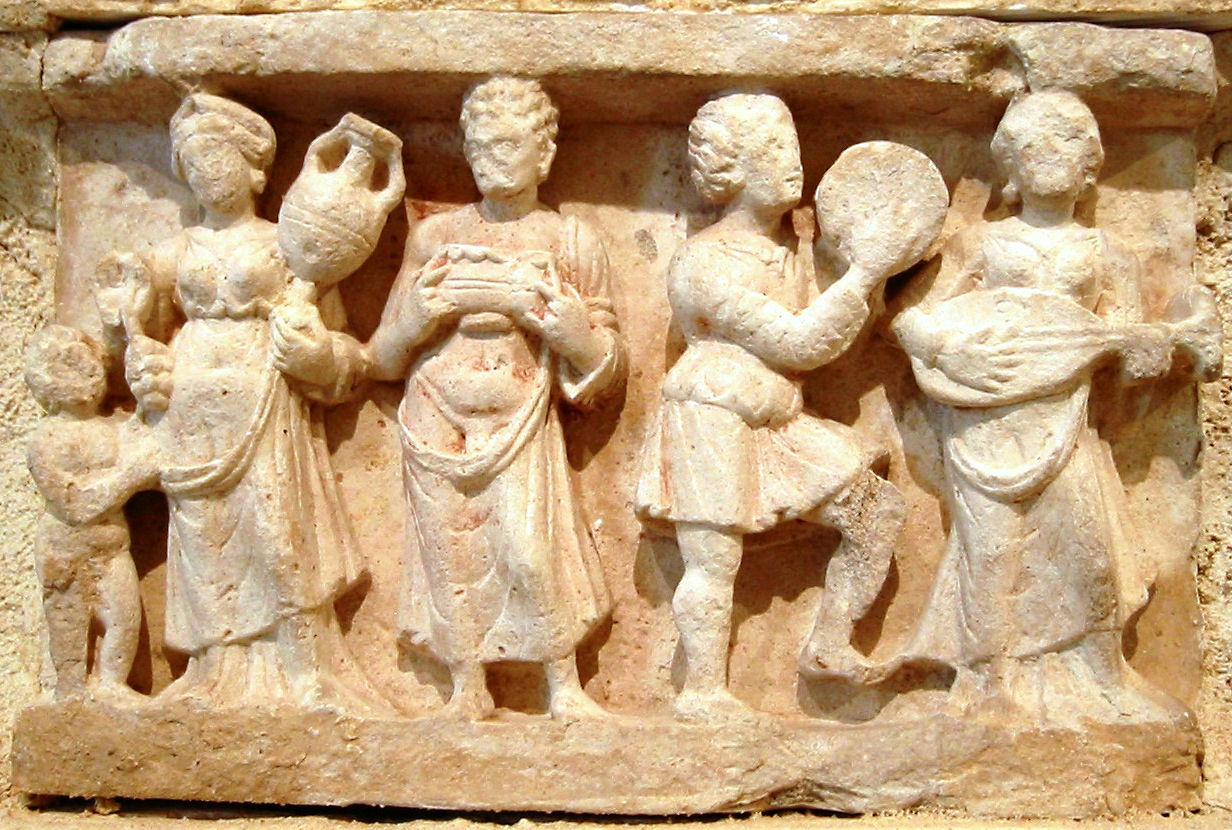
Hellenistic culture in the Indian subcontinent: Greek clothes, amphoras, wine and music. Detail from Chakhil-i-Ghoundi Stupa, Hadda, Gandhara, 1st century AD.

The Kushan King Kanishka, who honored Zoroastrian, Greek and Brahmanic deities as well as the Buddha and was famous for his religious syncretism, convened the Fourth Buddhist council around 100 in Kashmir in order to redact the Sarvastivadin canon. Some of Kanishka's coins bear the earliest representations of the Buddha on a coin (around 120), in Hellenistic style and with the word "Boddo" in Greek script. Kanishka also had the original Gandhari Prakrit Mahāyāna sūtras translated into Sanskrit, "a turning point in the evolution of the Buddhist literary canon" The Kanishka casket, dated to the first year of Kanishka's reign in 127, was signed by a Greek artist named Agesilas, who oversaw work at Kanishka's stupas (cetiya), confirming the direct involvement of Greeks with Buddhist realizations at such a late date.

== Philosophical influences ==
Several Greek philosophers, including Pyrrho, Anaxarchus, and Onesicritus accompanied Alexander in his eastern campaigns. During the 18 months they were in India, they were able to interact with Indian philosophers who pursued asceticism, generally described as gymnosophists ("naked philosophers").

=== Pyrrhonism ===
Pyrrho returned to Greece and founded Pyrrhonism, considered by modern scholars as the first Western school of skepticism. The Greek biographer Diogenes Laërtius explained that Pyrrho's equanimity and detachment from the world were acquired in India.

Pyrrho was directly influenced by Buddhism in developing his philosophy, which is based on Pyrrho's interpretation of the Buddhist three marks of existence.

=== Cynicism ===
Another of these philosophers, Onesicritus, a Cynic, is said by Strabo to have learnt in India the following precepts: "That nothing that happens to a man is bad or good, opinions being merely dreams. ... That the best philosophy [is] that which liberates the mind from [both] pleasure and grief". Cynicism, particularly the Cynic Peregrinus Proteus was further influenced by the tales of the gymnosophists, particularly the examples set by Kalanos, Dandamis, and Zarmanochegas.

=== Cyrenaicism ===
The Cyrenaic philosopher Hegesias of Cyrene, from the city of Cyrene where Magas of Cyrene ruled, is thought by some to have been influenced by the teachings of Ashoka's Buddhist missionaries.

== Artistic influences ==
Numerous works of Greco-Buddhist art display the intermixing of Greek and Buddhist influences in such creation centers as Gandhara. The subject matter of Gandharan art was definitely Buddhist, while most motifs were of Western Asiatic or Hellenistic origin.

=== Anthropomorphic representation of the Buddha ===
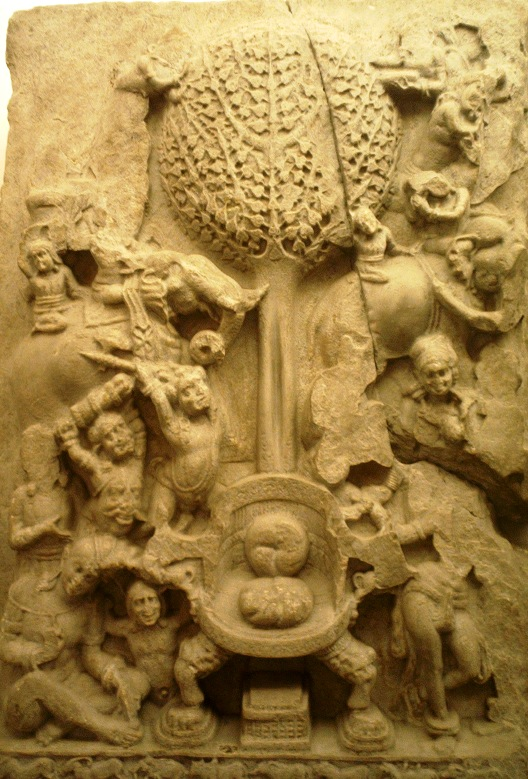
An aniconic representation of Mara's assault on the Buddha, 2nd century AD, Amaravathi village, Guntur district, India.

Although there is still some debate, the first anthropomorphic representations of the Buddha himself are often considered a result of the Greco-Buddhist interaction. Before this innovation, Buddhist art was "aniconic": the Buddha was only represented through his symbols (an empty throne, the Bodhi Tree, Buddha footprints, the Dharmachakra).

This reluctance towards anthropomorphic representations of the Buddha, and the sophisticated development of aniconic symbols to avoid it (even in narrative scenes where other human figures would appear), seem to be connected to one of the Buddha's sayings reported in the Digha Nikaya that discouraged representations of himself after the extinction of his body.

Probably not feeling bound by these restrictions, and because of "their cult of form, the Greeks were the first to attempt a sculptural representation of the Buddha". In many parts of the Ancient World, the Greeks did develop syncretic divinities, that could become a common religious focus for populations with different traditions: a well-known example is Serapis, introduced by Ptolemy I Soter in Hellenistic Egypt, who combined aspects of Greek and Egyptian gods. In India as well, it was only natural for the Greeks to create a single common divinity by combining the image of a Greek god-king (Apollo, or possibly the deified founder of the Indo-Greek Kingdom, Demetrius I of Bactria), with the traditional physical characteristics of the Buddha.

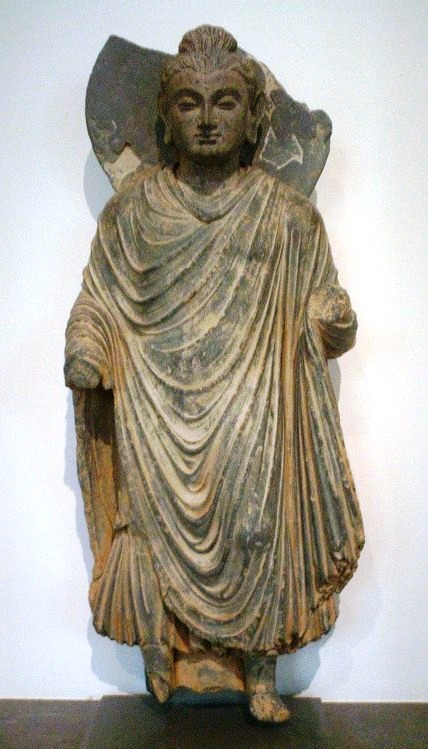
Standing Buddha, Gandhara, 1st century AD.

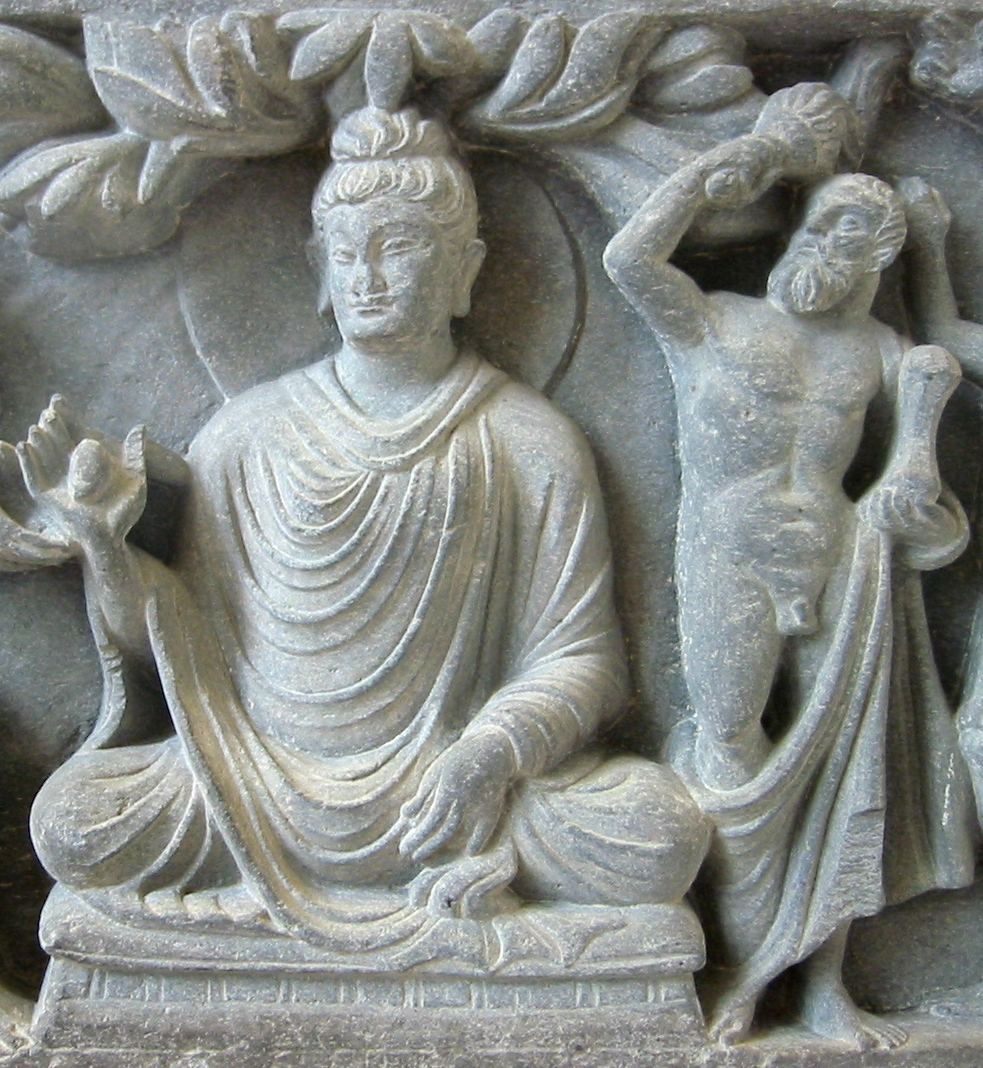
Herculean depiction of Vajrapani (right), as the protector of the Buddha, 2nd-century AD Gandhara, British Museum.

Many of the stylistic elements in the representations of the Buddha point to Greek influence: himation, the contrapposto stance of the upright figures, such as the 1st–2nd century Gandhara standing Buddhas, the stylized curly hair and ushnisha apparently derived from the style of the Apollo Belvedere (330 BC) and the measured quality of the faces, all rendered with strong artistic realism. A large quantity of sculptures combining Buddhist and purely Hellenistic styles and iconography were excavated at the modern site of Hadda, Afghanistan. The curly hair of Shakyamuni Buddha is described in the famous list of the physical characteristics of the Buddha in the Buddhist sutras. The hair with curls turning to the right is first described in the Pāli canon; we find the same description in the Dāsāṣṭasāhasrikā prajñāpāramitā. Additionally, the nudity of Jainist sculptures might have been inspired by Apollonian archetypes.

Greek artists were most probably the authors of these early representations of the Buddha, in particular the standing statues, which display "a realistic treatment of the folds and on some even a hint of modelled volume that characterizes the best Greek work. This is Classical or Hellenistic Greek, not archaizing Greek transmitted by Persia or Bactria, nor distinctively Roman."

The Greek stylistic influence on the representation of the Buddha, through its idealistic realism, also permitted a very accessible, understandable and attractive visualization of the ultimate state of enlightenment described by Buddhism, allowing it to reach a wider audience:

One of the distinguishing features of the Gandharan school of art that emerged in north-west India is that it has been clearly influenced by the naturalism of the Classical Greek style. Thus, while these images still convey the inner peace that results from putting the Buddha's doctrine into practice, they also give us an impression of people who walked and talked, etc. and slept much as we do. I feel this is very important. These figures are inspiring because they do not only depict the goal, but also the sense that people like us can achieve it if we try.

— 14th Dalai Lama

During the following centuries, this anthropomorphic representation of the Buddha defined the canon of Buddhist art, but progressively evolved to incorporate more Indian and Asian elements.

=== Hellenized Buddhist pantheon ===
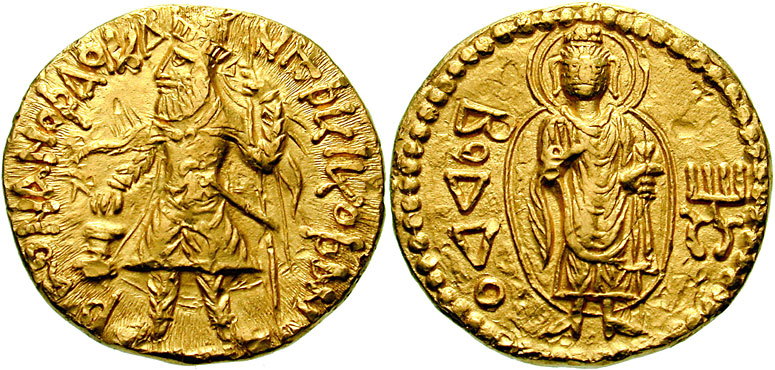
A Buddhist coin of Kanishka I, with legend ΒΟΔΔΟ "Boddo" (=the Buddha) in Greek script on the reverse.

Several other Buddhist deities may have been influenced by Greek gods. For example, Heracles with a lion-skin, the protector deity of Demetrius I of Bactria, "served as an artistic model for Vajrapani, a protector of the Buddha". In Japan, this expression further translated into the wrath-filled and muscular Niō guardian gods of the Buddha, standing today at the entrance of many Buddhist temples.

According to Katsumi Tanabe, professor at Chūō University, Japan, besides Vajrapani, Greek influence also appears in several other gods of the Mahayana pantheon such as the Japanese Fūjin, inspired from the Greek divinity Boreas through the Greco-Buddhist Wardo, or the mother deity Hariti inspired by Tyche.

In addition, forms such as garland-bearing cherubs, vine scrolls, and such semihuman creatures as the centaur and triton, are part of the repertory of Hellenistic art introduced by Greco-Roman artists in the service of the Kushan court.

== Exchanges ==
=== Proselytism in the East ===
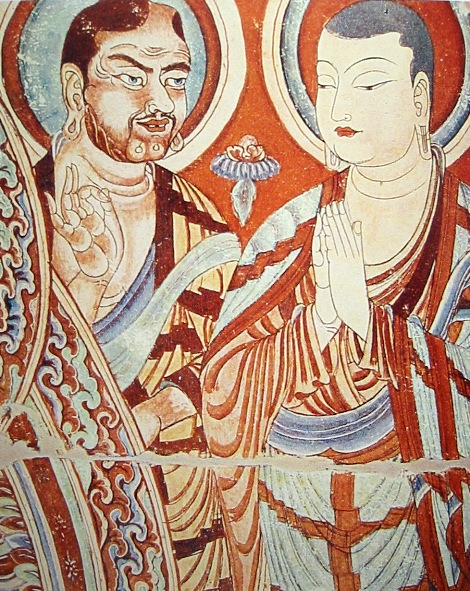
Central Asian monk teaching East-Asian monk. A fresco from the Bezeklik Thousand Buddha Caves, dated to the 9th-10th century CE (Kara-Khoja Kingdom).

Greek monks played a direct role in the upper hierarchy of Buddhism, and in its early dissemination. During the rule (165–135 BC) of the Greco-Bactrian King Menander I (Pali: "Milinda"), Mahadharmaraksita (literally translated as 'Great Teacher/Preserver of the Dharma') was "a Greek (Pali: Yona, lit. Ionian) Buddhist head monk," according to the Mahavamsa (Chap. XXIX), who led 30,000 Buddhist monks from "the Greek city of Alasandra" (Alexandria of the Caucasus, around 150 km north of today's Kabul in Afghanistan), to Sri Lanka for the dedication of the Great Stupa in Anuradhapura. Dharmaraksita (Sanskrit), or Dhammarakkhita (Pali) (translation: Protected by the Dharma), was one of the missionaries sent by the Mauryan emperor Ashoka to proselytize the Buddhist faith. He is described as being a Greek (Pali: "Yona", lit. "Ionian") in the Mahavamsa, and his activities are indicative of the strength of the Hellenistic Greek involvement during the formative centuries of Buddhism. Indeed, Menander I was famously converted to Buddhism by Nagasena, who was a student of the Greek Buddhist monk Dharmaraksita. Menander is said to have reached enlightenment as an arhat under Nagasena's guidance and is recorded as a great patron of Buddhism. The dialogue of the Greek King Menander I (Pali "Milinda") with the monk Nagasena comprises the Pali Buddhist work known as the Milinda Panha.

Buddhist monks from the region of Gandhara, where Greco-Buddhism was most influential, later played a key role in the development and the transmission of Buddhist ideas in the direction of northern Asia. Greco-Buddhist Kushan monks such as Lokaksema (c. 178 CE) travelled to the Chinese capital of Loyang, where they became the first translators of Buddhist scriptures into Chinese. Central Asian and East Asian Buddhist monks appear to have maintained strong exchanges until around the 10th century, as indicated by the Bezeklik Thousand Buddha Caves frescos from the Tarim Basin. In legend too Bodhidharma, the founder of Chán-Buddhism, which later became Zen, and the legendary originator of the physical training of the Shaolin monks that led to the creation of Shaolin Kung Fu, is described as a Buddhist monk from Central Asia in the first Chinese references to him (Yan Xuan-Zhi in 547). Throughout Buddhist art, Bodhidharma is depicted as a rather ill-tempered, profusely bearded and wide-eyed barbarian, and he is referred as "The Blue-Eyed Barbarian" (碧眼胡; Bìyǎn hú) in Chinese Chan texts. In 485 CE, according to the 7th-century Chinese historical treatise Liang Shu, five monks from Gandhara travelled to the country of Fusang ("The country of the extreme East" beyond the sea, probably eastern Japan), where they introduced Buddhism:

"Fusang is located to the east of China, 20,000 li [1,500 km] east of the state of Da Han (itself east of the state of Wa in modern Kyūshū, Japan). (...) In former times, the people of Fusang knew nothing of the Buddhist religion, but in the second year of Da Ming of the Song dynasty [AD 485], five monks from Kipin (Kabul region of Gandhara) travelled by ship to Fusang. They propagated Buddhist doctrine, circulated scriptures and drawings, and advised the people to relinquish worldly attachments. As a result the customs of Fusang changed." (Chinese: "扶桑在大漢國東二萬餘里,地在中國之東(...)其俗舊無佛法,宋大明二年,罽賓國嘗有比丘五人游行至其國,流通佛法,經像,教令出家,風 俗遂改.")

Two half-brothers from Gandhara, Asanga and Vasubandhu (4th century), created the Yogacara or "Mind-only" school of Mahayana Buddhism, which through one of its major texts, the Lankavatara Sutra, became a founding block of Mahayana, and particularly Zen, philosophy.

=== Greco-Buddhism in the West ===
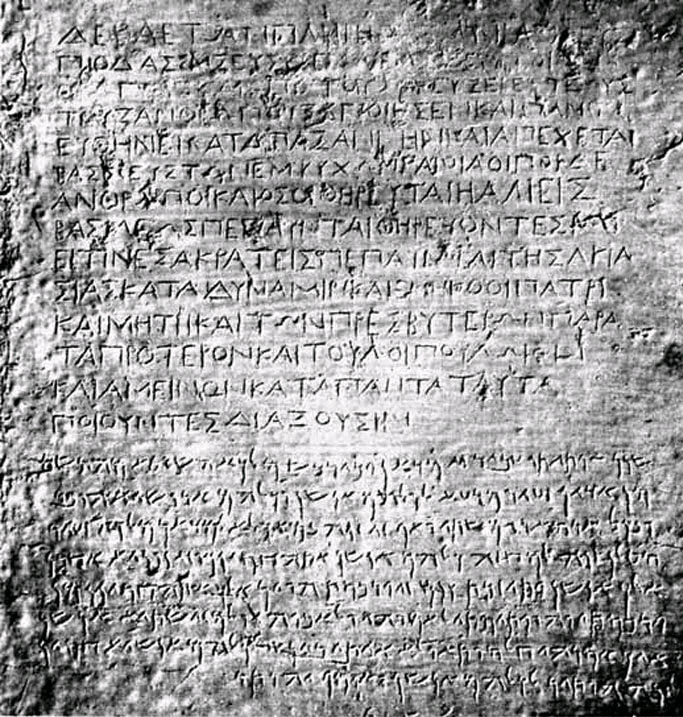
Kandahar Bilingual Rock Inscription (Greek and Aramaic) 3rd century BC by Indian Buddhist King Ashoka. This edict advocates the adoption of "godliness" using the Greek term Eusebeia for Dharma. Kabul Museum.

Intense westward physical exchange at that time along the Silk Road is confirmed by the Roman craze for silk from the 1st century BC to the point that the Senate issued, in vain, several edicts to prohibit the wearing of silk, on economic and moral grounds. This is attested by at least three authors: Strabo (64/63 BC – c. 24 AD), Seneca the Younger (c. 3 BC – 65 AD), and Pliny the Elder (23–79 AD). The aforementioned Strabo and Plutarch (c. 45–125 AD) also wrote about Indo-Greek Buddhist king Menander, confirming that information about the Indo-Greek Buddhists was circulating throughout the Hellenistic world.

Zarmanochegas (Zarmarus) (Ζαρμανοχηγὰς) was a monk of the Sramana tradition (possibly, but not necessarily a Buddhist) who, according to ancient historians such as Strabo and Dio Cassius, met Nicholas of Damascus in Antioch while Augustus (d. 14 AD) was ruling the Roman Empire, and shortly thereafter proceeded to Athens where he burnt himself to death. His story and tomb in Athens were well-known over a century later. Plutarch (d. 120 AD) in his Life of Alexander, after discussing the self-immolation of Calanus of India (Kalanos) witnessed by Alexander writes: "The same thing was done long after by another Indian who came with Caesar to Athens, where they still show you 'the Indian's Monument,'" referring to Zarmanochegas' tomb in Roman Athens.

Another century later, the Christian church father Clement of Alexandria (d. 215 AD) mentioned the Buddha by his title in his Stromata (Bk I, Ch XV): "The Indian gymnosophists are also in the number, and the other barbarian philosophers. And of these there are two classes, some of them called Sarmanæ and others Brahmins. And those of the Sarmanæ who are called "Hylobii" neither inhabit cities, nor have roofs over them, but are clothed in the bark of trees, feed on nuts, and drink water in their hands. Like those called Encratites in the present day, they know not marriage nor begetting of children. Some, too, of the Indians obey the precepts of Buddha (Βούττα) whom, on account of his extraordinary sanctity, they have raised to divine honours."

Indian gravestones from the Ptolemaic period have been found in Alexandria in Egypt. The presence of Buddhists in Alexandria at this time is important, since "It was later in this very place that some of the most active centers of Christianity were established".

The pre-Christian monastic order of the Therapeutae is possibly a deformation of the Pāli word "Theravāda", a form of Buddhism; the movement may have also "almost entirely drawn (its) inspiration from the teaching and practices of Buddhist asceticism". They may even have been descendants of Asoka's emissaries to the West. While Philo of Alexandria's description of the doctrines and practices of the Therapeutae leaves great ambiguity about what religion they are associated with, analysis by religious scholar Ullrich R. Kleinhempel indicates that the most likely religion the Therapeutae practiced was Buddhism.

In 2022, American-Polish archeologists unearthed an Egyptian temple dedicated to the goddess Isis and god Serapis, containing a Buddha sculpture and Hindu gods; this find indicates Greco-Buddhist influence extending to the early Roman period.

=== Buddhism and Christianity ===
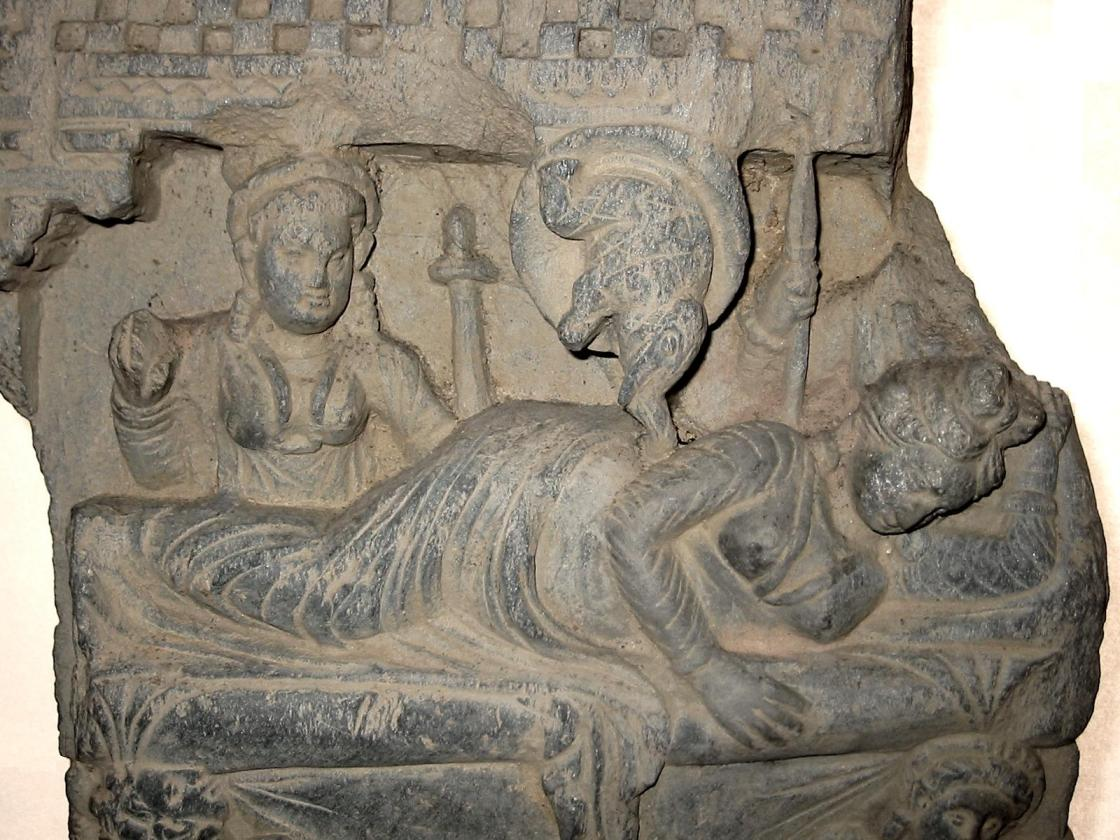
Queen Māyā's white elephant dream, and the conception of the Buddha. Gandhara, 2nd–3rd century AD.

Although the religions of Buddhism and Christianity have evolved in rather different ways, the moral precepts advocated by Buddhism from the time of Ashoka through his edicts do have some similarities with the Christian moral precepts developed more than two centuries later. Similarities of the two religions include respect for life, respect for the weak, rejection of violence, pardon to sinners, and tolerance.

One theory is that these similarities may indicate the propagation of Buddhist ideals into the Western World, with the Greeks acting as intermediaries and religious syncretists.

Scholars have often considered the possibility that Buddhism influenced the early development of Christianity. They have drawn attention to many parallels concerning the births, lives, doctrines, and deaths of the Buddha and Jesus.

— Bentley, Old World Encounters

Saint Jerome (4th century AD) mentions the birth of the Buddha, who he says "was born from the side of a virgin," and the influential early Christian church father Clement of Alexandria (d. 215) mentioned Buddha (Βούττα) in his Stromata (Bk I, Ch XV). The legend of Christian saints Barlaam and Josaphat draws on the life of the Buddha.

== Reception ==
The idea of a Greek influence on the development of Buddhism has been particularly advocated by Étienne Lamotte and Thomas McEvilley, who has speculated that "like the Gandharan art style, the Gandharan Buddhist style must have had a prominent Hellenic factor", although he does not employ the term "Greco-Buddhism" for this. McEvilley's theory has been met by skepticism by other scholars.

While the Hellenistic influences in Gandharan Buddhist art have been widely accepted it remains a matter of controversy among art historians whether the non-Indian characteristics of Gandhāran sculpture reflect a continuous Greek tradition rooted in Alexander's conquests in Bactria, subsequent contacts with later traditions of the Hellenistic east, direct communication with contemporary artists from the Roman empire, or some complex conjunction of such sources. Examples include statues of bodhisattvas adorned with royal jewellery (bracelets and torques) and amulet boxes, the contrapposto stance, an emphasis on draperies, and a plethora of Dionysian themes.

Beyond the artistic realm, however, most scholars do not assume a noticeable Greek influence on Gandharan Buddhism. Some have identified a need for further research in this regard. Olga Kubica has criticised the term "Greco-Buddhism" as "inadequate" since a "reconciliation or union of differing systems of belief" did not occur here. She states that she does "not exclude the possibility that some phenomena within Buddhism may be interpreted as a manifestation of syncretism between Greek and Buddhist elements, but the term Greco-Buddhism applies only to certain aspects and not to the entirety of Greco-Buddhist relations".

The term "Greco-Buddhist art" has also been criticised among art historians. According to Peter Stewart, it is "deeply deceptive in several ways and should be avoided". Johanna Hanink has attributed the concept of "Greco-Buddhist art" to a European scholarly inability to accept that natives could have developed "the pleasing proportions and elegant poses of sculptures from ancient Gandhara", citing Michael Falser and arguing that the entire notion of "Buddhist art with a Greek 'essence'" is a colonial imposition that originated during British rule in India.

== See also ==
- Gandharan Buddhism
- Gandhāran Buddhist texts
- Greco-Bactrian Kingdom
- Greco-Buddhist Art
- Greco-Buddhist monasticism
- Indo-Greek Kingdom
- Manicheanism
- Milinda Pañha
- Nāgasena
- Religions of the Indo-Greeks
- Silk road transmission of Buddhism
- Buddhism in Central Asia
- Buddhas of Bamyan
- Western Buddhism
- Berenike Buddha
- Kushan Empire
- Ancient Greece–Ancient India relations
- Index of Buddhism-related articles

== Bibliography ==
- Vassiliades, Demetrios Th. 2016. Greeks and Buddhism. Athens, Indo-Hellenic Society for Culture & Development ELINEPA.
- Alexander the Great: East-West Cultural Contacts from Greece to Japan. Tokyo: NHK Puromōshon and Tokyo National Museum, 2003.
- Baums, Stefan. 2012. "Catalog and Revised Texts and Translations of Gandharan Reliquary Inscriptions." In: David Jongeward, Elizabeth Errington, Richard Salomon and Stefan Baums, Gandharan Buddhist Reliquaries, p. 204, Seattle: Early Buddhist Manuscripts Project (Gandharan Studies, Volume 1).
- Baums, Stefan, and Andrew Glass. 2002– . Catalog of Gāndhārī Texts, no. CKI 32
- Jerry H. Bentley. Old World Encounters: Cross-cultural Contacts and Exchanges in Pre-modern Times. Oxford–NY: Oxford University Press, 1993. ISBN 0-19-507639-7
- John Boardman. The Diffusion of Classical Art in Antiquity. Princeton, NJ: Princeton University Press, 1994. ISBN 0-691-03680-2
- Shravasti Dhammika, trans. The Edicts of King Asoka: An English Rendering. Kandy, Sri Lanka: Buddhist Publication Society, 1993. ISBN 955-24-0104-6
- Richard Foltz. Religions of the Silk Road, 2nd edition, New York: Palgrave Macmillan, 2010 ISBN 978-0-230-62125-1
- Georgios T. Halkias, "When the Greeks Converted the Buddha: Asymmetrical Transfers of Knowledge in Indo-Greek Cultures", in Trade and Religions: Religious Formation, Transformation and Cross-Cultural Exchange between East and West, ed. Volker Rabens. Leiden: Brill, 2013, p. 65–115.
- Kubica, Olga (2023). Greco-Buddhist relations in the Hellenistic Far East : sources and contexts. New York: Routledge. ISBN 9781003258575.
- Robert Linssen. Living Zen. NY: Grove Press, 1958. ISBN 0-8021-3136-0
- Lowenstein, Tom (1996). The vision of the Buddha. Duncan Baird Publishers. ISBN 1-903296-91-9.
- Thomas McEvilley. The Shape of Ancient Thought: Comparative Studies in Greek and Indian Philosophies. NY: Allworth Press and the School of Visual Arts, 2002. ISBN 1-58115-203-5
- William Woodthorpe Tarn. The Greeks in Bactria and India. Cambridge: Cambridge University Press, 1951, ISBN 81-215-0220-9
- Marian Wenzel. Echoes of Alexander the Great: Silk Route Portraits from Gandhara, foreword by the Dalai Lama. Eklisa Anstalt, 2000. ISBN 1-58886-014-0
- Paul Williams. Mahāyāna Buddhism: the Doctrinal Foundations. London–NY: Routledge, 1989. ISBN 0-415-02537-0
