= Peucolaus =

Peucolaus Soter Dicaeus
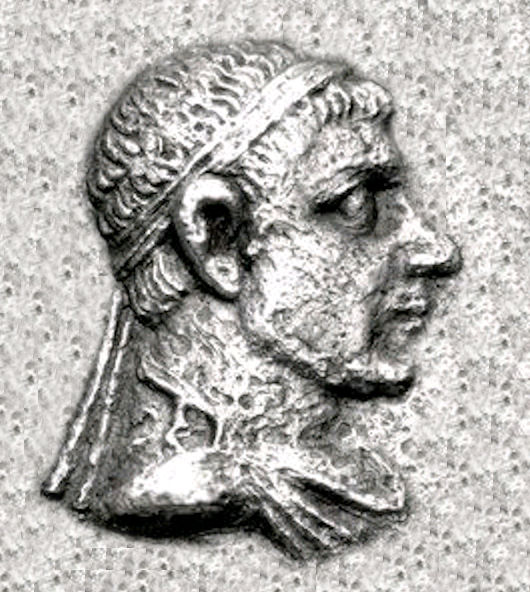
- Portrait of Peucolaus

Indo-Greek king
- Reign: c. 90 BC

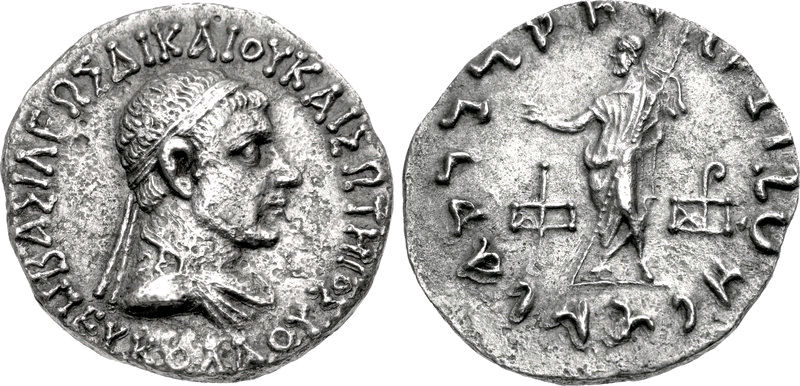
Peucolaos Tetradrachm. Obv Diademed king, legend ΒΑΣΙΛΕΩΣ ΔΙΚΑΙΟΥ KAI ΣΩΤΗΡΟΣ/ ΠΕΥΚΟΛΑΟΥ "King Peucolaus, the Just and the Saviour". Rev. Maharajasa dhramikasa tratarasa/ Piükulaäsa ""King Peucolaus, follower of the Dharma and Saviour". Zeus making a blessing gesture.

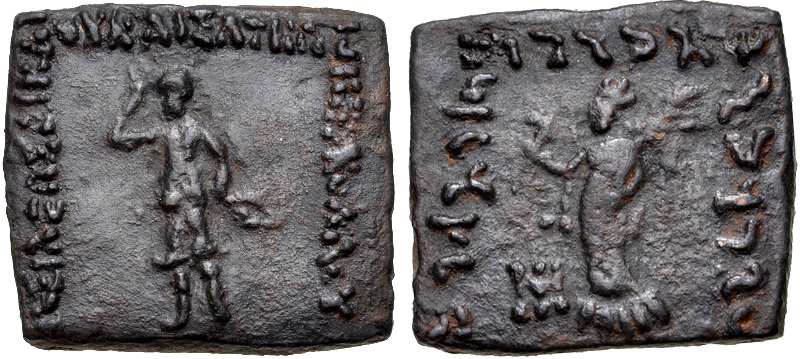
Coin of Peucolaus. Obverse: Artemis standing facing, drawing arrow from quiver. Reverse: Goddess standing left, holding a flower and palm. Similar to the goddess of Pushkalavati on a coin of that city.

Peucolaus Soter Dicaeus (Ancient Greek: Πευκόλαος Σωτήρ Δίκαιος, romanized: Peukolaos Sōtēr Dikaios; epithets mean respectively, "the Saviour", "the Just") was an Indo-Greek king who ruled in the area of Gandhara c. 90 BC. His reign was probably short and insignificant, since he left only a few coins, but the relations of the latter Indo-Greek kings remain largely obscure.

His name is probably derived from that of Pushkalavati, known in ancient Greek as Peukelaôtis, which was the historic capital of Gandhara.

== Coinage ==
Peucolaus struck rare Indian standard silver coins with portrait in diadem, and a reverse of a standing Zeus, which resemble the reverse of contemporary kings Heliokles II and Archebios. The latter has overstruck two coins of Peucolaos.

He also issued bilingual bronzes with Artemis and a crowned woman with a palm branch, perhaps a city-goddess or a personification of Tyche, the deity for good luck.

== See also ==
- Greco-Bactrian Kingdom
- Greco-Buddhism
- Indo-Scythians
- Indo-Parthian Kingdom
- Kushan Empire

== Bibliography ==
- The Greeks in Bactria and India, W. W. Tarn, Cambridge University Press.
- The Coin Types of the Indo-Greek Kings, 256-54 B.C., A. K. Narain
- Le Roi Peukolaos

Preceded by Amyntas Nikator	Indo-Greek Ruler (in Arachosia, Gandhara) c. 90 BC	Succeeded by Menander II

	Greco-Bactrian kings		Indo-Greek kings					
Territories/ dates	West Bactria	East Bactria	Paropamisade	Arachosia	Gandhara	Western Punjab	Eastern Punjab	Mathura
326-325 BCE	Campaigns of Alexander the Great in India						Nanda Empire	
312 BCE	Creation of the Seleucid Empire						Creation of the Maurya Empire	
305 BCE	Seleucid Empire after Mauryan war		Maurya Empire					
280 BCE	Foundation of Ai-Khanoum							
255–239 BCE	Independence of the Greco-Bactrian kingdom Diodotus I		Emperor Ashoka (268-232 BCE)					
239–223 BCE	Diodotus II							
230–200 BCE	Euthydemus I							
200–190 BCE	Demetrius I				Sunga Empire			
190-185 BCE	Euthydemus II							
190–180 BCE	Agathocles			Pantaleon				
185–170 BCE	Antimachus I							
180–160 BCE			Apollodotus I					
175–170 BCE	Demetrius II							
160–155 BCE			Antimachus II					
170–145 BCE	Eucratides I							
155–130 BCE	Yuezhi occupation, loss of Ai-Khanoum	Eucratides II; Plato; Heliocles I	Menander I					
130–120 BCE	Yuezhi occupation		Zoilus I		Agathoclea			Yavanarajya inscription
120–110 BCE			Lysias		Strato I			Yavanarajya inscription
110–100 BCE			Antialcidas		Heliocles II			Yavanarajya inscription
100 BCE			Polyxenus		Demetrius III			Yavanarajya inscription
100–95 BCE			Philoxenus					Yavanarajya inscription
95–90 BCE			Diomedes	Amyntas		Epander		Yavanarajya inscription
90 BCE			Theophilus	Peucolaus		Thraso		Yavanarajya inscription
90–85 BCE			Nicias	Menander II		Artemidorus		Yavanarajya inscription
90–70 BCE			Hermaeus	Archebius				Yavanarajya inscription
			Yuezhi occupation		Maues (Indo-Scythian)			
75–70 BCE				Vonones	Telephus	Apollodotus II		
65–55 BCE				Spalirises		Hippostratus	Dionysius	
55–35 BCE					Azes I (Indo-Scythians)		Zoilus II	
55–35 BCE					Vijayamitra/ Azilises		Apollophanes	
25 BCE – 10 CE				Gondophares	Zeionises	Kharahostes	Strato II; Strato III	
				Gondophares (Indo-Parthian)			Rajuvula (Indo-Scythian)	
			Kujula Kadphises (Kushan Empire)				Bhadayasa (Indo-Scythian)	Sodasa (Indo-Scythian)
