= Menander II =

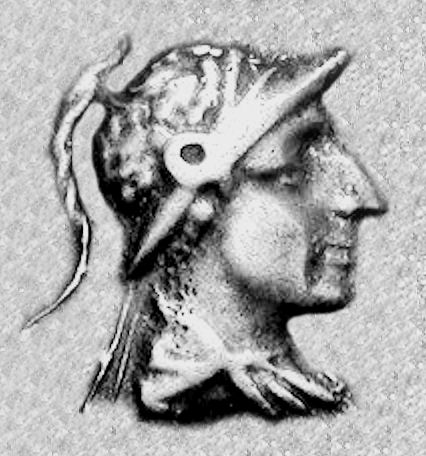
- Portrait of Menander II.

Indo-Greek king
- Reign: 90–85 BC
- Born: Sagala
- Father: Strato I ?
- Religion: Greek Polytheism; Greco-Buddhism

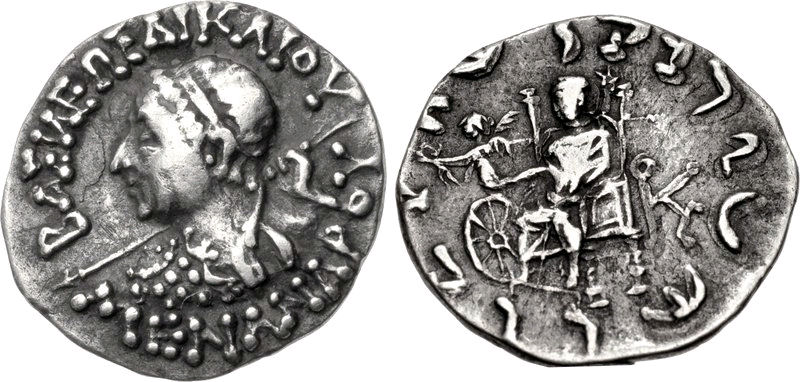
Silver Drachm of Menander II. The obverse with the diademed king, wearing aegis, and brandishing a spear. The Greek legend reads: ΒΑΣΙΛΕΩΣ ΔΙΚΑΙΟΥ ΜΕΝΑΝΔΡΟΥ, Basileōs Dikaiou Menandrou, "Of King Menander the Just". The reverse shows Zeus Nikephoros, and the eight-spoked wheel of Dharma. The Kharoshthi legend reads: Maharajasa Dharmikasa Menadrasa, "Of King Menander, the Follower of the Dharma".

Menander II Dikaios (Greek: Μένανδρος Β΄ ὁ Δίκαιος, Ménandros ho Díkaios, meaning "Menander the Just") may have been an Indo-Greek King who ruled in the areas of Arachosia and Gandhara in the north of modern Pakistan. However, since he is entirely known through his coins, this may have just been a separate set of coins issued by Menander I with a different epithet.

== Time of reign ==
Bopearachchi has suggested that Menander II reigned c. 90–85 BC, where as R. C. Senior has suggested c. 65 BC. In that case, Menander II ruled remaining Indo-Greek territories in Gandhara after the invasion and establishment of the Indo-Scythian king maues, who initiated a major shift in politicial power in the region.

== Relations to other kings ==
Menander II may have belonged to the dynasty of Menander I Soter, the greatest of the Indo-Greek kings. It was long believed that there was only one king named Menander (see discussion under Menander I) as their portraits were rather similar and Menander II seems to have been a devout Buddhist, just as Menander I was, according to the ancient Buddhist scripture the Milindapanha.

On the other hand, the name Menander could well have been popular in the Indo-Greek kingdom, and the coins of Menander II are not very like those of Menander I nor of those other kings (such as Strato I) who are believed to have belonged to his dynasty. R. C. Senior links Menander II with the Indo-Greek king Amyntas, with whom he shares several monograms and also facial features such as a pointed nose and receding chin. He also suggests a close relation to the semi-Scythian king Artemidorus, son of Maues, since their coins use similar types and are often found together.

There is a small possibility that Menander II, rather than Menander I, is actually the Buddhist Greek king referred to in the Milinda Panha. This point is unsolved however, since Greek sources (Plutarch (Praec. reip. ger. 28, 6)) relate that the great conqueror Menander I is the one who received the honour of burial in what could be interpreted as Buddhist stupas.

More likely, Menander I may indeed have first supported Buddhism, like the other Indo-Greek kings, and was probably the protagonist of the Milindapanha, on account of his described fame, whereas Menander II, a minor king, may have wholeheartedly embraced Buddhism, as exemplified by his coins.

== Coins of Menander II ==
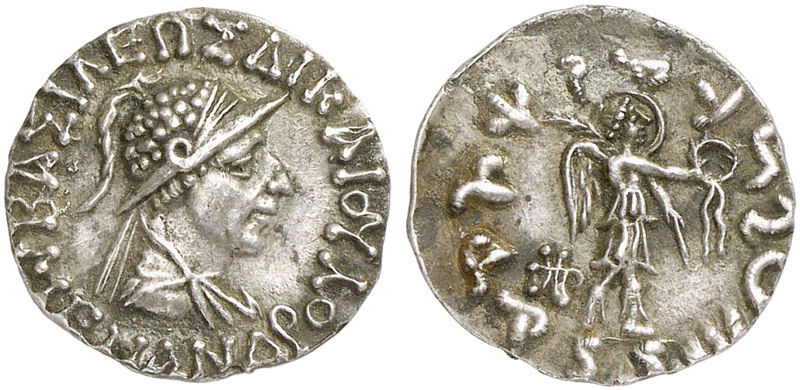
Coin of Menander II. The obverse shows the King wearing a decorated helmet and diadem, with the Greek legend: ΒΑΣΙΛΕΩΣ ΔΙΚΑΙΟΥ ΜΕΝΑΝΔΡΟΥ, Basileōs Dikaiou Menandrou, "Of King Menander the Just". The reverse shows the winged goddess Nike holding a wreath. The Kharoshthi legend reads Maharajasa Dharmikasa Menadrasa, "Of King Menander, the Follower of the Dharma".

The coins of Menander II bear the mention "Menander the Just", and "King of the Dharma" in Kharoshti, suggesting that he adopted the Buddhist faith. Menander II struck only Indian silver. These depict the king in diadem or helmet of the type of Menander I, with a number of reverses: a king on horseback, Nike and a sitting Zeus of the type of Antialkidas and Amyntas Nikator, but with an eight-spoked Buddhist wheel instead of the small elephant.

His bronzes feature Athena standing, with spear and palm-branch, shield at her feet, making a benediction gesture with the right hand, similar to the Buddhist vitarka mudra. Other varieties feature a king performing the same gesture.

On the reverse is a lion, symbol of Buddhism, as also seen on the pillars of the Mauryan King Ashoka. In general, the coins of Menander II are quite few, which tends to indicate a rather small rule.

A contemporary king to represent the Buddhist lion on his coins is the Indo-Scythian king Maues, around 85 BC.

== Gallery ==
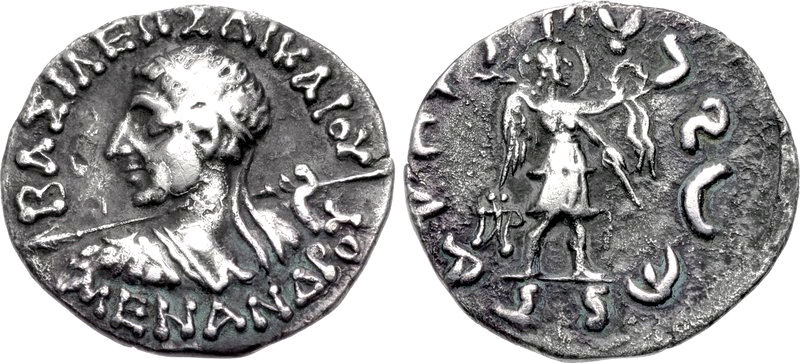
Menander II as a spearholder.

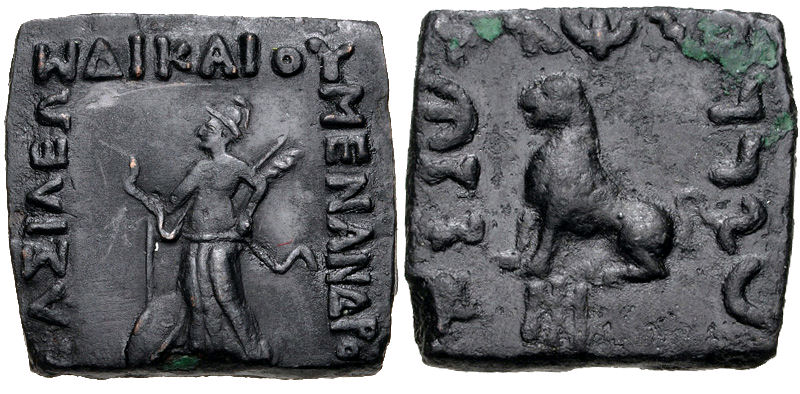
Indian square coin of Menander II.

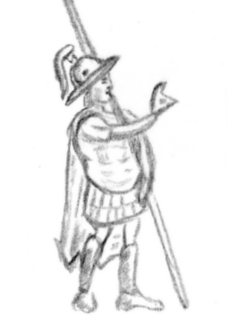
Menander II equipped with a cuirass, lamellar armour for the thighs, and greaves, and making a blessing gesture. This is the obverse figure of an Indian-standard square coin of Menander II, with walking lion on the reverse.

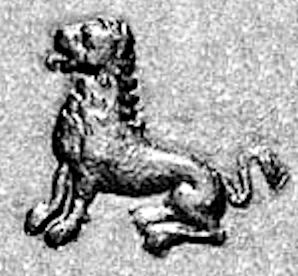
The lion on Menander II's coins is similar to those on the Pillars of Ashoka: seated posture, protruding tongue, mane (detail of Indian-standard square coin of Menander II).

	Greco-Bactrian kings		Indo-Greek kings					
Territories/ dates	West Bactria	East Bactria	Paropamisade	Arachosia	Gandhara	Western Punjab	Eastern Punjab	Mathura
326-325 BCE	Campaigns of Alexander the Great in India						Nanda Empire	
312 BCE	Creation of the Seleucid Empire						Creation of the Maurya Empire	
305 BCE	Seleucid Empire after Mauryan war		Maurya Empire					
280 BCE	Foundation of Ai-Khanoum							
255–239 BCE	Independence of the Greco-Bactrian kingdom Diodotus I		Emperor Ashoka (268-232 BCE)					
239–223 BCE	Diodotus II							
230–200 BCE	Euthydemus I							
200–190 BCE	Demetrius I				Sunga Empire			
190-185 BCE	Euthydemus II							
190–180 BCE	Agathocles			Pantaleon				
185–170 BCE	Antimachus I							
180–160 BCE			Apollodotus I					
175–170 BCE	Demetrius II							
160–155 BCE			Antimachus II					
170–145 BCE	Eucratides I							
155–130 BCE	Yuezhi occupation, loss of Ai-Khanoum	Eucratides II; Plato; Heliocles I	Menander I					
130–120 BCE	Yuezhi occupation		Zoilus I		Agathoclea			Yavanarajya inscription
120–110 BCE			Lysias		Strato I			Yavanarajya inscription
110–100 BCE			Antialcidas		Heliocles II			Yavanarajya inscription
100 BCE			Polyxenus		Demetrius III			Yavanarajya inscription
100–95 BCE			Philoxenus					Yavanarajya inscription
95–90 BCE			Diomedes	Amyntas		Epander		Yavanarajya inscription
90 BCE			Theophilus	Peucolaus		Thraso		Yavanarajya inscription
90–85 BCE			Nicias	Menander II		Artemidorus		Yavanarajya inscription
90–70 BCE			Hermaeus	Archebius				Yavanarajya inscription
			Yuezhi occupation		Maues (Indo-Scythian)			
75–70 BCE				Vonones	Telephus	Apollodotus II		
65–55 BCE				Spalirises		Hippostratus	Dionysius	
55–35 BCE					Azes I (Indo-Scythians)		Zoilus II	
55–35 BCE					Vijayamitra/ Azilises		Apollophanes	
25 BCE – 10 CE				Gondophares	Zeionises	Kharahostes	Strato II; Strato III	
				Gondophares (Indo-Parthian)			Rajuvula (Indo-Scythian)	
			Kujula Kadphises (Kushan Empire)				Bhadayasa (Indo-Scythian)	Sodasa (Indo-Scythian)

Preceded by Peukolaos	Indo-Greek ruler in Arachosia and Gandhara; 90–85 BC	Succeeded by Archebios
