= Maues =

Indo-Scythian king

Maues Μαύης
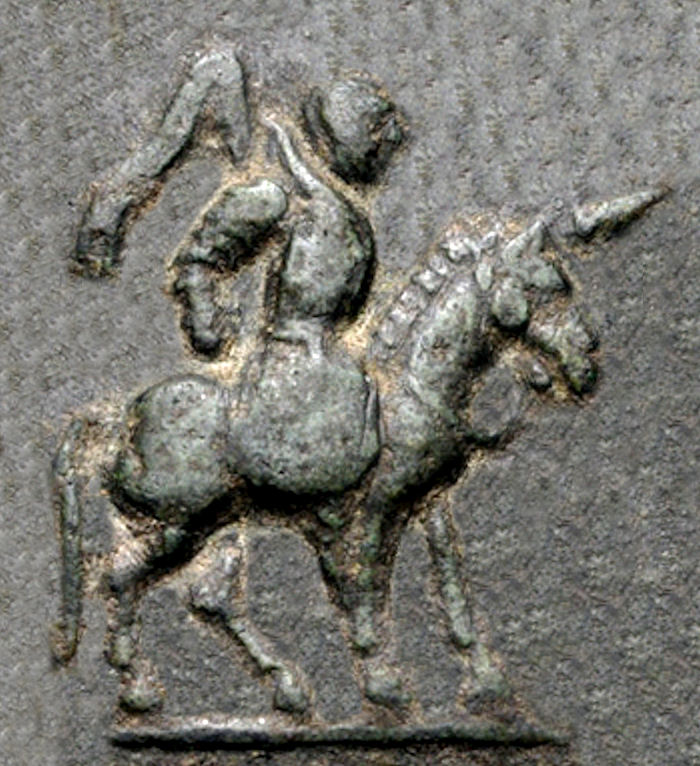
- Maues riding in armour. Like many other Indo-Scythians, Maues did not issue portraits.

Indo-Scythian king
- Reign: 98/85 – 60/57 BCE
- Spouse: Machene
- Religion: Greek Hinduism

Maues (Greek: Μαύης Maúēs; ΜΑΥΟΥ Mauou (epigraphic); Kharosthi: 𐨨𐨆𐨀 Mo-a, Moa, called 𐨨𐨆𐨒 Mo-ga, Moga on the Taxila copper plate; also called 𐨨𐨅𐨬𐨐𐨁 𐨨𐨁𐨩𐨁𐨐 Me-va-ki Mi-yi-ka, Mevaki Miyika in the Mathura lion capital inscription,) was the first Indo-Scythian king, ruling from 98/85 to 60/57 BCE. He invaded India and established Saka hegemony by conquering Indo-Greek territories.

== Name ==
Maues's name primarily attested from his coins appear under the Gandhari form Moa (𐨨𐨆𐨀) and the Ancient Greek form Maúēs (Μαύης), both of which are variants of the same Scythian Saka language name *Mava, meaning "tiger" and "hero".

Another form of Maues's name appears on the Taxila copper plate as Moga (𐨨𐨆𐨒), which is a Gandhari derivation of the Saka name *Mauka, which also means "tiger" and "hero".

The Mathura lion capital inscription refers to Maues as Mevaki Miyika (𐨨𐨅𐨬𐨐𐨁 𐨨𐨁𐨩𐨁𐨐), which is composed of Mevaki, derived from Saka *Mavyaka, meaning "tiger", and of Miyika, from Saka *mayaka, meaning "prosperous".

== Sakas ==
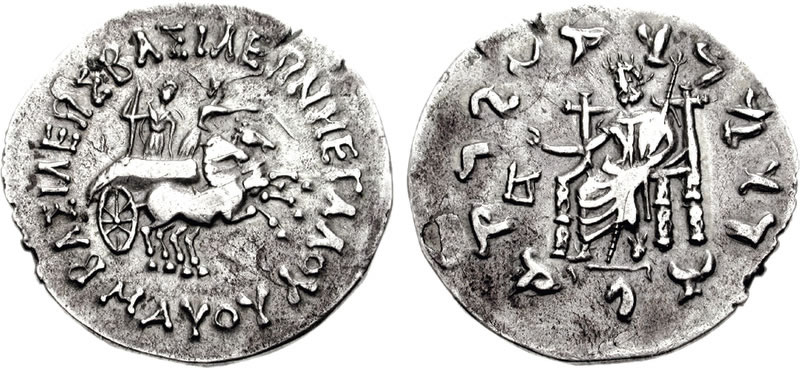
Silver tetradrachm of Maues. The obverse shows Zeus standing with a sceptre. The Greek legend reads ΒΑΣΙΛΕΩΣ ΒΑΣΙΛΕΩΝ ΜΕΓΑΛΟΥ ΜΑΥΟΥ (Οf the Great King of Kings Maues). The reverse shows Nike standing, holding a wreath. Kharoshthi legend. Taxila mint.

The Sakas, and/or the related Parni (who founded the Parthian Empire) and Scythians, were nomadic Eastern Iranian peoples.

The Sakas from Sakastan defeated and killed the Parthian king Phraates II in 126 B.C. Indo-Scythians established themselves in the Indus around 88 B.C., during the end of Mithridates II of Parthias reign. The Sakas and Pahlavas became closely associated during the Saka migration. This can be demonstrated from various sources, such as the adoption of names and titles. Maues took the title of "Great King of Kings", an exceeded version of a traditional Persian royal title.

=== Ethnic origin ===
Some scholars have suggested that Maues may have been of Kamboja lineage. Sten Konow, in his edition of the Corpus Inscriptionum Indicarum (1929), interpreted the name Kamuia (found in the Mathura lion capital inscriptions) as a Prakrit rendering of the Sanskrit Kambojika (“from the Kamboja lineage”). According to this view, figures such as Maues (Moga), Arta, and their relatives mentioned in the inscriptions may have belonged to the Kamboja clan rather than being of purely Scythian origin. Other scholars have theorised that he could be an Iranian from the east (Parthian, Sistani Persian or Saka) and that he imitated the tittle of the Shahanshah of Persia.

== Maues Campaigns ==
Maues is the first recorded ruler of the Sakas in the Indus. He is first mentioned in the Moga inscription:

"In the seventy eighth, 78, year the Great King, the Great Moga, on the fifth, 5, day of the month Panemos, on this first, of the Kshaharata and Kshatrapa of Chukhsa - Liaka Kusuluka by name - his son Patika - in the town of Takshasila..."

Mauses is possibly mentioned the Maira inscription in the Salt Range in Pakistan as 'Moasa'.

Maues vastly expanded his domain by conquering key cities along the Indus. This included seizing Taxila in Punjab, and Gandharas capital city Pushkalavati from the Indo-Greek Kingdoms. Maues has overstruck coins belonging to Archebius as well as Apollodotus II in Taxila.

The Sakas extend their power up to Mathura during his reign.

=== Route of the Invasions ===
When precisely and under what circumstances Maues arrived in India is uncertain, but the expulsion of the Scythian (Saka/Sai) peoples from Central Asia is referred to in the Han Shu, where the cause given is their confrontation with the Ta Yüeh-chih, themselves undergoing an enforced migration. It is stated that "when the Ta Yüeh-chih turned west, defeated and expelled the king of the Sai, the latter moved south and crossed over the Suspended Crossing." That this route (from the Pamirs into the Gilgit valley) was used in Maues' time is confirmed by the discovery of inscriptions in the Chilas/Gilgit area bearing his name (Dani, 1983 and 1995, pp. 52, 55).

== Coins ==
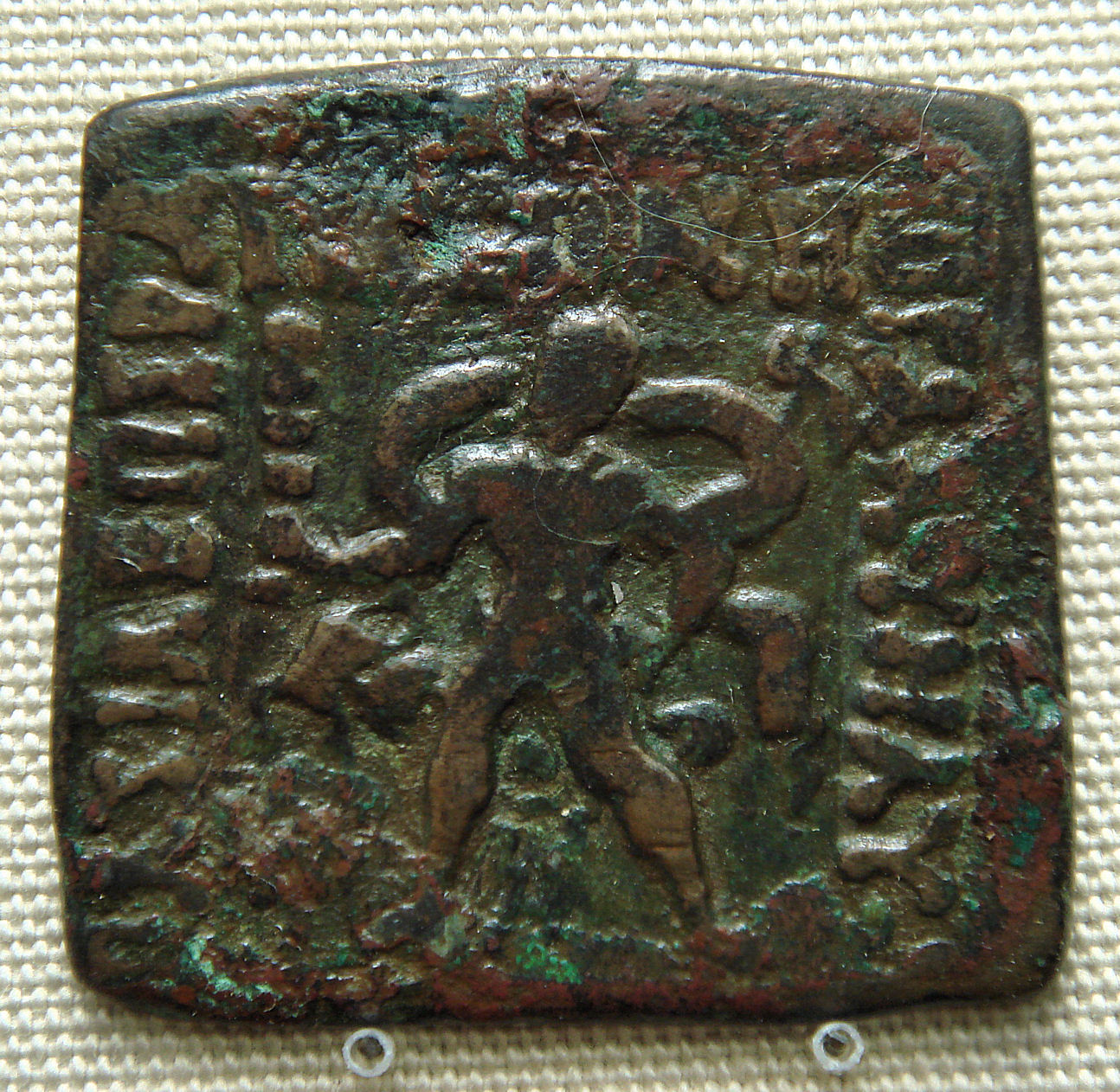
Coin of Maues depicting Balarama, 1st century BCE. British Museum.

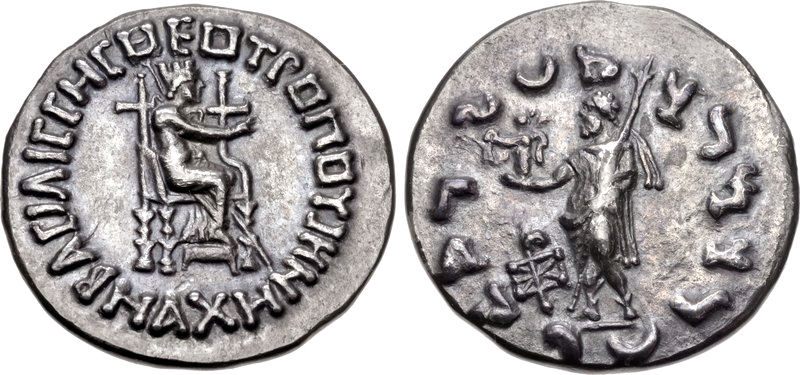
Coin of Machene, Queen of Maues. Obv. Tyche, wearing mural crown. Legend ΒΑΣΙΛΙΣΣΗΣ ΘEOTPOΠOY MAXHNHΣ "Godlike Queen Machene". Rev. Zeus with Nike, legend "Rajatirajasa mahatasa Moasa" in Kharoshthi "Great king of kings, Maues".

Maues issued joint coins mentioning a queen Machene ("ΜΑΧΗΝΗ"). Machene may have been a daughter of one of the Indo-Greek houses.

An Indo-Greek king, Artemidoros, also issued coins where he describes himself as "Son of Maues".

=== Buddhist Coins ===
A few of the coins of Maues, struck according to the Indian square standard, seemingly depict a King in a cross-legged seated position. This may represent Maues himself, or possibly one of his divinities. It has been suggested that this might also be one of the first representations of the Buddha on a coin, in an area where Buddhism was flourishing at the time, but the seated personage seems to hold a sword horizontally, which favors the hypotheses of the depiction of the king Maues himself.

Also, Maues struck some coins incorporating Buddhist symbolism, such as the lion, symbol of Buddhism since the time of the Mauryan king Ashoka.

The symbolism of the lion had also been adopted by the Buddhist Indo-Greek king Menander II. Maues therefore probably supported Buddhism, although whether sincerely or for political motives is unclear. His coins also included a variety of other religious symbols such as the bull of Shiva, indicating wide religious tolerance.

== Sources ==
- Gazerani, Saghi (2015). The Sistani Cycle of Epics and Iran's National History: On the Margins of Historiography. BRILL. pp. 1–250. ISBN 9789004282964.
- Olbrycht, Marek Jan (2016). "Dynastic Connections in the Arsacid Empire and the Origins of the House of Sāsān". In Curtis, Vesta Sarkhosh; Pendleton, Elizabeth J.; Alram, Michael; Daryaee, Touraj (eds.). The Parthian and Early Sasanian Empires: Adaptation and Expansion. Oxbow Books. ISBN 9781785702082.
- Rezakhani, Khodadad (2017). "East Iran in Late Antiquity". ReOrienting the Sasanians: East Iran in Late Antiquity. Edinburgh University Press. pp. 1–256. ISBN 9781474400305. JSTOR 10.3366/j.ctt1g04zr8. (registration required)
- Harmatta, János (1999). "Languages and scripts in Graeco-Bactria and the Saka Kingdoms". In Harmatta, János; Puri, B. N.; Etemadi, G. F. (eds.). History of civilizations of Central Asia. Vol. 2. Delhi: Motilal Banarsidass Publishing House. ISBN 978-8-120-81408-0.
- Konow, Sten (1929). Kharoshṭhī Inscriptions: with the Exception of Those of Aśoka. Kolkata: Government of India Central Publication Branch.

Preceded by (In Arachosia, Gandhara and Punjab); Indo-Greek King; Archebios (In Paropamisade); Indo-Greek King; Hermaeus	Indo-Scythian Ruler (85–60 BCE)	Succeeded by (In Gandhara); Indo-Greek king: Artemidoros (In Punjab); Indo-Greek king: Apollodotus II (In the south); Indo-Scythian ruler: Vonones

Territories/ dates	Western India	Western Pakistan Balochistan	Paropamisadae Arachosia	Bajaur	Gandhara	Western Punjab	Eastern Punjab	Mathura
			INDO-GREEK KINGDOM					
90–85 BCE			Nicias	Menander II		Artemidoros		
90–70 BCE			Hermaeus	Archebius				
85-60 BCE			INDO-SCYTHIAN KINGDOM; Maues					
75–70 BCE			Vonones; Spalahores	Telephos		Apollodotus II		
65–55 BCE			Spalirises; Spalagadames			Hippostratos	Dionysios	
55–35 BCE			Azes I				Zoilos II	
55–35 BCE			Azilises; Azes II				Apollophanes	Indo-Scythian dynasty of the NORTHERN SATRAPS; Hagamasha
25 BCE – 10 CE				Indo-Scythian dynasty of the APRACHARAJAS; Vijayamitra (ruled 12 BCE - 15 CE) (Note: From the dated inscription on the Rukhana reliquary)	Liaka Kusulaka; Patika Kusulaka; Zeionises	Kharahostes (ruled 10 BCE– 10 CE) (Note: An Inscribed Silver Buddhist Reliquary of the Time of King Kharaosta and Prince Indravarman, Richard Salomon, Journal of the American Oriental Society, Vol. 116, No. 3 (Jul. - Sep., 1996), pp. 442); Mujatria	Strato II and Strato III	Hagana
10-20 CE		INDO-PARTHIAN KINGDOM; Gondophares		Indravasu	INDO-PARTHIAN KINGDOM; Gondophares		Rajuvula	
20-30 CE			Ubouzanes; Pakores	Vispavarma (ruled c.0-20 CE) (Note: A Kharosthī Reliquary Inscription of the Time of the Apraca Prince Visnuvarma, by Richard Salomon, South Asian Studies 11 1995, Pages 27-32, Published online: 09 Aug 2010)	Sarpedones		Bhadayasa	Sodasa
30-40 CE			KUSHAN EMPIRE; Kujula Kadphises	Indravarma	Abdagases		...	...
40-45 CE				Aspavarma	Gadana		...	...
45-50 CE				Sasan	Sases		...	...
50-75 CE							...	...
75-100 CE	Indo-Scythian dynasty of the WESTERN SATRAPS; Chastana		Vima Takto				...	...
100-120 CE	Abhiraka		Vima Kadphises				...	...
120 CE	Bhumaka; Nahapana	PARATARAJAS; Yolamira	Kanishka I				Great Satrap Kharapallana and Satrap Vanaspara for Kanishka I	
130-230 CE	Jayadaman; Rudradaman I Damajadasri I Jivadaman; Rudrasimha I Satyadaman; Jivadaman; Rudrasena I	Bagamira; Arjuna; Hvaramira; Mirahvara	Vāsishka (c. 140 – c. 160); Huvishka (c. 160 – c. 190); Vasudeva I (c. 190 – to at least 230)					
230-280 CE	Samghadaman; Damasena; Damajadasri II; Viradaman; Isvaradatta; Yasodaman I Vijayasena; Damajadasri III; Rudrasena II; Visvasimha	Miratakhma; Kozana; Bhimarjuna; Koziya; Datarvharna; Datarvharna	INDO-SASANIANS; Ardashir I, Sassanid king and "Kushanshah" (c. 230 – 250); Peroz I, "Kushanshah" (c. 250 – 265); Hormizd I, "Kushanshah" (c. 265 – 295)			Kanishka II (c. 230 – 240); Vashishka (c. 240 – 250); Kanishka III (c. 250 – 275)		
280-300 CE	Bhratadarman	Datayola II	Hormizd II, "Kushanshah" (c. 295 – 300)			Vasudeva II (c. 275 – 310)		
300-320 CE	Visvasena; Rudrasimha II; Jivadaman		Peroz II, "Kushanshah" (c. 300 – 325)			Vasudeva III; Vasudeva IV; Vasudeva V Chhu (c. 310? – 325)		
320-388 CE	Yasodaman II; Rudradaman II; Rudrasena III; Simhasena; Rudrasena IV		Shapur II Sassanid king and "Kushanshah" (c. 325); Varhran I, Varhran II, Varhran III "Kushanshahs" (c. 325 – 350); Peroz III "Kushanshah" (c. 350 –360); HEPHTHALITE/ HUNAS invasions			Shaka I (c. 325 – 345); Kipunada (c. 345 – 375)		GUPTA EMPIRE; Chandragupta I Samudragupta
388-395 CE	Rudrasimha III		Chandragupta II					
