= Artemidoros Aniketos =

1st-century BC Indo-Greek king

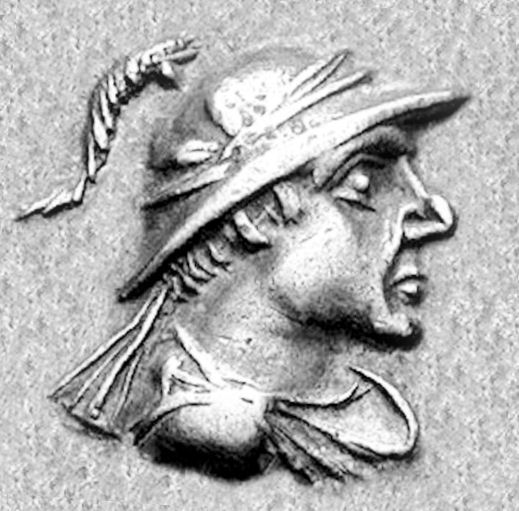
- Portrait of Artemidoros

Indo-Greek king
- Reign: 85–80 BC or 100–80 BC

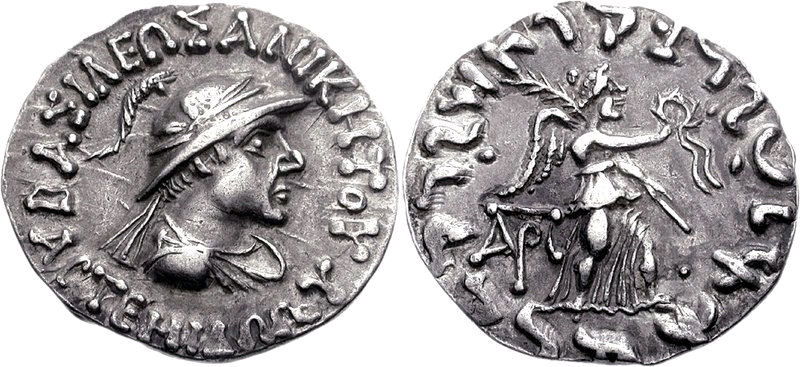
Silver coin of Artemidorus. With reverse showing winged goddess Nike. The Greek legend reads: ΒΑΣΙΛΕΩΣ ΑΝΙΚΗΤΟΥ ΑΡΤΕΜΙΔΩΡΟΥ, Basileōs Anikētou Artemidōrou, "Of the Invincible King Artemidorus"

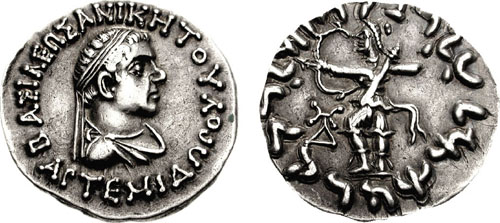
Silver coin of Artemidorus, wearing a diadem. With reverse showing goddess Artemis firing a curved bow. The Greek legend reads: ΒΑΣΙΛΕΩΣ ΑΝΙΚΗΤΟΥ ΑΡΤΕΜΙΔΩΡΟΥ, Basileōs Anikētou Artemidōrou, "Of the Invincible King Artemidorus".

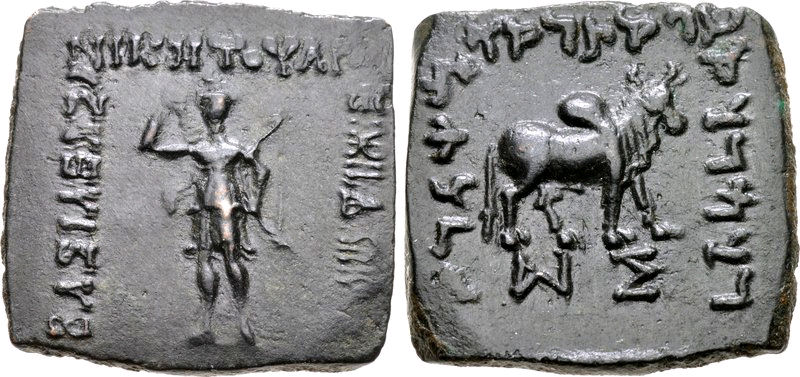
Artemidorus pedigree coin as son of Indo-Scythian ruler Maues. Obv. ΒΑΣΙΛΕΩΣ ΑΝΙΚΗΤΟΥ ΑΡΤΕΜΙΟΡΟΥ (Invincible King Artemidorus). Rev. Rajadirajasa Maasaputasa ca Artemidorasa "Artemidorus, son of King of Kings Maues" or alternatively "King of kings Maues, and the son of Artemidorus".

Artemidorus Anicetus (Greek: Ἀρτεμίδωρος ὁ Ἀνίκητος, Artemídōros ho Aníkētos, meaning "Artemidorus the Invincible") was a king who ruled in the area of Gandhara and Pushkalavati in modern northern Pakistan and Afghanistan.

== A son of Maues? ==
Artemidorus is a Greek name meaning "gift of Artemis", and has traditionally been seen as an Indo-Greek king. His remaining coins generally feature portraits of Artemidorus and Hellenistic deities and are typical of Indo-Greek rulers, but on a coin described by numismatician R. C. Senior, Artemidorus seems to claim to be the son of the Indo-Scythian king Maues. Not only does this coin enable a closer dating of Artemidorus; it also sheds new light on the transient ethnic identities during the decline of the Indo-Greek kingdom.

While Maues was 'Great King of Kings', Artemidorus only styled himself King; it appears as though he ruled only a smaller part of his father's dominions. He was either challenged by or ruled in tandem with other kings such as Menander II, whose coins have been found alongside his, and Apollodotus II.

=== New evaluation ===
In a 2009 article however, Osmund Bopearachchi disputes the interpretation of the coin according to which Artemidorus would be son of Maues. The analysis of several similar coins in good condition reveals that the obverse should be read rajatirajasa moasa putrasa ca artemidorosa, the ca (pronounced "cha") meaning "and", which opens the way to a possible translation being "King of kings Maues, and the son of Artemidorus". This would suggest that the son of Artemidorus would have issued coins in the name of his father, recognizing at the same time the suzerainty of Maues. In that case, Artemidorus would have been a regular Indo-Greek king, whose son simply made a transition with the rule of Maues.

== Time of rule ==
Bopearachchi has suggested a date of c. 85-80 BC, but this was before the appearance of the Maues coin. Senior's dating is wider, c. 100–80 BC, because Senior has given Maues an earlier date.

== Coins ==
During the 1990s, several new types of Artemidorus' coins appeared, of variable quality. R. C. Senior has suggested that Artemidorus relied mostly on temporary mints, perhaps because he held no major cities. All his coins were Indian bilinguals.

Silver:

Obverse: diademed or helmeted bust of king. Reverse: Artemis facing left or right, Nike facing left or right, or king on horseback.

Artemis, the eponymous goddess of hunting, is seen using a curved bow, which may have been typical of Scythian tribes and further supports his affiliation with them.

Bronzes:

Artemis / humped bull or Artemis / lion.

	Greco-Bactrian kings		Indo-Greek kings					
Territories/ dates	West Bactria	East Bactria	Paropamisade	Arachosia	Gandhara	Western Punjab	Eastern Punjab	Mathura
326-325 BCE	Campaigns of Alexander the Great in India						Nanda Empire	
312 BCE	Creation of the Seleucid Empire						Creation of the Maurya Empire	
305 BCE	Seleucid Empire after Mauryan war		Maurya Empire					
280 BCE	Foundation of Ai-Khanoum							
255–239 BCE	Independence of the Greco-Bactrian kingdom Diodotus I		Emperor Ashoka (268-232 BCE)					
239–223 BCE	Diodotus II							
230–200 BCE	Euthydemus I							
200–190 BCE	Demetrius I				Sunga Empire			
190-185 BCE	Euthydemus II							
190–180 BCE	Agathocles			Pantaleon				
185–170 BCE	Antimachus I							
180–160 BCE			Apollodotus I					
175–170 BCE	Demetrius II							
160–155 BCE			Antimachus II					
170–145 BCE	Eucratides I							
155–130 BCE	Yuezhi occupation, loss of Ai-Khanoum	Eucratides II; Plato; Heliocles I	Menander I					
130–120 BCE	Yuezhi occupation		Zoilus I		Agathoclea			Yavanarajya inscription
120–110 BCE			Lysias		Strato I			Yavanarajya inscription
110–100 BCE			Antialcidas		Heliocles II			Yavanarajya inscription
100 BCE			Polyxenus		Demetrius III			Yavanarajya inscription
100–95 BCE			Philoxenus					Yavanarajya inscription
95–90 BCE			Diomedes	Amyntas		Epander		Yavanarajya inscription
90 BCE			Theophilus	Peucolaus		Thraso		Yavanarajya inscription
90–85 BCE			Nicias	Menander II		Artemidorus		Yavanarajya inscription
90–70 BCE			Hermaeus	Archebius				Yavanarajya inscription
			Yuezhi occupation		Maues (Indo-Scythian)			
75–70 BCE				Vonones	Telephus	Apollodotus II		
65–55 BCE				Spalirises		Hippostratus	Dionysius	
55–35 BCE					Azes I (Indo-Scythians)		Zoilus II	
55–35 BCE					Vijayamitra/ Azilises		Apollophanes	
25 BCE – 10 CE				Gondophares	Zeionises	Kharahostes	Strato II; Strato III	
				Gondophares (Indo-Parthian)			Rajuvula (Indo-Scythian)	
			Kujula Kadphises (Kushan Empire)				Bhadayasa (Indo-Scythian)	Sodasa (Indo-Scythian)

== See also ==
- Greco-Bactrian Kingdom
- Seleucid Empire
- Greco-Buddhism
- Indo-Scythians
- Indo-Parthian Kingdom
- Kushan Empire

Preceded by Maues	Indo-Greek Ruler (in Punjab) c. 80 BC	Succeeded by Apollodotus II
