= Archebius =

Archebius Dikaios Nikephoros
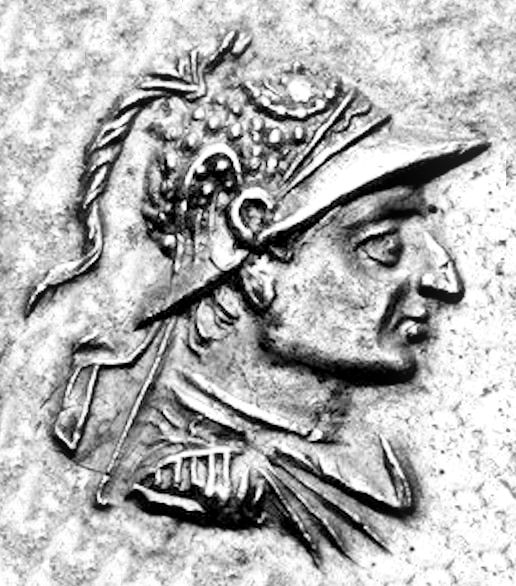
- Portrait of Archebios on one of his tetradrachms

Indo-Greek king
- Reign: 90–80 BC

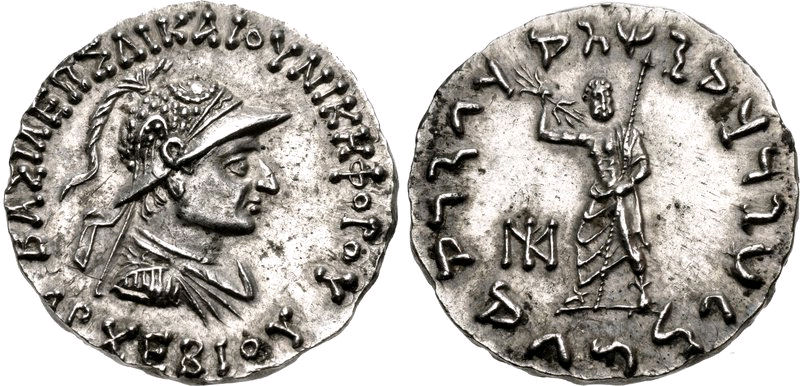
Tetradrachm of Archebios. Obv: Helmetted king Archebius. Greek legend: ΒΑΣΙΛΕΩΣ ΔΙΚΑΙΟΥ ΝΙΚΗΦΟΡΟΥ ΑΡΧΕΒΙΟΥ "Of King Archebius the Just and Victorious" Rev: Zeus, with Kharoshthi legend: MAHARAJASA DHRAMIKASA JAYADHARASA ARKHEBIYASA "Archebios, the victorious king of the Dharma.

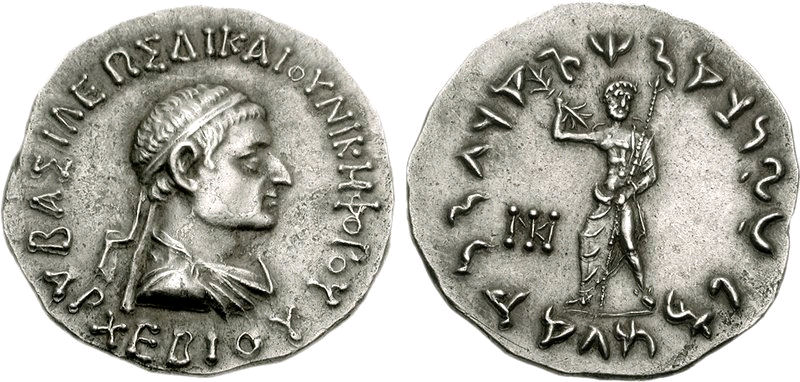
Coin of Archebius. Obv: Bareheaded king Archebius. With Greek legend: ΒΑΣΙΛΕΩΣ ΔΙΚΑΙΟΥ ΝΙΚΗΦΟΡΟΥ ΑΡΧΕΒΙΟΥ "Of King Archebius the Just and Victorious" Rev: Zeus, with Kharoshthi legend: MAHARAJASA DHRAMIKASA JAYADHARASA ARKHEBIYASA "Archebios, the victorious king of the Dharma.

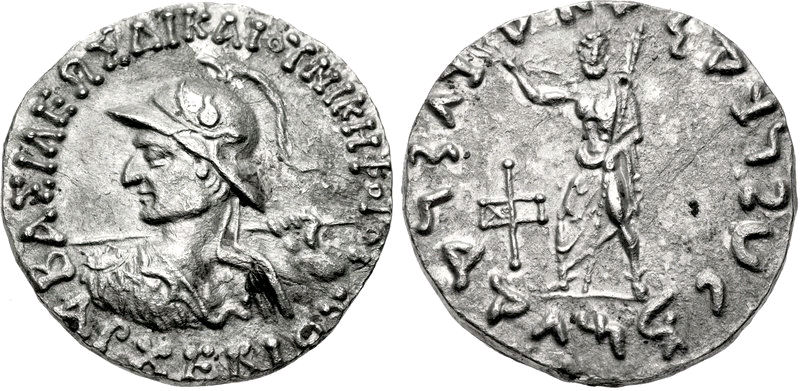
Coin of Archebius. Obv: Helmetted king Archebius holding a spear. With Greek legend: ΒΑΣΙΛΕΩΣ ΔΙΚΑΙΟΥ ΝΙΚΗΦΟΡΟΥ ΑΡΧΕΒΙΟΥ "Of King Archebius the Just and Victorious" Rev: Zeus, with Kharoshthi legend: MAHARAJASA DHRAMIKASA JAYADHARASA ARKHEBIYASA "Archebios, the victorious king of the Dharma.

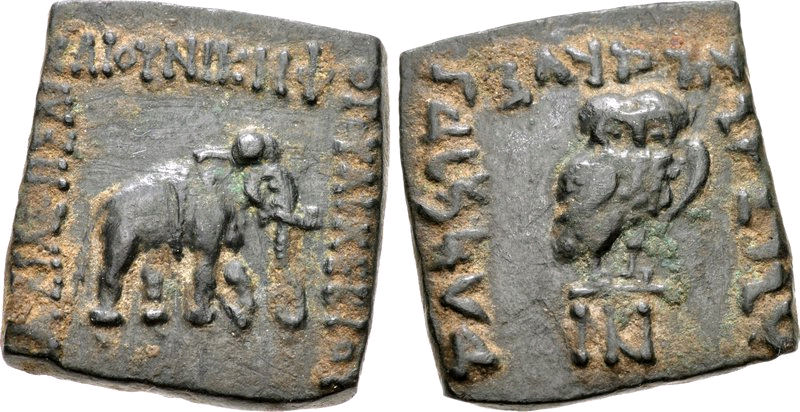
Archebios coin with elephant and owl.

Archebius Dikaios Nikephoros (Greek: Ἀρχέβιος ὁ Δίκαιος, ὁ Νικηφόρος; epithets mean respectively, "the Just", "the Victorious"; formerly read as "Archelius") was an Indo-Greek king who ruled in the area of Taxila. Osmund Bopearachchi dates him to c. 90–80 BC, and R. C. Senior to about the same period. He was probably one of the last Indo-Greek kings before the Saka king Maues conquered Taxila, and a contemporary of Hermaeus in the west. He may have been a relative of Heliokles II, who used a similar reverse and also the title Dikaios.

== Coin types ==
Archebius' name means "ruler of life" deriving from ἄρχω (“to rule”) and βίος ("life”). He issued silver with diademed or helmeted king, sometimes in spear-throwing pose. On the reverse is Zeus standing facing, holding a thunderbolt or on some issues an aegis.

Archebius also struck a rare series of Attic tetradrachms, found in Bactria.

He also issued bronzes with Nike on one side and an owl on the other.

== Overstrikes ==
Archebius overstruck two coins of Peukolaos.

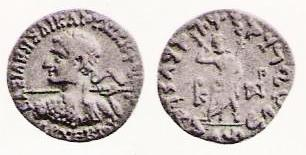
King thrusting javelin, with Zeus holding thunderbolt.

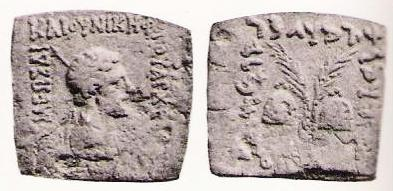
Bust of Zeus, and caps of the Dioscuri with palms.

	Greco-Bactrian kings		Indo-Greek kings					
Territories/ dates	West Bactria	East Bactria	Paropamisade	Arachosia	Gandhara	Western Punjab	Eastern Punjab	Mathura
326-325 BCE	Campaigns of Alexander the Great in India						Nanda Empire	
312 BCE	Creation of the Seleucid Empire						Creation of the Maurya Empire	
305 BCE	Seleucid Empire after Mauryan war		Maurya Empire					
280 BCE	Foundation of Ai-Khanoum							
255–239 BCE	Independence of the Greco-Bactrian kingdom Diodotus I		Emperor Ashoka (268-232 BCE)					
239–223 BCE	Diodotus II							
230–200 BCE	Euthydemus I							
200–190 BCE	Demetrius I				Sunga Empire			
190-185 BCE	Euthydemus II							
190–180 BCE	Agathocles			Pantaleon				
185–170 BCE	Antimachus I							
180–160 BCE			Apollodotus I					
175–170 BCE	Demetrius II							
160–155 BCE			Antimachus II					
170–145 BCE	Eucratides I							
155–130 BCE	Yuezhi occupation, loss of Ai-Khanoum	Eucratides II; Plato; Heliocles I	Menander I					
130–120 BCE	Yuezhi occupation		Zoilus I		Agathoclea			Yavanarajya inscription
120–110 BCE			Lysias		Strato I			Yavanarajya inscription
110–100 BCE			Antialcidas		Heliocles II			Yavanarajya inscription
100 BCE			Polyxenus		Demetrius III			Yavanarajya inscription
100–95 BCE			Philoxenus					Yavanarajya inscription
95–90 BCE			Diomedes	Amyntas		Epander		Yavanarajya inscription
90 BCE			Theophilus	Peucolaus		Thraso		Yavanarajya inscription
90–85 BCE			Nicias	Menander II		Artemidorus		Yavanarajya inscription
90–70 BCE			Hermaeus	Archebius				Yavanarajya inscription
			Yuezhi occupation		Maues (Indo-Scythian)			
75–70 BCE				Vonones	Telephus	Apollodotus II		
65–55 BCE				Spalirises		Hippostratus	Dionysius	
55–35 BCE					Azes I (Indo-Scythians)		Zoilus II	
55–35 BCE					Vijayamitra/ Azilises		Apollophanes	
25 BCE – 10 CE				Gondophares	Zeionises	Kharahostes	Strato II; Strato III	
				Gondophares (Indo-Parthian)			Rajuvula (Indo-Scythian)	
			Kujula Kadphises (Kushan Empire)				Bhadayasa (Indo-Scythian)	Sodasa (Indo-Scythian)

Preceded by Menander II as ruler in Arachosia and Gandhara	Indo-Greek ruler in Arachosia, Gandhara and Punjab; 90–80 BC	Succeeded by Maues as Indo-Scythian king
Preceded by Artemidoros as ruler in Punjab	Indo-Greek ruler in Arachosia, Gandhara and Punjab; 90–80 BC	Succeeded by Maues as Indo-Scythian king
