= Kamsabhoga =

Ancient country

Kamsabhoga (or Kamsabhoja) was the name of an ancient country said to be located in the Uttarapatha division of ancient India with its capital being Asitañjana, where king Mahākamsa and his successors of the Kamsavamsa race ruled. Name Kamsabhoga finds mention in the Buddhist traditions only. The Kamsavamsa dynasty was destroyed by the sons of Devagabbha and Upasagara known in the Buddhist texts as Andhakavenhudasaputta

== See also ==
- Dictionary of Pali Proper Names:
