= Amyntas Nicator =

Amyntas
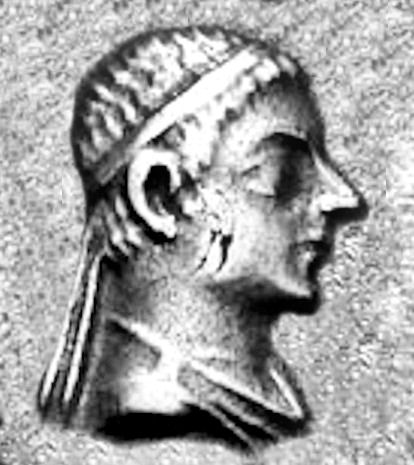
- Portrait of young Amyntas

Indo-Greek king
- Reign: 95–90 BCE

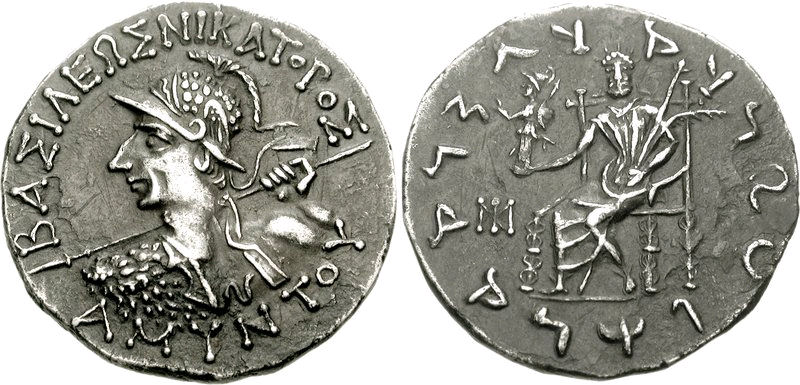
Silver coin of Amyntas Nicator. Obverse shows the king wearing a decorated helmet and holding a spear, and with Greek legend: ΒΑΣΙΛΕΩΣ ΝΙΚΑΤΟΡΟΣ ΑΜΥΝΤΟΥ, Basileos Nikatoros Amyntou, "of King Amyntas the Victor". The reverse shows seated Zeus holding Athena and scepter. The Kharoshti legend reads: Maharajasa Jayadharasa Amitasa, "of the Great King Amyntas the Victor".

Amyntas Nicator (Ancient Greek: Ἀμύντας Νικάτωρ, Amýntas Nikátōr, meaning "Amyntas the Victor") was an Indo-Greek king. His coins have been found both in eastern Punjab and Afghanistan, indicating that he ruled a considerable territory.

== Date ==
Bopearachchi places Amyntas c. 95–90 BCE, whereas Senior places him c. 80–65 BCE.

== Coinage ==
Amyntas struck mainly bilingual silver coins with a variety of portraits. The obverse of these coins show the king wearing either a diadem alone, a kausia hat, or two different types of helmets. Most of these bear the reverse of a sitting Zeus holding a victory palm and a small figure of Athena, which according to R. C. Senior may have indicated an alliance between the house of Menander I and the house of Antialcidas. Some of his coins feature the reverse of fighting Athena typical for Menander's descendants. The epithet Nikator (Victor) was previously used only on the Bactrian coins of Agathocles to commemorate a certain Antiochus, almost a century before Amyntas' reign.

Amyntas, likely meaning "defender", was a common Macedonian name. It was borne by rulers from the dynasty of Alexander the Great, and also by the famous king's generals.

Amyntas shared the coin monograms of several Indo-Greek kings such as Heliocles II, Hermaeus, Polyxenus, Philoxenus and Diomedes. His bronze coins feature the syncretic deity Zeus-Mithra wearing a phrygian cap and Athena standing at rest, both forming the vitarka mudra.

Amyntas also minted the largest silver coins of antiquity: double-decadrachms. These huge coins each have a diameter of about 65 mm and a weight of 85 g. A total of five such coins were found as part of a hoard from Khisht Tepe in northern Afghanistan, which is commonly known as the Qunduz hoard. Three of the coins shows the goddess Tyche seated and holding a cornucopia, while two of them show a seated Zeus holding Athena. Besides these amazing coins, no other Attic coins of Amyntas are currently known.

=== Overstrikes ===
Amyntas is known to have overstruck coins of Heliocles II.

== Gallery ==
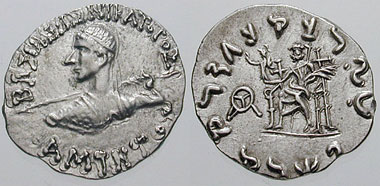
Another silver coin of Amyntas. The obverse shows the king's portrait holding a spear, with surrounding Greek legend. The reverse shows seated Zeus holding Athena, and with surrounding Kharoshti legend.

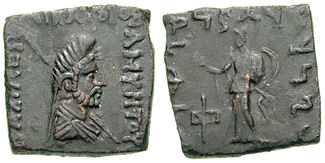
Indian-standard coin of Amyntas, with obverse showing the bust of Zeus-Mitra wearing a phrygian cap, and surrounding Greek legend. The reverse showing standing Athena in armour and with surrounding Kharoshti legend.

== See also ==
- Greco-Bactrian Kingdom
- Greco-Buddhism
- Indo-Scythians
- Indo-Parthian Kingdom
- Kushan Empire

| | Greco-Bactrian kings | | Indo-Greek kings | | | | | |
| Territories/ dates | West Bactria | East Bactria | Paropamisade | Arachosia | Gandhara | Western Punjab | Eastern Punjab | Mathura |
| 326-325 BCE | Campaigns of Alexander the Great in India | | | | | | Nanda Empire | |
| 312 BCE | Creation of the Seleucid Empire | | | | | | Creation of the Maurya Empire | |
| 305 BCE | Seleucid Empire after Mauryan war | | Maurya Empire | | | | | |
| 280 BCE | Foundation of Ai-Khanoum | | | | | | | |
| 255–239 BCE | Independence of the Greco-Bactrian kingdom Diodotus I | | Emperor Ashoka (268-232 BCE) | | | | | |
| 239–223 BCE | Diodotus II | | | | | | | |
| 230–200 BCE | Euthydemus I | | | | | | | |
| 200–190 BCE | Demetrius I | | | | Sunga Empire | | | |
| 190-185 BCE | Euthydemus II | | | | | | | |
| 190–180 BCE | Agathocles | | | Pantaleon | | | | |
| 185–170 BCE | Antimachus I | | | | | | | |
| 180–160 BCE | | | Apollodotus I | | | | | |
| 175–170 BCE | Demetrius II | | | | | | | |
| 160–155 BCE | | | Antimachus II | | | | | |
| 170–145 BCE | Eucratides I | | | | | | | |
| 155–130 BCE | Yuezhi occupation, loss of Ai-Khanoum | Eucratides II; Plato; Heliocles I | Menander I | | | | | |
| 130–120 BCE | Yuezhi occupation | | Zoilus I | | Agathoclea | | | Yavanarajya inscription |
| 120–110 BCE | | | Lysias | | Strato I | | | Yavanarajya inscription |
| 110–100 BCE | | | Antialcidas | | Heliocles II | | | Yavanarajya inscription |
| 100 BCE | | | Polyxenus | | Demetrius III | | | Yavanarajya inscription |
| 100–95 BCE | | | Philoxenus | | | | | Yavanarajya inscription |
| 95–90 BCE | | | Diomedes | Amyntas | | Epander | | Yavanarajya inscription |
| 90 BCE | | | Theophilus | Peucolaus | | Thraso | | Yavanarajya inscription |
| 90–85 BCE | | | Nicias | Menander II | | Artemidorus | | Yavanarajya inscription |
| 90–70 BCE | | | Hermaeus | Archebius | | | | Yavanarajya inscription |
| | | | Yuezhi occupation | | Maues (Indo-Scythian) | | | |
| 75–70 BCE | | | | Vonones | Telephus | Apollodotus II | | |
| 65–55 BCE | | | | Spalirises | | Hippostratus | Dionysius | |
| 55–35 BCE | | | | | Azes I (Indo-Scythians) | | Zoilus II | |
| 55–35 BCE | | | | | Vijayamitra/ Azilises | | Apollophanes | |
| 25 BCE – 10 CE | | | | Gondophares | Zeionises | Kharahostes | Strato II; Strato III | |
| | | | | Gondophares (Indo-Parthian) | | | Rajuvula (Indo-Scythian) | |
| | | | Kujula Kadphises (Kushan Empire) | | | | Bhadayasa (Indo-Scythian) | Sodasa (Indo-Scythian) |
