= Indo-Greek religions =

Religions of the Indo-Greeks (c. 200 BCE)

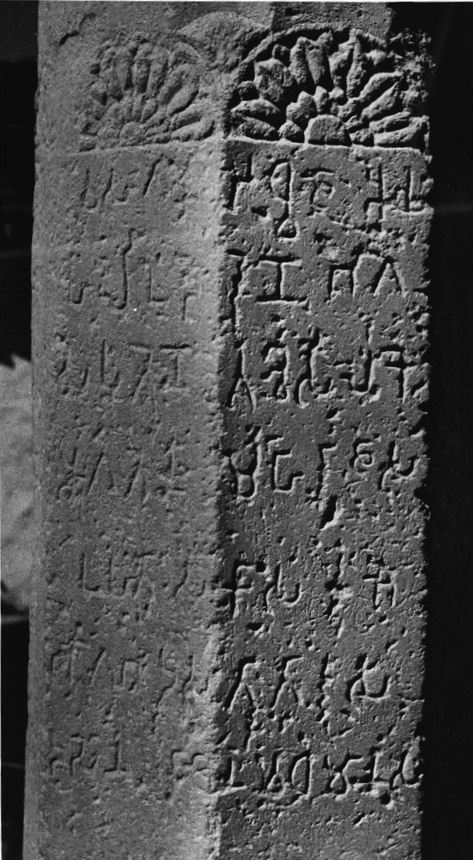
The Heliodorus pillar, commissioned by Indo-Greek ambassador Heliodorus, one of the earliest recorded Indo-Greek converts to Hinduism.

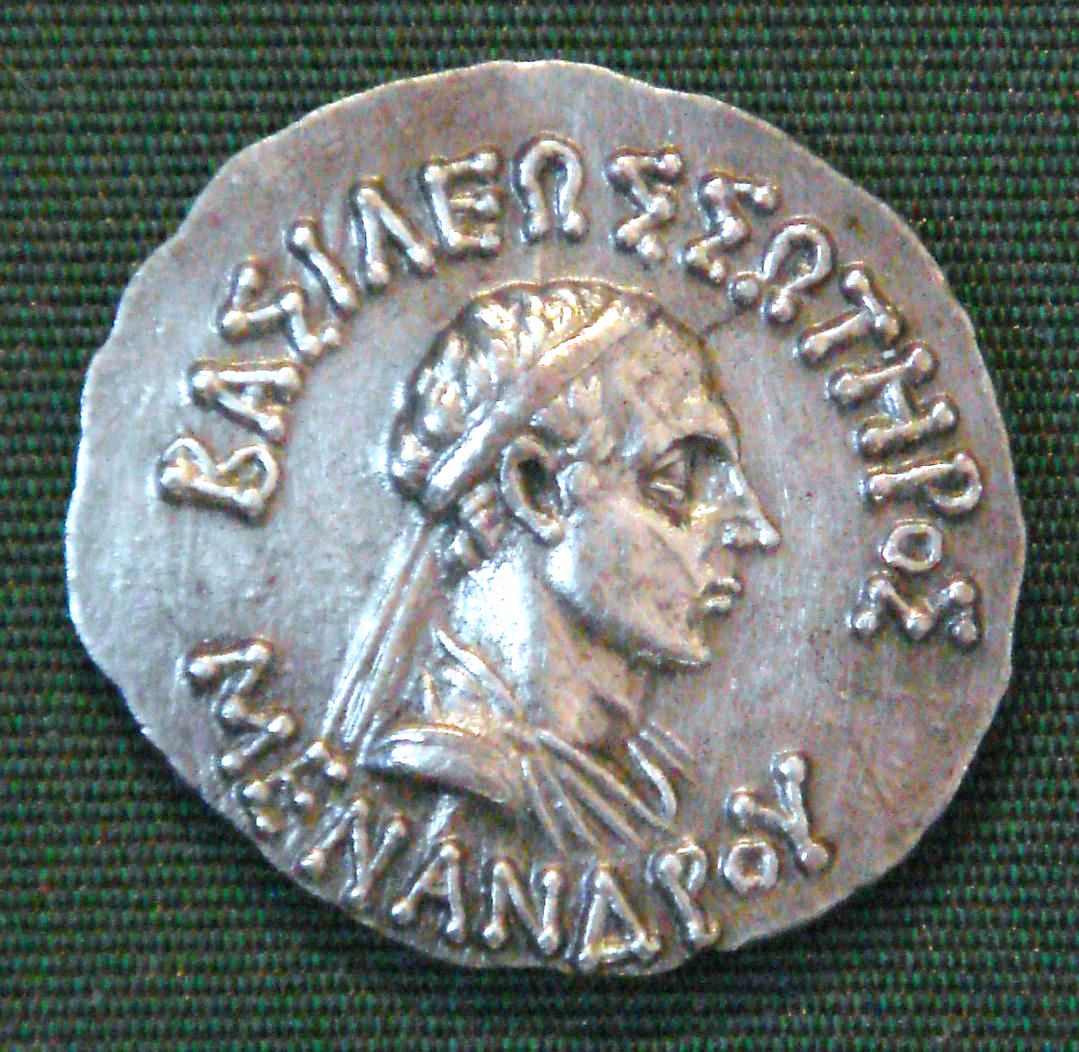
Menander I converted to Buddhism, as described in the Milinda Panha. After his conversion, he became noted for being a leading patron of Buddhism.

The Indo-Greeks practiced numerous religions during the time they ruled in the northwestern Indian subcontinent from the 2nd century BCE to the beginning of the 1st century CE. In addition to the worship of the Classical pantheon of the Greek deities found on their coins (e.g., Zeus, Herakles, Athena, Apollo), the Indo-Greeks were involved with local faiths, particularly with Buddhism, but also with Hinduism and Zoroastrianism.

== Buddhism ==
After the Greco-Bactrians militarily occupied parts of northern India from around 180 BCE, numerous instances of interaction between Greeks and Buddhism are recorded.

=== The conversion of Menander ===
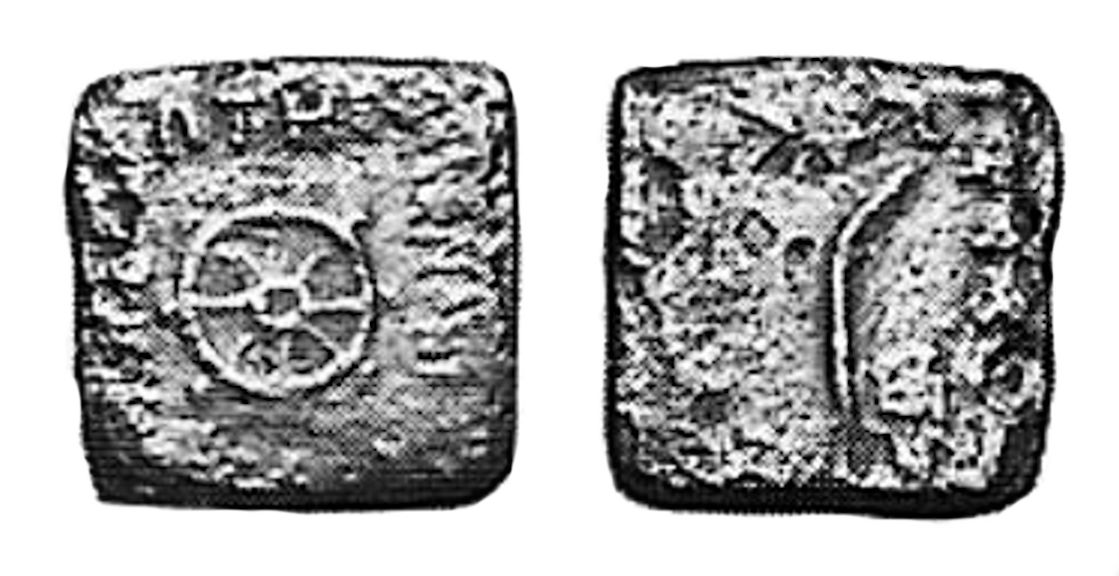
Indian-standard coinage of Menander I with an eight-spoked wheel and a palm of victory on the reverse (British Museum).

Menander I, the "Saviour king", is documented to have converted to Buddhism, and is described in Buddhist texts as a great benefactor of the religion. Menander, appears to have proselytized the faith through his domain similar to the Mauryan Ashoka and the future Kushan emperor Kanishka. He is famous for his dialogues with the Buddhist monk Nagasena, transmitted to us in the Milinda Panha, which explain that he became a Buddhist arhat:

"And afterwards, taking delight in the wisdom of the Elder, he (Menander) handed over his kingdom to his son, and abandoning the household life for the house-less state, grew great in insight, and himself attained to Arahatship!"

— The Questions of King Milinda, Translation by T. W. Rhys Davids.

Another Indian writing, the Stupavadana of Ksemendra, mentions in the form of a prophecy that Menander will build a stupa in Pataliputra.

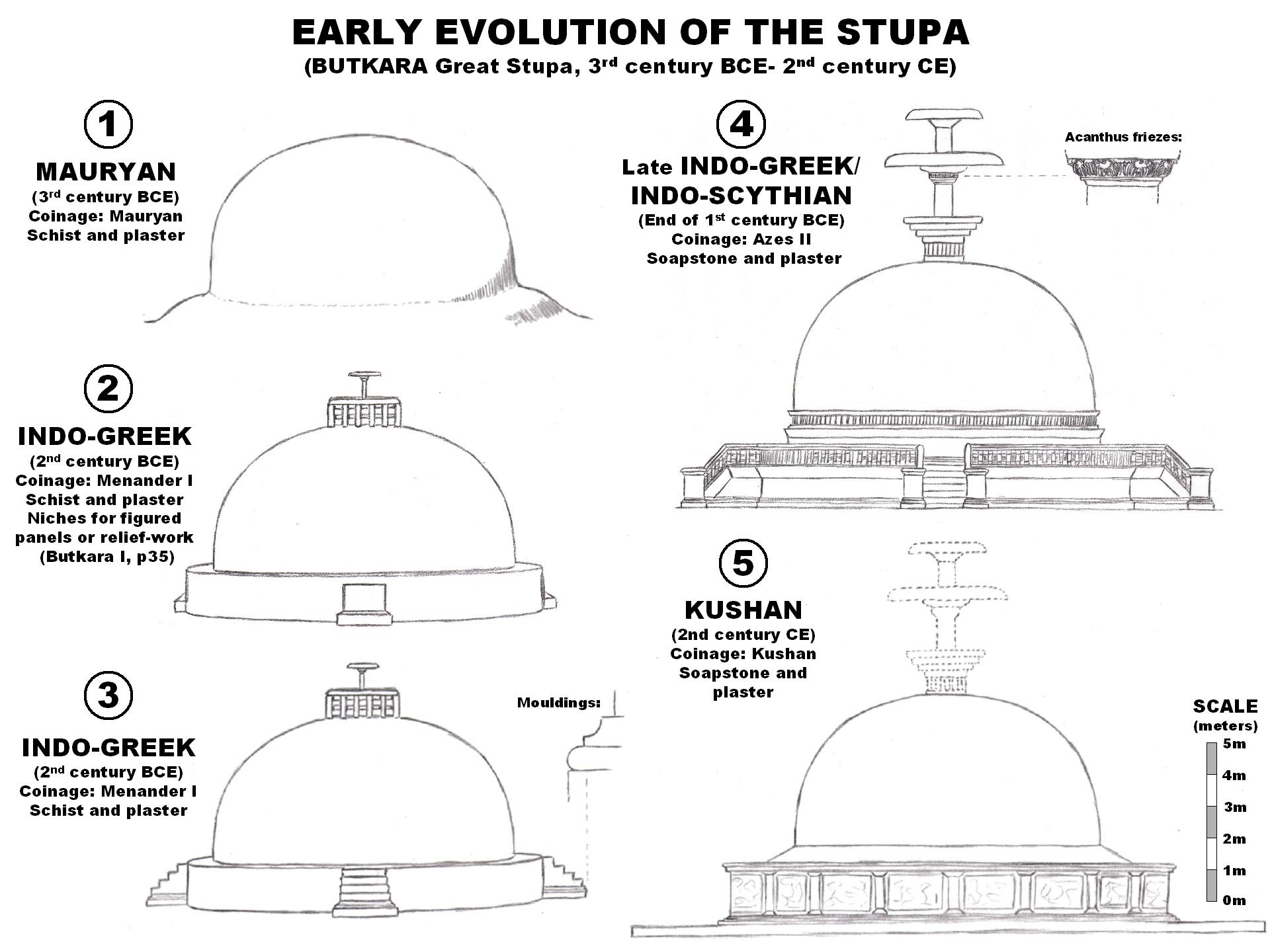
Evolution of the Butkara stupa, a large part of which occurred during the Indo-Greek period, with the addition of Hellenistic architectural elements.

Plutarch also presents Menander as an example of benevolent rule, and explains that upon his death, the honour of sharing his remains was claimed by the various cities under his rule, and they were enshrined in "monuments" (μνημεία, probably stupas), in a parallel with the historic Buddha:

"But when one Menander, who had reigned graciously over the Bactrians, died afterwards in the camp, the cities indeed by common consent celebrated his funerals; but coming to a contest about his relics, they were difficultly at last brought to this agreement, that his ashes being distributed, everyone should carry away an equal share, and they should all erect monuments to him."

— Plutarch, "Political Precepts" Praec. reip. ger. 28, 6).

The Butkara stupa was "monumentalized" by the addition of Hellenistic architectural decorations during Indo-Greek rule in 2nd century BCE.

Some Buddhist inscriptions also mention the name of Menander, suggesting intense Buddhist activity under his sponsorship:

"On the 14th day of Kārrtika, in the reign of Mahārāja Minadra, (in the year...), (the corporeal relic of the Buddha), which is endowed with life... has been established. (The corporeal relic) of Sakamuni, which is endowed with life..."

— Bajaur casket inscription.

=== Buddhist proselytism ===
There are records of the involvement of Greeks in Buddhist pilgrimages. During the reign of Menander, the Greek (Pali: Yona, lit: "Ionian") Buddhist monk Mahadhammarakkhita (Sanskrit: Mahadharmaraksita, lit. "Great protector of the Dharma") is said to have come from Alasandra (thought to be Alexandria of the Caucasus, the city founded by Alexander the Great, near today's Kabul) with 30,000 monks for the foundation ceremony of the Maha Thupa ("Great stupa") built by king Dutthagamani at Anuradhapura in Sri Lanka around 130 BCE, indicating the importance of Buddhism within Greek communities in northwestern India, and the prominent role Greek Buddhist monks played in them:

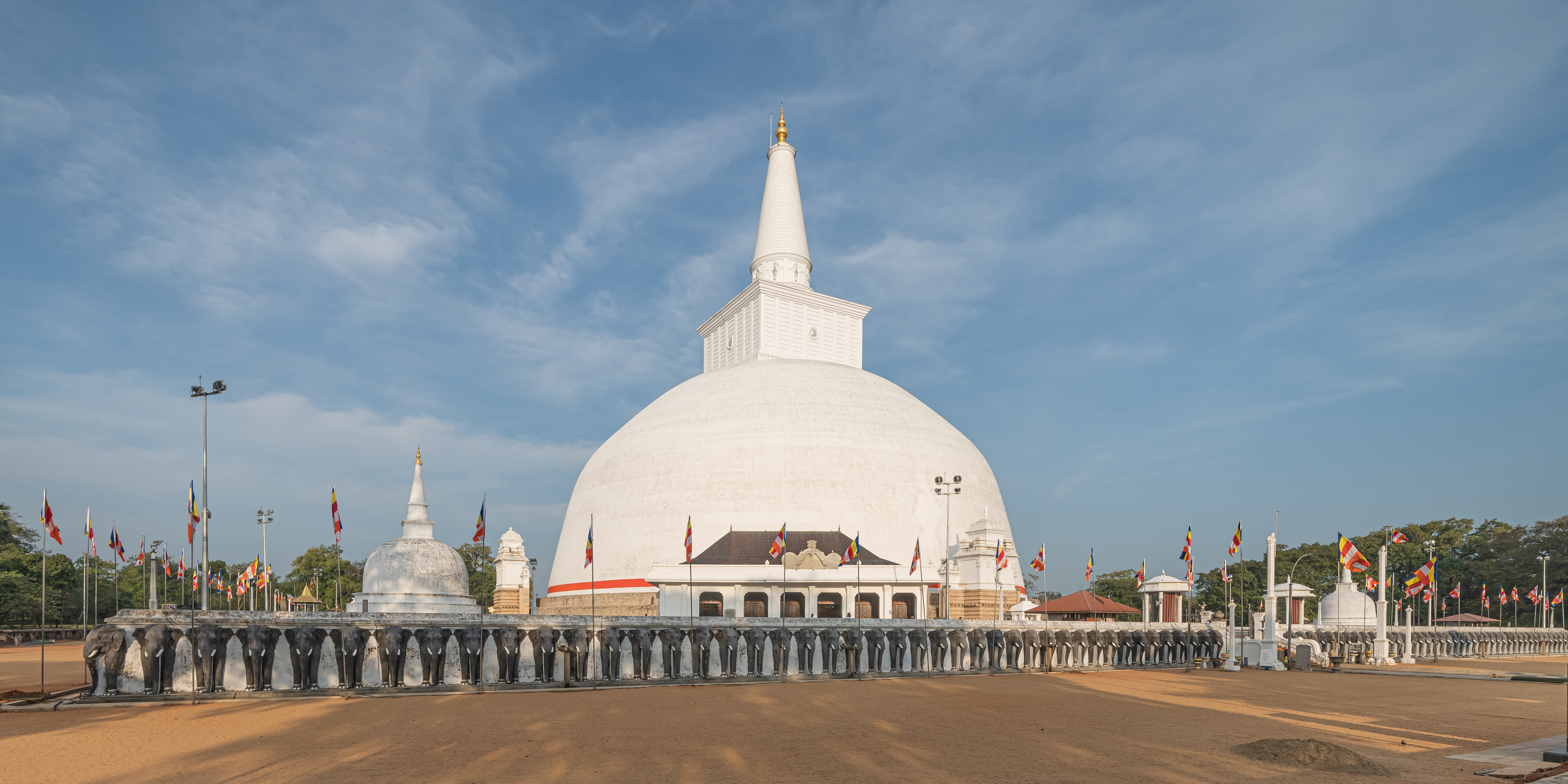
According to the Mahavamsa, the Great Stupa in Anuradhapura, Sri Lanka, was dedicated by a 30,000-strong "Yona" delegation from "Alexandria" around 130 BCE.

"From Alasanda the city of the Yonas came the elder Yona Mahadhammarakkhita with thirty thousand bhikkhus."

— Mahavamsa, XXIX)

Several Buddhist dedications by Greeks in India are recorded, such as that of the Greek meridarch (civil governor of part of a province) named Theodorus, describing in Kharoshthi how he enshrined relics of the Buddha. The inscriptions were found on a vase inside a stupa, dated to the reign of Menander or one of his successors in the 1st century BCE (Tarn, p391):

"The meridarch Theodorus has enshrined relics of Lord Shakyamuni, for the welfare of the mass of the people"

— (Swāt relic vase inscription of the Meridarkh Theodoros)

Although the spread of Buddhism to Central Asia and Northern Asia is usually associated with the Kushans, a century or two later, there is a possibility that it may have been introduced in those areas from Gandhara "even earlier, during the time of Demetrius and Menander". There is however some textual evidence to suggest that Buddhism had penetrated much earlier to Central Asia, at least in a limited form: the first two disciples of the Buddha were named Tapassu and Bhallika, from the region of Balhika (the present Balkh, and Sanskrit for Bactria), and though it cannot necessarily be presumed that any extensive prosyletization occurred on their return journey, that the Sanskrit name for Bactria derived from the name of a Bactrian-Buddhist disciple is suggestive of some early influence. Bhallika and Tapassu were both travellers, and if nothing else, the story of their conversion and their home region's Sanskrit nomenclature illustrates the possibility of early transmission via the local trade routes.

=== Buddhist symbolism ===
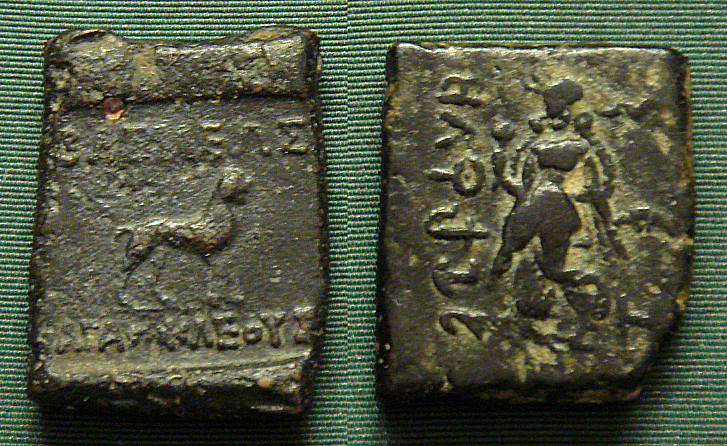
Indian coinage of Agathocles, with Buddhist lion and Hindu goddess Lakshmi.

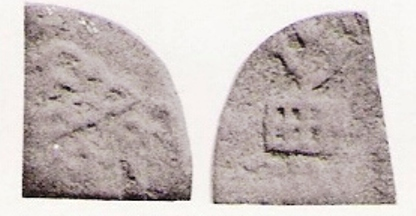
Indian coinage of Agathocles, with Chaitya-hill, and tree in railing.

From around 180 BCE, Agathocles and Pantaleon, probable successors to Demetrius I in the Paropamisadae, and the earliest Greek kings to issue Indian-standard square bilingual coins (in Brahmi), depicted the Buddhist lion together with the Hindu goddess Lakshmi.

Some coins of Agathocles in the Indian standard also show a six-arched stupa and a tree in a railing, typical symbol of the Bodhi tree in early Buddhism. These coins show an unprecedented willingness to adapt to every aspect of the local culture: shape of the coinage, coinage size, language, and religion.

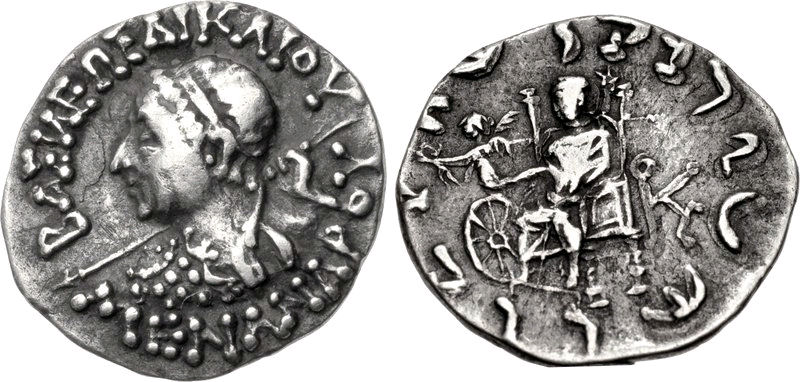
Silver Drachm of Menander II 90–85 BCE with Zeus enthroned, holding Nike and scepter, and Nike handing a victory wreath over an eight-spoked wheel

Later, some Indo-Greek coins incorporate the Buddhist symbol of the eight-spoked wheel, such as those of Menander I, as well as his possible grandson Menander II. On these coins, the wheel is associated with the Greek symbols of victory, either the palm of victory, or the victory wreath handed over by the goddess Nike. This symbology has led some to conclude that Menander adopted the Buddhist mantle of a "Chakravartin" during his lifetime; lit., "one for whom the wheel of law turns," translated as "King of the Wheel" in Western texts.

The ubiquitous symbol of the elephant may or may not have been associated with Buddhism. On some coin series of Antialcidas, the elephant holds the same relationship to Zeus and Nike as the Buddhist wheel on the coin of Menander II, tending to suggest a common meaning for both symbols. Some of the earlier coins of king Apollodotus I directly associate the elephant with Buddhist symbolism, such as the stupa hill surmounted by a star, also seen, for example on the coins of the Mauryan Empire or those of the later Kuninda kingdom. Conversely, the bull is probably associated with Shiva, and often described in an erectile state as on the coins of Apollodotus I.

Also, after the reign of Menander I, several Indo-Greek rulers, such as Agathokleia, Amyntas, Nicias, Peukolaos, Hermaeus, Hippostratos, Menander II and Philoxenus depicted themselves or their Greek deities forming with the right hand a benediction gesture identical to the Buddhist vitarka mudra (thumb and index joined together, with other fingers extended), which in Buddhism signifies the transmission of the Buddha's teaching.

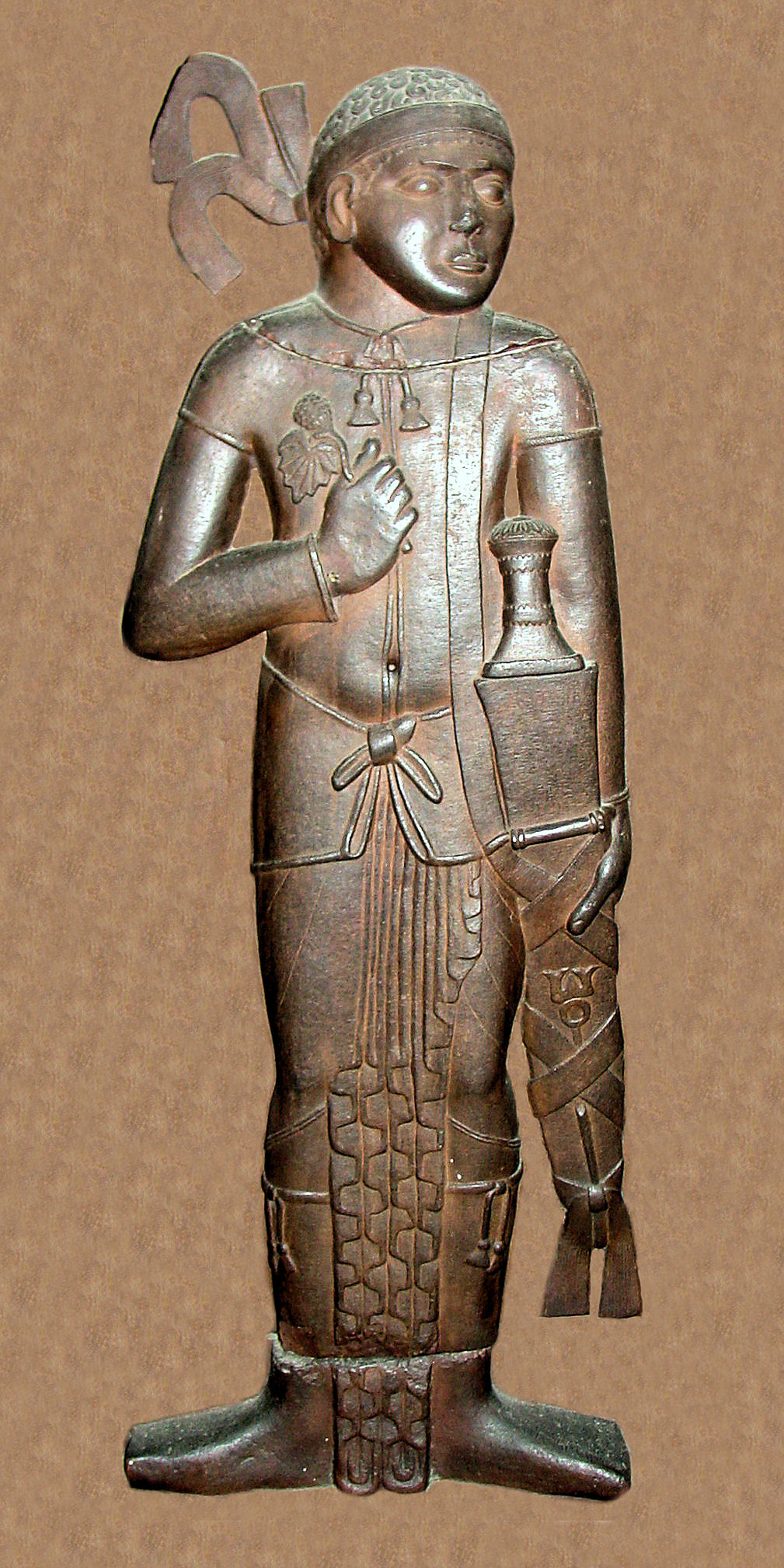
Indian relief of probable Indo-Greek king (Susan Huntington, "The art of ancient India"), with Buddhist triratana symbol on his sword. Barhut stupa, 2nd century BCE. Indian Museum, Calcutta (drawing).

At precisely the same time, right after the death of Menander, several Indo-Greek rulers also started to adopt on their coins the Pali title of "Dharmikasa", meaning "follower of the Dharma" (the title of the great Indian Buddhist king Ashoka was Dharmaraja "King of the Dharma"). This usage was adopted by Strato I, Zoilos I, Heliokles II, Theophilos, Peukolaos, Menander II and Archebios.

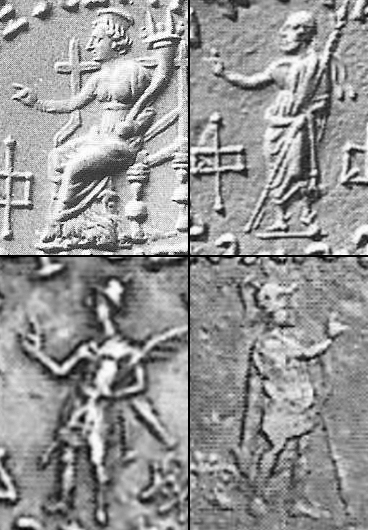
Blessing gestures, identical to the Vitarka Mudra, on Indo-Greek coinage. Top: Divinities Tyche and Zeus. Bottom: Depiction of Indo-Greek kings Nicias and Menander II.

Altogether, the conversion of Menander I to Buddhism suggested by the Milinda Panha seems to have triggered the use of Buddhist symbolism in one form or another on the coinage of close to half of the kings who succeeded him. Especially, all the kings after Menander who are recorded to have ruled in Gandhara (apart from the little-known Demetrius III) display Buddhist symbolism in one form or another. On the contrary, none of the kings whose rule was limited to Punjab did display Buddhist signs, with the exception of the powerful Hippostratos, who probably took under his protection many Gandharan Greeks fleeing from the Indo-Scythians.

A 2nd century BCE relief from a Buddhist stupa in Bharhut, in eastern Madhya Pradesh (today at the Indian Museum in Calcutta), represents a foreign soldier with the curly hair of a Greek and the royal headband with flowing ends of a Greek king. In his left hand, he holds a branch of ivy, symbol of Dionysos. Also parts of his dress, with rows of geometrical folds, are characteristically Hellenistic in style. On his sword appears the Buddhist symbol of the three jewels, or Triratana.

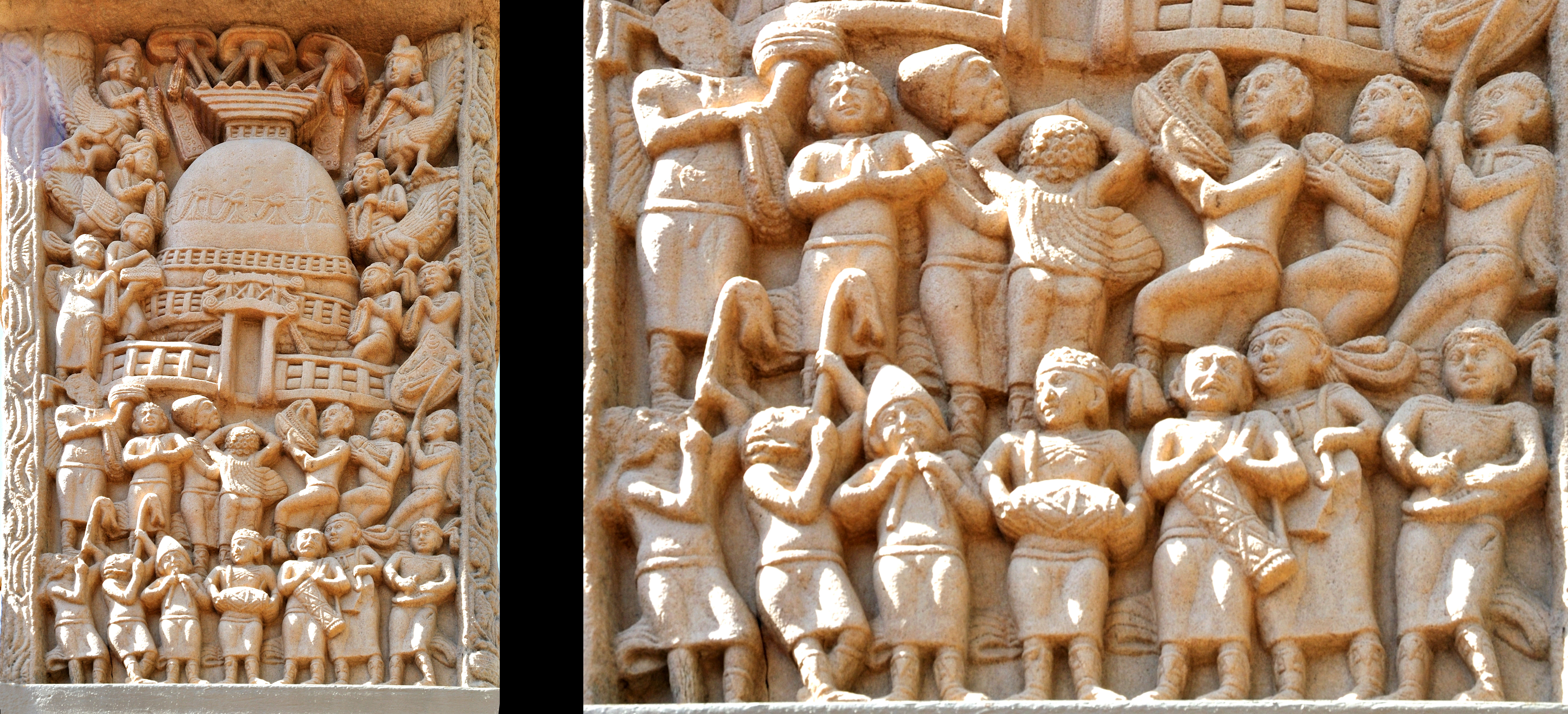
Foreigners on the Northern Gateway of Stupa I at Sanchi.

One frieze of Sanchi, dated to the 2nd century BCE during the Satavahana period, also shows devotees in Greek attire and activities. The men are depicted with short curly hair, often held together with a headband of the type commonly seen on Greek coins. The clothing too is Greek, complete with tunics, capes and sandals. The musical instruments are also quite characteristic, such as the double flute called aulos. Also visible are carnyx-like horns. They are all celebrating at the entrance of the stupa. These men would probably be nearby Indo-Greeks.

=== Representation of the Buddha ===
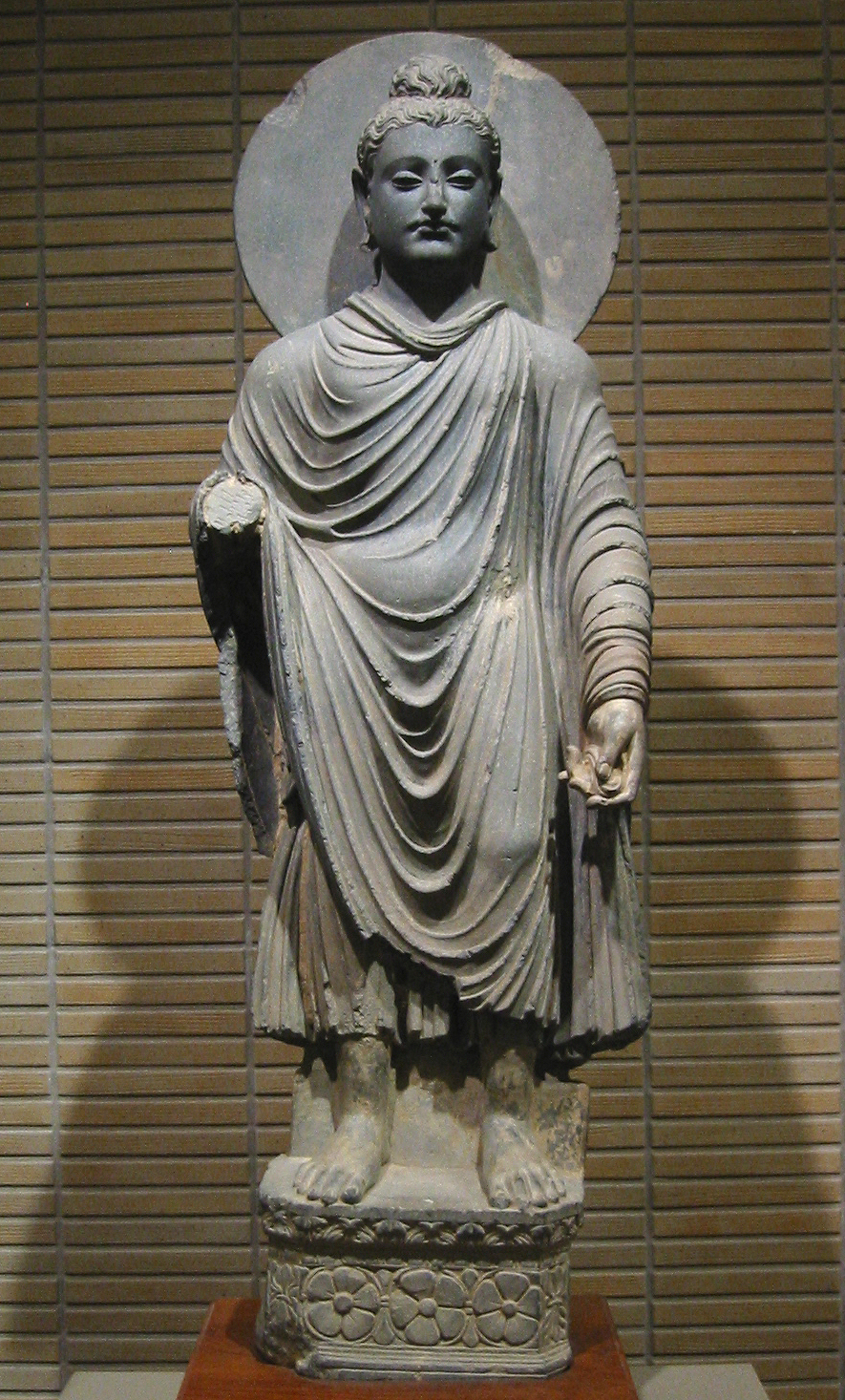
One of the first known representations of the Buddha, Gandhara, in pure Hellenistic style and technique: Standing Buddha (Tokyo National Museum). Height: about 1 meter.

The Indo-Greek may have initiated anthropomorphic representations of the Buddha in statuary, possibly as soon as the 2nd-1st century BCE, according to Foucher and others. Stupa constructions of the time of Menander, such as the Butkara stupa, incorporated niches which were intended to place statue or friezes, an indication of early Buddhist descriptive art during the time of the Indo-Greeks. Also Chinese murals are known which describe Emperor Wu of Han worshipping Buddha statues brought from Central Asia in 120 BCE.

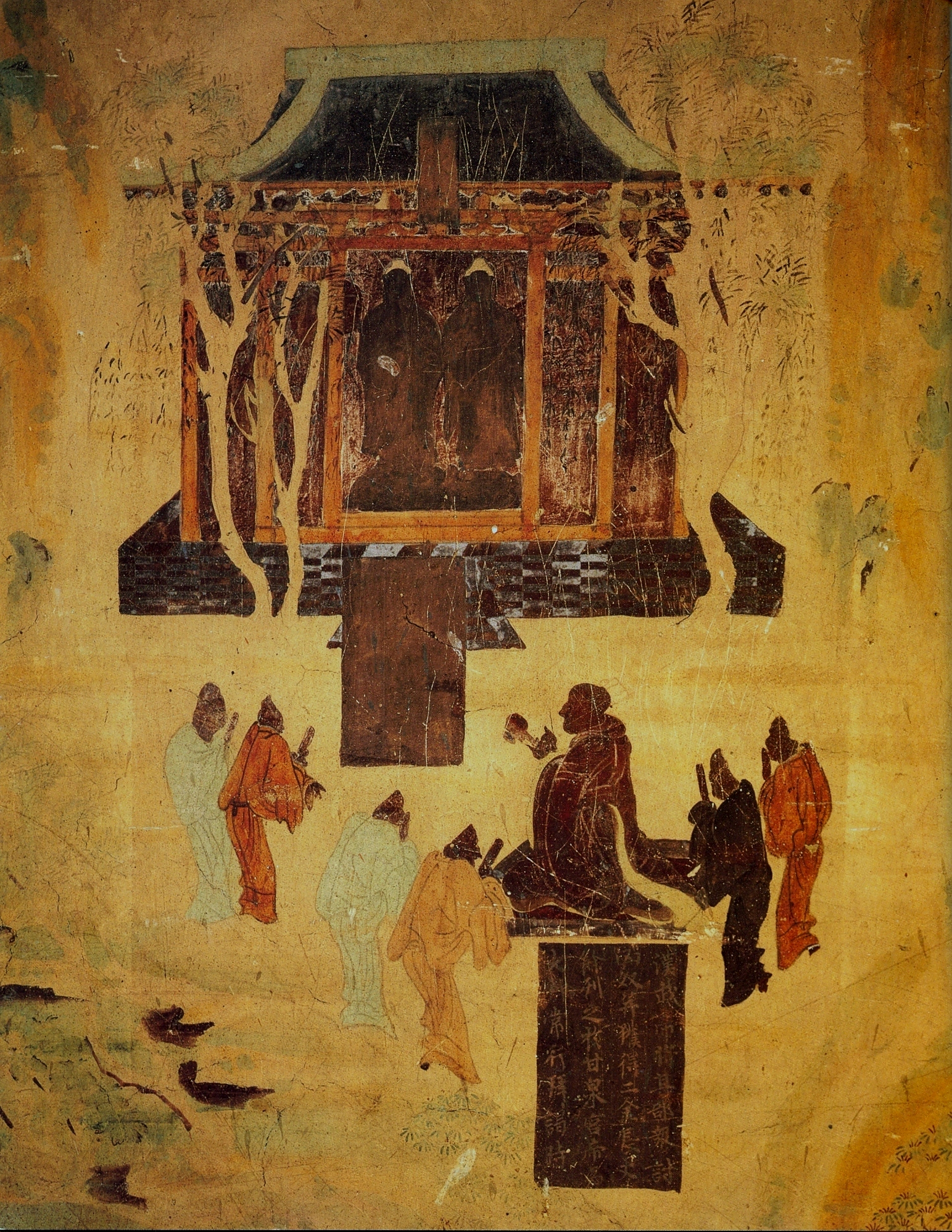
A Chinese fresco in the Mogao Caves indicates that gilded statues of the Buddha were brought to China from Central Asia in 120 BCE.

Foucher especially considered Hellenistic free-standing Buddhas as "the most beautiful, and probably the most ancient of the Buddhas", assigning them to the 2nd to 1st century BCE during the reign of Menander, and making them the starting point of the anthropomorphic representations of the Buddha:

"Never, in truth, were the circumstances more favourable than during [Menander's] reign (between 150 and 100 B.C.) for planting the germ of the whole subsequent development of Greco-Buddhist art by the creation of the Indo-Greek type of Buddha."

— "The beginnings of Buddhist Art", Alfred Foucher, p127.

The willingness of ancient Greeks to represent and worship local deities is also attested in Egypt with the creation of the god Serapis in Hellenistic style, an adaptation of the Egyptian god Apis, or in Phrygia with the Hellenistic representation of the heretofore aniconic Cybele. On the contrary, Indian Buddhist art was traditionally aniconic (the Buddha was only represented with symbols), and the Iranian tradition (represented by the 1st century Indo-Parthians) also did not represent their deities in human form. An Indo-Chinese tradition also explains that Nagasena, also known as Menander's Buddhist teacher, created in 43 BCE in the city of Pataliputra a statue of the Buddha, which is believed to be the Emerald Buddha, that is currently housed in Thailand.

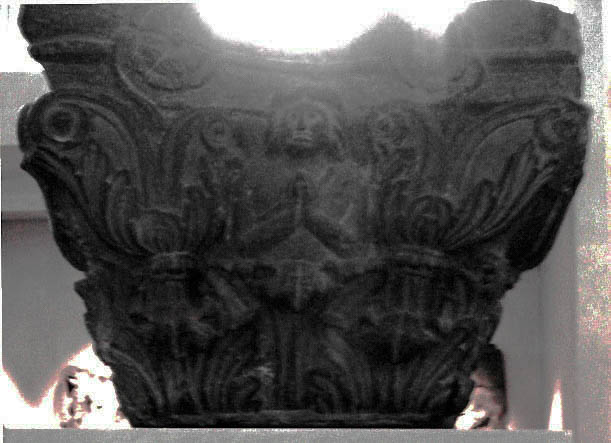
An Indo-Corinthian capital from the Butkara Stupa, representing a Buddhist devotee within foliage, dated to 20 BCE (Turin City Museum of Ancient Art).

Stylistically, Indo-Greek coins generally display a very high level of Hellenistic artistic realism, which declined drastically around 50 BCE with the invasions of the Indo-Scythians, Yuezhi and Indo-Parthians. The first known statues of the Buddha are also very realistic and Hellenistic in style and are more consistent with the pre-50 BCE artistic level seen on coins. This would tend to suggest that the first statues were created between 130 BCE (death of Menander) and 50 BCE, precisely at the time when Buddhist symbolism appeared on Indo-Greek coinage. From that time, Menander and his successors may have been the key propagators of Buddhist ideas and representations: "the spread of Gandhari Buddhism may have been stimulated by Menander's royal patronage, as may have the development and spread of Gandharan sculpture, which seems to have accompanied it" (Mc Evilly, "The shape of ancient thought", p378)

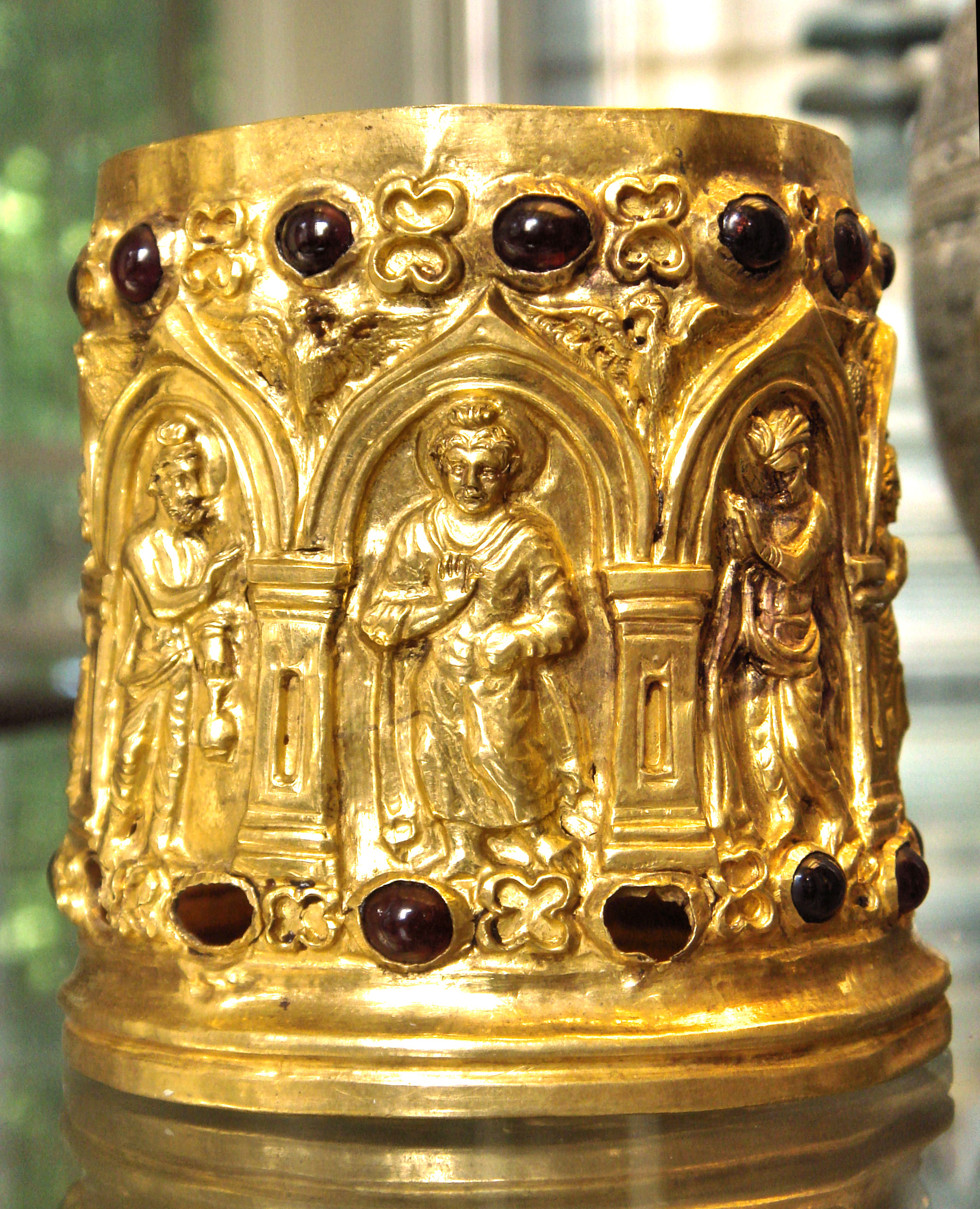
The Bimaran casket, representing the Buddha may be Indo-Greek work from around 30-10 BCE. British Museum.

The representation of the Buddha may also be connected to his progressive deification, which is usually associated with the spread of the Indian principle of Bhakti (personal devotion to a deity). Bhakti is a principle which evolved in the Bhagavata religious movement, and is said to have permeated Buddhism from about 100 BCE, and to have been a contributing factor to the representation of the Buddha in human form. The association of the Indo-Greeks with the Bhagavata movement is documented in the inscription of the Heliodorus pillar, made during the reign of the Indo-Greek king Antialcidas (r.c. 115-95 BCE). At that time relations with the Shungas seem to have improved, and some level of religious exchange seems to have occurred. The point of time when Bhakti fervour would have encountered the Hellenistic artistic tradition would then be around 100 BCE.

Most of the early images of the Buddha (especially those of the standing Buddha) are anepigraphic, which makes it difficult to have a definite datation. The earliest known image of the Buddha with approximate indications on date is the Bimaran casket, which has been found buried with coins of the Indo-Scythian king Azes II (or possibly Azes I), indicating a 30-10 BCE date, although this date is not undisputed. Such datation, as well as the general Hellenistic style and attitude of the Buddha on the Bimaran casket (Hellenistic treatment of the dress, contrapposto attitude) would make it a possible Indo-Greek work, used in dedications by Indo-Scythians right after the end of Indo-Greek rule in the area of Gandhara. Since it already displays quite a sophisticated iconography (Brahma and Śakra as attendants, Bodhisattvas) in an advanced style, it would suggest much earlier representations of the Buddha were already current by that time, going back to the rule of the Indo-Greeks (Alfred A. Foucher and others):

"It seems highly probable to me that the unknown artist who created the initial model [for the Buddha] was a Yavana, both artist and philosopher, who belonged both to Greece and India."

— Mario Bussagli, "L'art du Gandhara", p378 (French edition)

==== The question of coinage ====
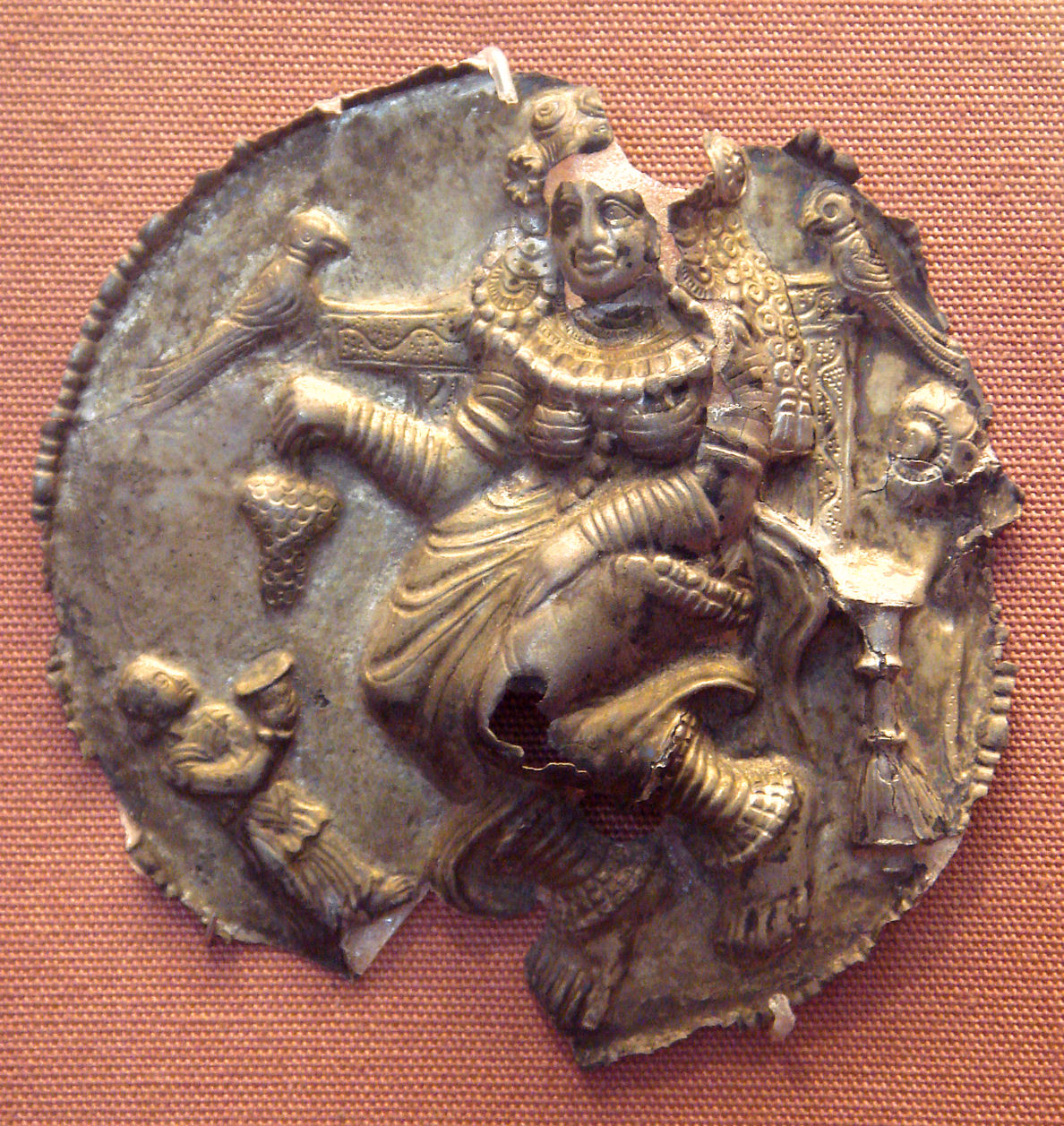
Devotee in Greek fashion, wearing a chiton, with the Buddhist goddess Hariti. Punjab, 2nd century BCE-2nd century CE. British Museum.

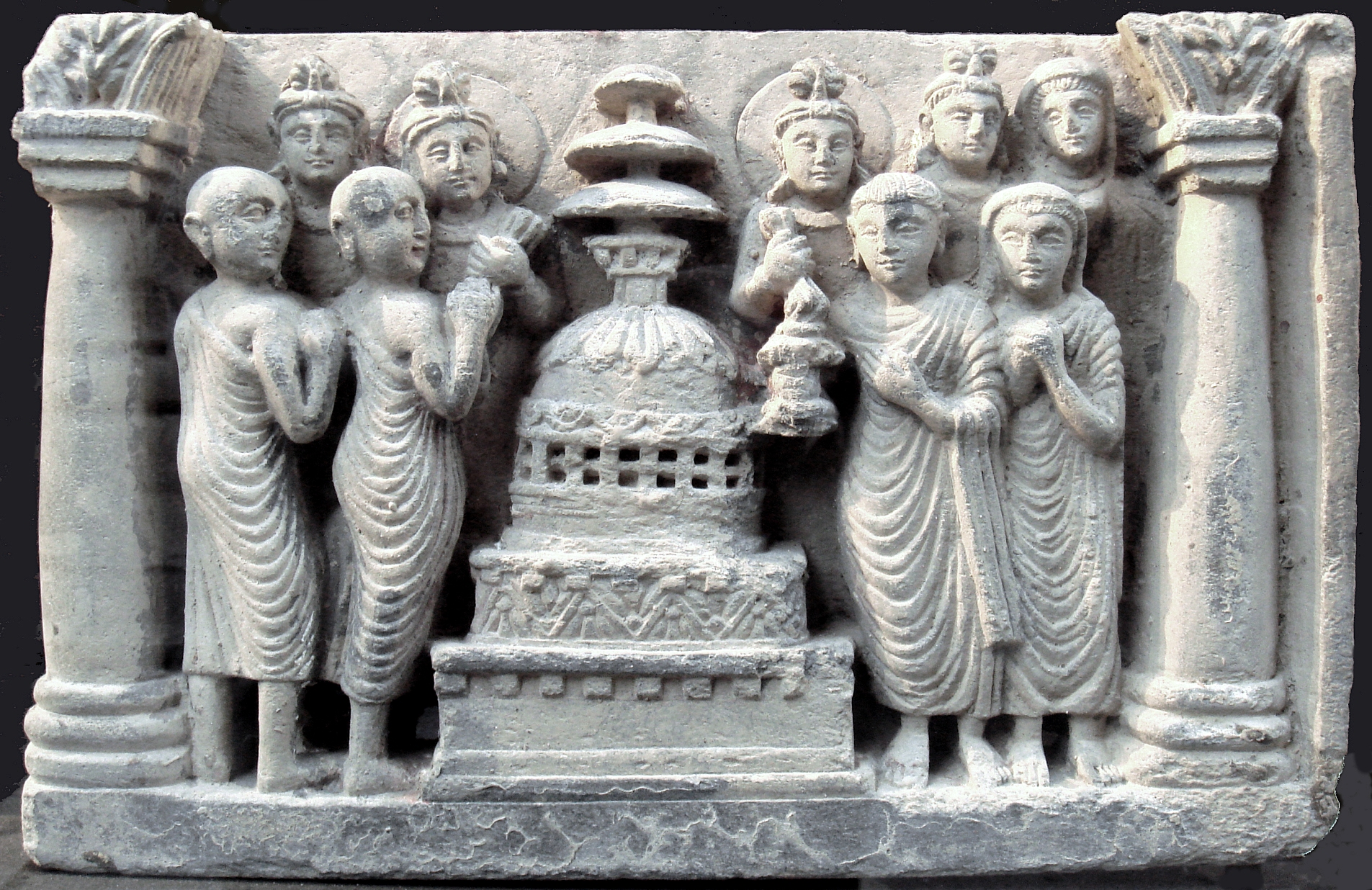
Devotee circambulating a Stupa.

The anthropomorphic representation of the Buddha is totally absent from Indo-Greek coinage. This could suggest that the Indo-Greek kings respected the Indian aniconic rule for Buddhist depictions, limiting themselves to Buddhist symbolism only (the dharma wheel, the seated lion). According to this perspective, the actual depiction of the Buddha would be a later phenomenon, usually dated to the 1st century CE, emerging from the sponsorship of the Indo-Scythians, Indo-Parthians and Kushans and executed by Greek, and, later, Indian and possibly Roman artists. Datation of Greco-Buddhist statues is generally uncertain, but they are at least firmly established from the 1st century CE.

Another possibility is that the Indo-Greeks may not have considered the Buddha strictly as a God, but rather as an essentially human sage or philosopher, in line with the traditional Nikaya Buddhist doctrine. Just as philosophers were routinely represented in statues (but certainly not on coins) in Antiquity, the image of the Buddha would naturally have occurred on statuary only.

Lastly, the Indo-Greeks did at the beginning represent Indian (Hindu) deities on their coins (coins of Agathocles c. 180 BCE), but this happened only once, and the experiment was never repeated again by any king. Although they are known to have been sympathetic to Indian religions in general, the Indo-Greeks apparently chose, for whatever reason, not to represent Indian deities on their coinage anymore.

== Hinduism ==
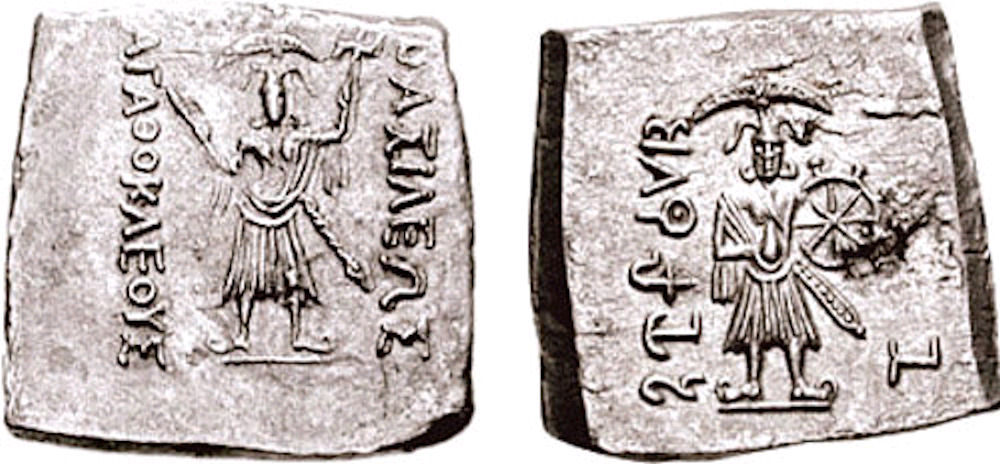
Coin of Agathocles with Hindu deities: Balarama-Samkarshana (left) and Vasudeva-Krishna (right).

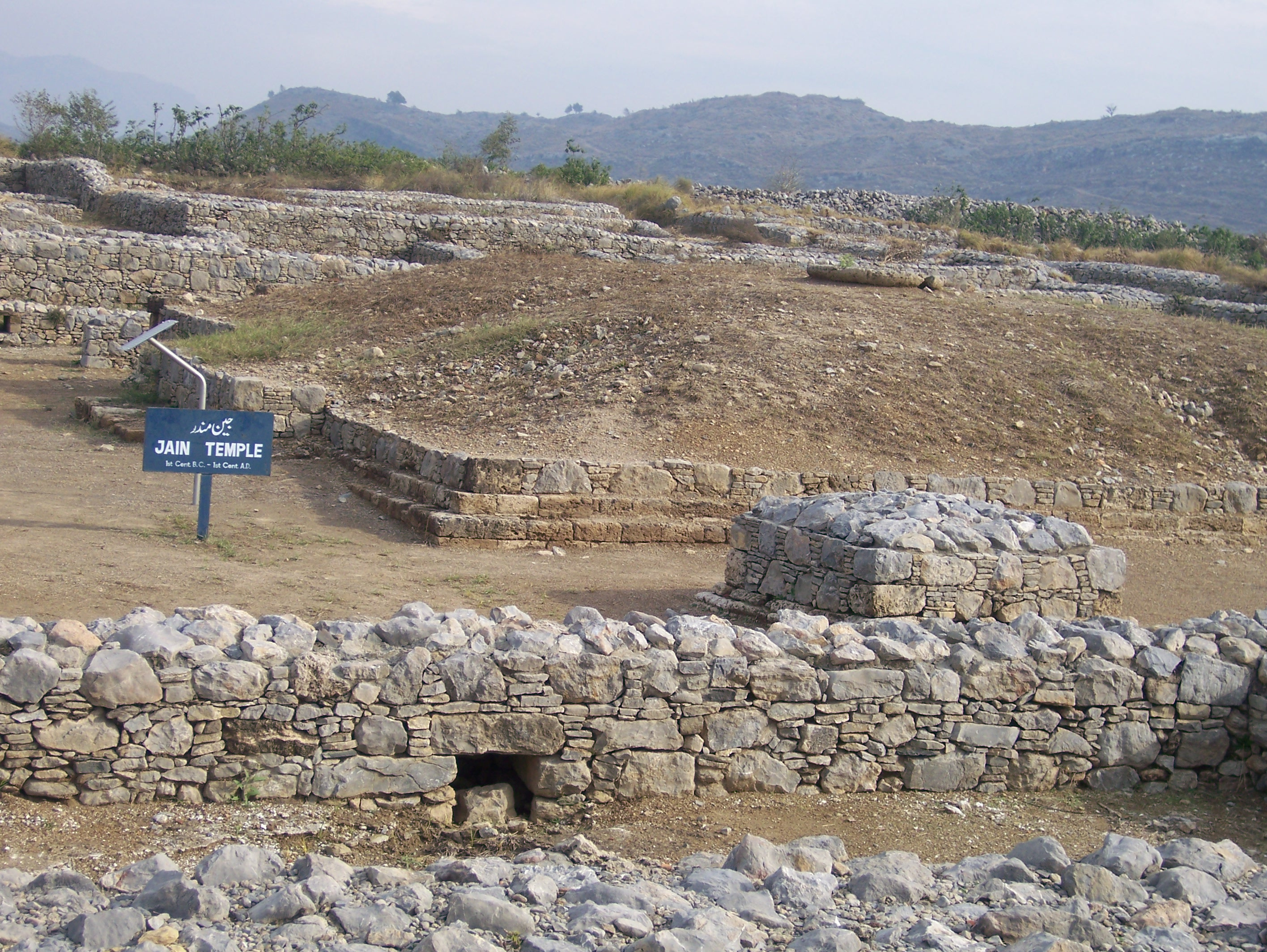
A Jain Temple at Sirkap, part of the Indo-Greek Kingdom, near modern-day Taxila, Punjab, Pakistan

The first known bilingual coins of the Indo-Greeks were issued by Agathocles around 180 BCE. These coins were found in Ai-Khanoum, the great Greco-Bactrian city in northeastern Afghanistan, but introduce for the first time an Indian script (the Brahmi script which had been in use under the Mauryan empire). The coinage depict various Indian iconography: Krishna-Vasudeva, with his large wheel with six spokes (chakra) and conch (shanka), and his brother Sankarshan-Balarama, with his plough (hala) and pestle (masala), both early avatars of Vishnu. The square coins, instead of the usual Greek round coins, also followed the Indian standard for coinage. The dancing girls on some of the coins of Agathocles and Pantaleon are also sometimes considered as representations of Subhadra, Krishna's sister.

These first issues were in several respects a short-lived experiment. Hindu anthropomorphic deities were never again represented in Indo-Greek coinage (although the bull on the vast quantity of subsequent coins may have symbolized Shiva, as the elephant may have symbolized Buddhism. Alternatively the bull, according to Foucher, represents the birth of the Buddha, which happened during the month of Vaicakha (April–May), known to Buddhists as Vesak, under the zodiacal sign of the Taurus, during the full moon), and the Brahmi script was immediately replaced by the Kharoshti script, derived from Aramaic. The general practice however of minting bilingual coins and combining Greek and Indian iconography, sometimes in the Greek and sometimes in the Indian standard continued for the next two centuries.

In any case, these coins suggest the strong presence of Indian religious traditions in the northwestern Indian subcontinent at that time, and the willingness of the Greeks to acknowledge and even promote them. Artistically, they tend to indicate that the Greeks were not particularly reluctant to make representations of local deities, which has some bearing on the later emergence of the image of the Buddha in Hellenistic style.

The Heliodorus pillar inscription is another epigraphical evidence of the interaction between Greeks and Hinduism. The pillar was erected around 110 BCE in central India at the site of Vidisha, by Heliodorus, a Greek ambassador of the Indo-Greek king Antialcidas to the court of the Shunga king Bhagabhadra. The pillar was surmounted by a sculpture of Garuda and was apparently dedicated by Heliodorus to the temple of Vasudeva.

"This Garuda-standard of Vasudeva (Vishnu), the God of Gods
was erected here by the Bhagavata Heliodoros,
the son of Dion, a man of Taxila,
sent by the Great Greek (Yona) King
Antialkidas, as ambassador to
King Kasiputra Bhagabhadra, the Savior
son of the princess from Benares, in the fourteenth year of his reign."
(Heliodorus pillar inscription)

== Zoroastrianism ==
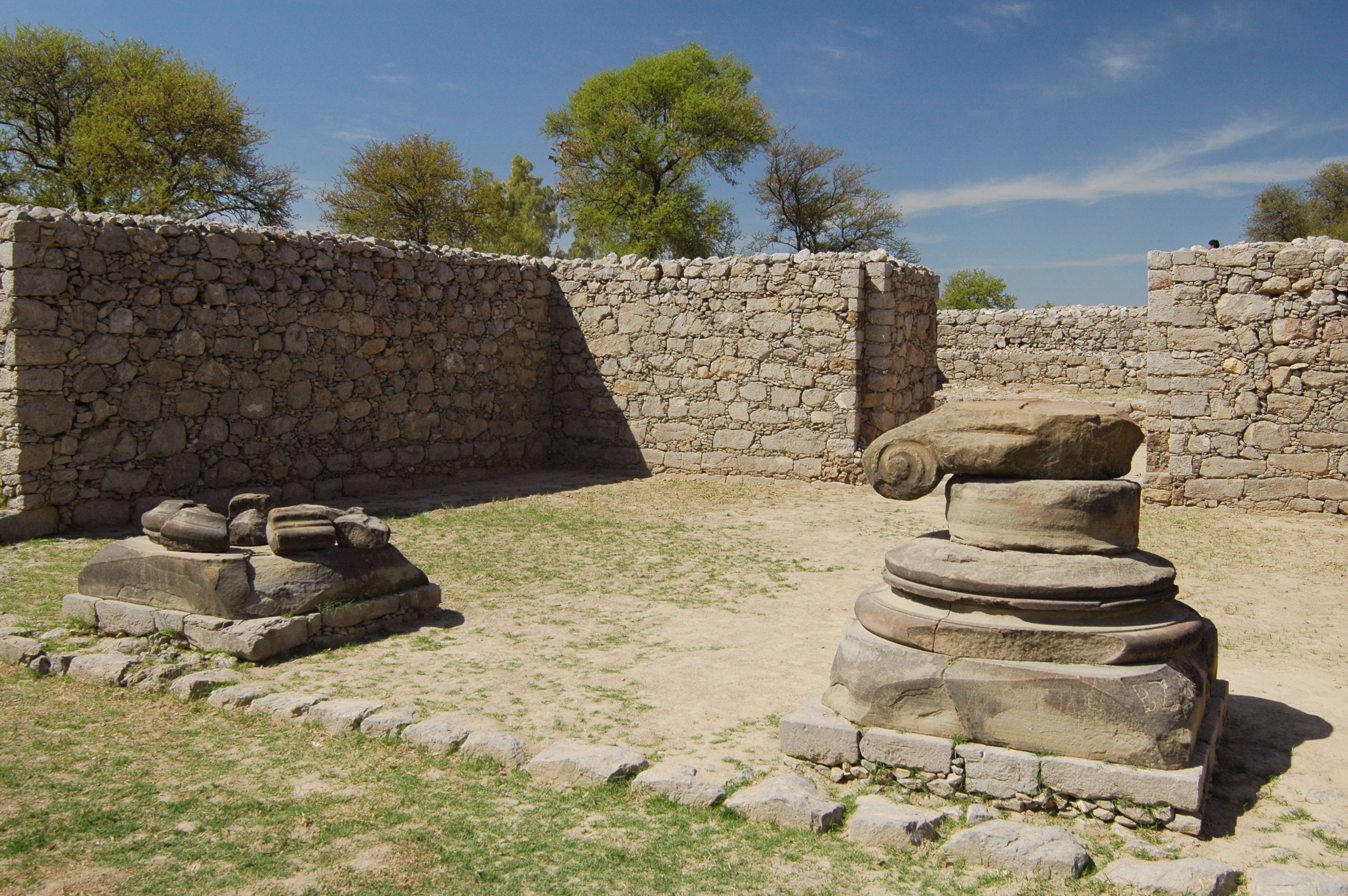
Hellenistic temple with Ionic columns at Jandial near Sirkap, Taxila. This temple is usually considered to have been a Zoroastriasm temple.

Greater Iranian culture and religion seem to have been rather influential among the Western Indo-Greeks, who, located around the Paropamisadae, lived in direct contact with the Central Asian cultural sphere and the eastern reaches of the Parthian empire. Images of the Zoroastrian divinity Mithra – depicted with a radiated Phrygian cap – appear extensively on the Indo-Greek coinage of the Western kings.

This Zeus-Mithra is also the one represented seated (with the gloriole around the head, and a small protrusion on the top of the head representing the cap) on many coins of Hermaeus, Antialcidas or Heliokles II, or possibly even earlier during the time of Eucratides I, on whose coins the figure is identified as the patron divinity of the city of Kapisa.

The future Buddha Maitreya, usually represented seated on a throne in the Western style, and venerated both in Mahayana and non-Mahayana Buddhism, is sometimes considered as influenced by Mithra. "Some scholars suggest he (Maitreya) was originally linked to the Iranian saviour-figure Mitra, and that his later importance for Buddhist as the future Buddha residing in the Tusita heaven, who will follow on from Sakyamuni Buddha, derives from this source."

== Notes ==
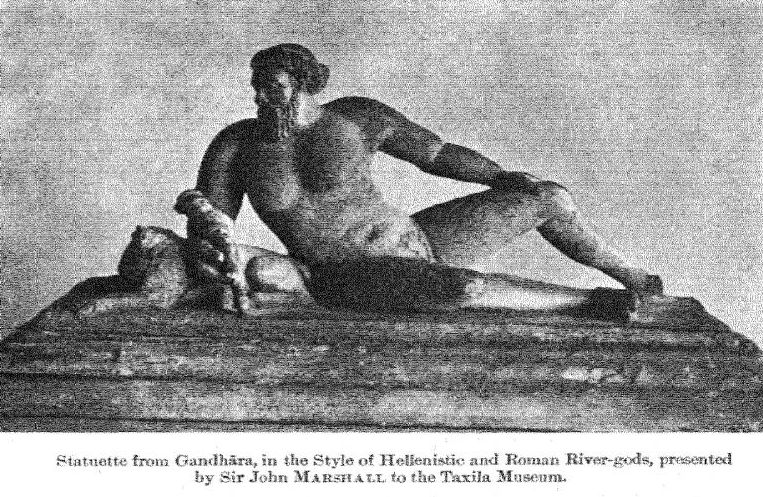
Gandhara river god statuette.
