= Bhagavan =

Epithet for god, lord, blessed one in Hinduism and Buddhism

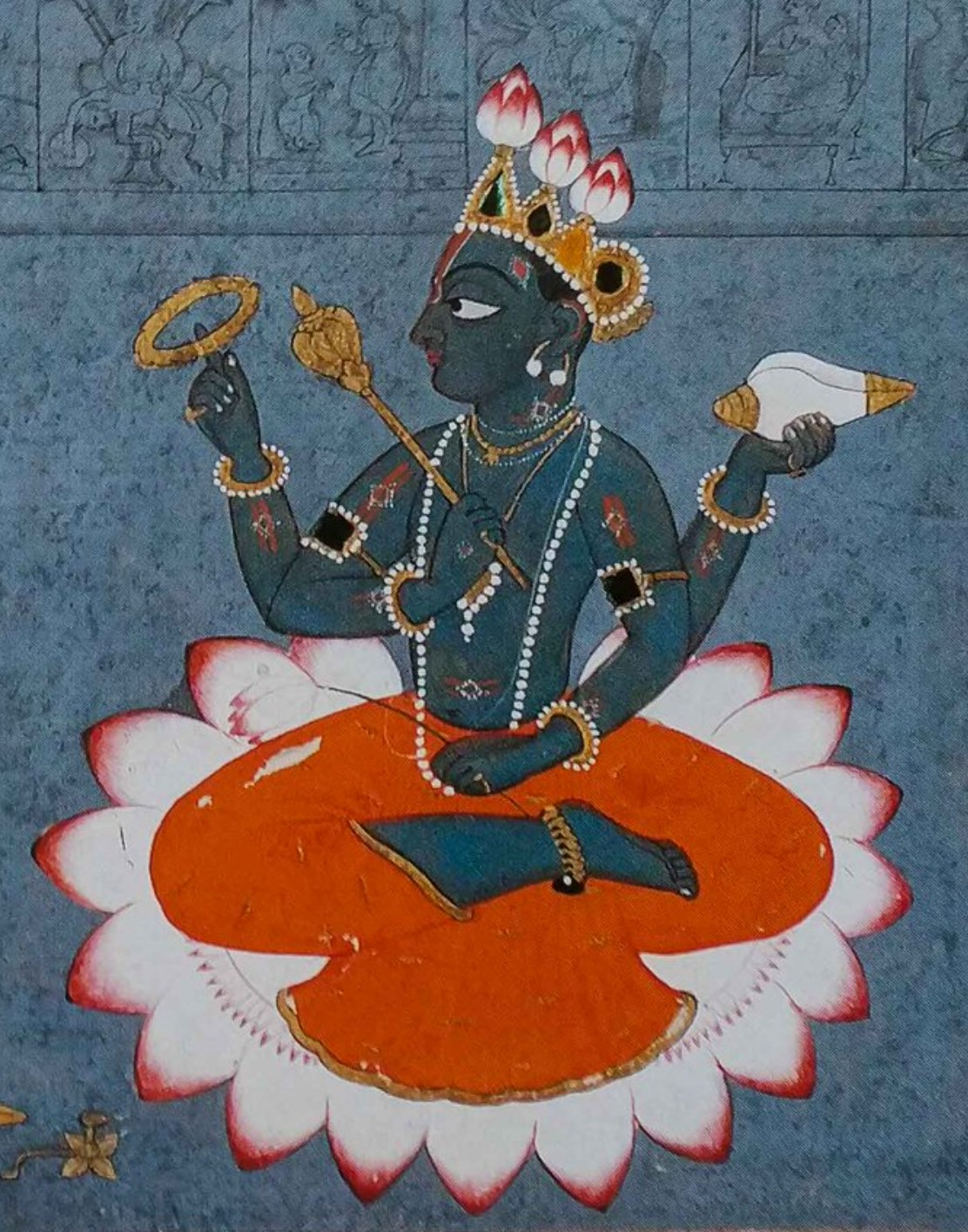
Painting depicting Vishnu, Bhagavan in Vaishnavism

The word Bhagavan (Sanskrit: भगवान्, romanized: Bhagavān; Pali: Bhagavā), also spelt as Bhagwan (sometimes translated in English as "Lord", "God"), is an epithet within Indian religions used to denote figures of religious worship. In Hinduism it is used to signify a deity or an avatar, particularly for Krishna and Vishnu in Vaishnavism, Shiva in Shaivism and Durga or Adi Shakti in Shaktism. In Jainism the term refers to the Tirthankaras, and in Buddhism to the Buddha.

In many parts of India and South Asia, Bhagavan represents the concept of a universal God or Divine to Hindus who are spiritual and religious but do not worship a specific deity.

In bhakti school literature, the term is typically used for any deity to whom prayers are offered. A particular deity is often the devotee's one and only Bhagavan. The female equivalent of Bhagavān is Bhagavatī. To some Hindus, the word Bhagavan is an abstract, genderless concept of God.

In Buddhism's Pali and Sanskrit scriptures, the term is used to denote The Buddha, referring him as Bhagavā or Bhagavān (translated with the phrase "Lord" or "The Blessed One"). The term Bhagavan is also found in Theravada, Mahayana and Tantra Buddhist texts.

== Etymology and meaning ==
Bhagavān, nominative singular of the adjective Bhagavat, literally means "fortunate", "blessed" (from the noun bhaga, meaning "fortune", "wealth"), and hence "illustrious", "divine", "venerable", "holy", etc. Bhagavān is related to the root Bhaj (भज्, "to revere", "adore"), and implies someone "glorious", "illustrious", "revered", "venerable", "divine", "holy" (an epithet applied to gods, holy or respectable personages). The root Bhaj also means "share with", "partake of", "aportion". Clooney and Stewart state that this root, in Vaishnava traditions, implies Bhagavān as one perfect creator that a devotee seeks to partake from, share his place with, by living in god, in the way of god, the loving participation between the two being its own reward.

The Vishnu Purana defines Bhagavān as follows,

उत्पत्तिं प्रलयं चैव भूतानामागतिं गतिम् |
वेत्तिं विद्यामविद्यां च स वाच्यो भगवानिति ||
He who understands the creation and dissolution, the appearance and disappearance of beings, the wisdom and ignorance, should be called Bhagavān.

— Vishnu Purana, VI.5.78

The same text defines Bhaga and provides the etymological roots as follows as translated by Wilson,

Knowledge is of two kinds, that which is derived from scripture, and that which is derived from reflection. Brahma that is the word is composed of scripture; Brahma that is supreme is produced of reflection. Ignorance is utter darkness, in which knowledge, obtained through any sense (as that of hearing), shines like a lamp; but the knowledge that is derived from reflection breaks upon the obscurity like the sun. (...) That which is imperceptible, undecaying, inconceivable, unborn, inexhaustible, indescribable; which has neither form, nor hands, nor feet; which is almighty, omnipresent, eternal; the cause of all things, and without cause; permeating all, itself unpenetrated, and from which all things proceed; that is the object which the wise behold, that is Brahma, that is the supreme state, that is the subject of contemplation to those who desire liberation, that is the thing spoken of by the Vedas, the infinitely subtle, supreme condition of Vishnu.

That essence of the supreme is defined by the term Bhagavat. The word Bhagavat is the denomination of that primeval and eternal God: and he who fully understands the meaning of that expression is possessed of holy wisdom, the sum, and substance of the Vedas. The word Bhagavat is a convenient form to be used in the adoration of that supreme being, to whom no term is applicable; and therefore Bhagavat expresses that supreme spirit, which is individual, almighty, and the cause of causes of all things. The letter Bh implies the cherisher and supporter of the universe. By ga is understood the leader, impeller, or creator. The disyllable Bhaga indicates the six properties, dominion, might, glory, splendor, wisdom, and dispassion. The purport of the letter va is that elemental spirit in which all beings exist, and which exists in all beings. And thus this great word Bhagavan is the name of Vásudeva, who is one with the supreme Brahma, and of no one else. This word, therefore, which is the general denomination of an adorable object, is not used in reference to the supreme in a general, but a special signification. When applied to any other (thing or person) it is used in its customary or general import. In the latter case, it may purport one who knows the origin and end and revolutions of beings, and what is wisdom, what ignorance. In the former, it denotes wisdom, energy, power, dominion, might, glory, without end, and without defect.

— Vishnu Purana, VI.5

Buddha is referred to as Bhagavan in ancient and medieval Theravada, Mahayana and Tantra Buddhist texts, where it connotes, "Lord", "Blessed One", "Fortunate One".

== Hinduism ==
=== Literature ===
The Vedic texts neither mention nor provide a basis to explain the origin of the Bhagavān concept.

Upanishads

The root of "Bhagavan", "Bhaga" is mentioned in the Mundaka Upanishad, but it does not mean or imply "Bhagavan"':

शौनको ह वै महाशालोऽङ्गिरसं विधिवदुपसन्नः पप्रच्छ ।

कस्मिन्नु भगवो विज्ञाते सर्वमिदं विज्ञातं भवतीति ॥ ३ ॥

Shaunaka asked: Can knowledge of the world's reality be so complete that all the many things we see are understood in it?

Can something so complete, excellent be found that knowing it, one knows everything?

— Mundaka Upanishad, I.1.3

The Mundaka Upanishad then answers this question in two parts over verses 1.1.4 through 3.2.11. These verses split knowledge into two sections: lower knowledge and higher knowledge. Lower knowledge includes Vedas, phonetics, grammar, etymology, meter, astronomy and ceremony rituals. The higher knowledge indicates, the Upanishad asserts, is Self-knowledge and realizing its oneness with Brahman—the one which cannot be seen, nor seized, which has no origin, no qualities, no hips, nor ears, no hands, nor feet, one that is the eternal, all-pervading, infinitesimal, imperishable.

The term Bhagavān appears in Shvetashvatara Upanishad verse 5.4:

सर्वा दिश ऊर्ध्वमधश्च तिर्यक्प्रकाशयन्भ्राजते यद्वनड्वान् ।

एवं स देवो भगवान्वरेण्यो योनिस्वभावानधितिष्ठत्येक: ॥

As the draft-ox shines, lighting up all the quarters, above, below, and across, so this God, blessed and adorable, alone rules over wombs and inherent natures.

— Shvetashvatara Upanishad, 5.4

Later and medieval era Upanishads mention Bhagavān. For example, the very first verse of the Kali-Saṇṭāraṇa Upaniṣhad uses the term, as follows,

द्वापरान्ते नारदो ब्रह्माणं जगाम कथं भगवन् गां पर्यटन् कलिं सन्तरेयमिति

At the end of the Dvapara [Yuga] Narada went to Brahma and asked, "O Lord, how shall I, roaming over the earth, be able to overcome the effects of Kali [Yuga]?"

— Kali-Saṇṭāraṇa Upaniṣad, 1.1

Kali-Saṇṭāraṇa, a minor Upanishad, then proceeds to disclose, among other things, two Bhagavan names in the Hare Krishna mantra in verse 2. This verse is sung by International Society for Krishna Consciousness (ISKCON) devotees.

Purana

In Bhagavata Dharma, it denotes Narayana Vasudeva's four vyuha formations. Ishvara or God is called Bhagavan and the person dedicated to Bhagavan is called a Bhagavata. The Bhagavata Purana (I.iii.28) identifies Krishna as Narayana, Vāsudeva, Vishnu and Hari—Bhagavan present in human form. Bhagavan is the complete revelation of the Divine; Brahman, the impersonal Absolute, is unqualified and therefore, never expressed. Paramatman is Bhagavan in relation to Prakṛti and the Jiva. The Yoga of Devotion implies that if a Bhagavata, the devotee of Bhagavan, seeks and longs for Bhagavan, then Bhagavan too seeks his devotee in equal measure.

Bhagavad Gita

The term Bhagavan appears extensively in the Bhagavad Gita, as Krishna counsels Arjuna. For example,

श्रीभगवानुवाच। कुतस्त्वा कश्मलमिदं विषमे समुपस्थितम्। अनार्यजुष्टमस्वर्ग्यमकीर्तिकरमर्जुन॥ २-२॥

Shri Bhagavan said, "from where had this weakness arisen, at this inconvenient time?
It is not noble, neither will it lead you to heaven, nor will it earn you valor, O Arjuna.

— Bhagavad Gita, 2.2

=== Vaishnavism ===
The Bhagavata tradition of Hinduism invoke Bhagavan in the Bhagavad Gita and the Bhishma Parva of the Mahabharata. The devotion to Vishnu (identified as Vasudeva in the Mahabharata) is elaborated to mean the ten incarnations of the deity. This tradition introduced the chaturvyuha concept and laid emphasis on the worship of the five Vrishni warriors, which reached the peak of its popularity during the Gupta Period.

=== Significance ===
In Hinduism, the word, Bhagavān, indicates the Supreme Being or Absolute Truth conceived as a Personal God. This personal feature indicated by the word Bhagavān differentiates its usage from other similar terms such as Brahman, the "Supreme Spirit" or "spirit", and thus, in this usage, Bhagavan is analogous to the Christian concept of God the Father. In Vaisnavism, a devotee of Bhagvān Krishna is called a Bhāgavata.

The Bhagavata Purana (1.2.11) states the definition of Bhagavān to mean the supreme being:

The Learned Know the Absolute Truth call this non-dual substance Brahman, Paramatma or Bhagavan. (Note: vadanti tat tattva-vidas/ tattvam yaj jnanam advayam/ brahmeti paramatmeti/ bhagavan iti sabdyate)

Bhagavān used as a title of veneration is often directly used as Lord, as in Bhagavān Rama, Bhagavān Krishna, Bhagavān Shiva, etc. In Buddhism and Jainism, Gautama Buddha, Mahavira and other Tirthankaras, Buddhas and bodhisattvas are also venerated with this title. The feminine of Bhagavat is Bhagawatī and is an epithet of Durga and other goddesses. This title is also used by a number of contemporary spiritual teachers in India who claim to be Bhagavan or have realized impersonal Brahman. The use of term bhagavān also permeates into certain worldly titles such as Seri Begawan (Malay: سري بڬاوان) historically granted to living kings abdicating to their princes in Malay kingdoms; the most recent and famous use is by Omar Ali Saifuddien III of Brunei namesake of its capital Bandar Seri Begawan.

Bhakti (devotion to God) consists of actions performed in dedication to the Paramatman, the individuated existence with free-will, and who is the final cause of the world; the Vedic Rishis describe the goals originating from God as Bhagavān, and the Ananda aspect of God where God has manifested His personality is called Bhagavān when consciousness (pure self-awareness) aligns with those goals to cause the unified existence and commencement of works follow.

== Buddhism ==
=== Literature ===
Bhagavān in Buddhist texts

==== In Pali Literature ====
Bhagava is the Pali word used for Bhagavan. Some Buddhist texts, such as the Pali suttas, use the word Bhagavā for the Buddha, meaning "the fortunate one". The term Bhagavā has been used in Pali Anussati or recollections as one of the terms that describes the "Tathāgata" as one full of good qualities, as arahant, sammā-sambuddho and sugato (Dīgha Nikāya II.93).

Bhagavan is one of the nine qualities of the Buddha. In the Buddha Anussati, Bhagavan is defined the following way:

Iti pi so Bhagavā Arahaṃ Sammā-sambuddho Vijjā-caraṇa sampanno Sugato Lokavidū Anuttaro purisa-damma-sārathi Satthā deva-manusānaṃ Buddho Bhagavāti

Thus is the Buddha, deserving homage, perfectly awakened, perfect in true knowledge and conduct, well gone to Nibbana, knower of the worlds, incomparable leader (lit. charioteer) of persons to be tamed, teacher of gods and humans, awakened one and Blessed One.

==== In Sanskrit Literature ====
Several Tibetan Buddhist tantra texts use the word Bhagavān. For example, the Pradipoddyotana manuscript of Guhyasamāja tantra-Samdhivyakarana uses the word Bhagavān, which Alex Wayman translates as "Lord". The text, elsewhere refers to "Bhagavan Sarvatathagatakayavakcittadipatih", which John Campbell translates as "Lord, Master of the Vajras of Body, Speech, and Mind of all Buddhas." Elsewhere, it states,

Thereupon, having made offerings and bowing down to the Bhagavan,
The Lord of Body Speech and Mind of all Tathagatas,
All the Bhagavan Tathagatas spoke thus:
Glorious One, pray to explain the essence,
The unexcelled Bodhicitta,
The secret of all Tathagatas,
The supreme of Body Speech and Mind.

— Pradipoddyotana, II. 1

The Laṅkāvatāra Sūtra, a sutra of Mahāyāna Buddhism, uses the word Bhagavān over three hundred times. Scholars either leave the term untranslated or render it as "Lord" or "Blessed One." The devotional text Sukhavati Vyuhopadesa by Vasubandhu uses the term Bhagavān in its invocations.

==== Variants ====
Other variants of the term Bhagavan, such as Bhagavant and Bhagavata can also be found throughout Buddhist texts. For instance, it is used in the initial chant, which is recited before almost every Sutta chanting,

NamoTassa Bhagavato Arahato Samma-sambuddhassa
I honour to that Bhagavan, who is Arhat and a fully-enlightened Buddha

=== Significance ===
The term Bhagavān is found in liturgical practices of Theravada Buddhism, where it is used as an epithet that means the "Blessed One". Examples of such usage is found in Sri Lanka's Bodhi Puja (or Atavisi Buddha Puja, Worship of the Twenty Eight Buddhas).

The word Bhagavan is the most common word for the Buddhist texts to refer to the Buddha. For example, almost every sutra in Buddhist canonical and commentarial texts starts with the line like

Evaṃ me suttaṃ – ekaṃ samayaṃ bhagavā sāvatthiyaṃ viharati jetavane anāthapiṇḍikassa ārāme. (Pali)

evaṃ mayā śrutam | ekasmin samaye bhagavān śrāvastyāṃ viharati sma jetavane'nāthapiṇḍadasyārāme. (Sanskrit)

Thus have I heard - Once the Bhagavan was dwelling in Savatthi, at the Anathpindaka's monastery in Jetavana. (English Translation)

== Inscriptions ==
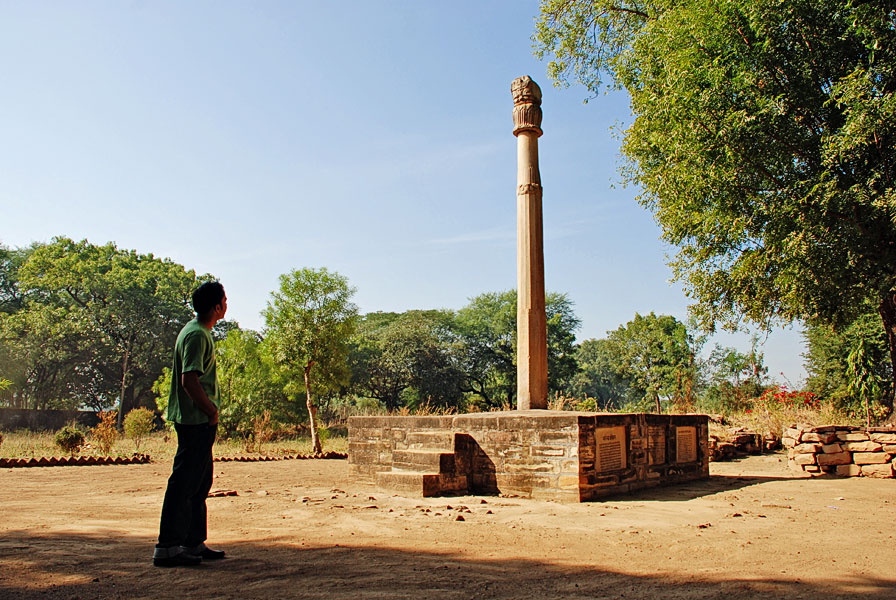
Heliodorus Khamba (pillar) in the Indian state of Madhya Pradesh. Installed about 100 BCE, the pillar's Brahmi-script inscription states that Heliodorus is a Bhagvatena (devotee) of Vishnu.

=== Greek ===
A word derived from Bhagavan is documented epigraphically from around 100 BCE, such as in the inscriptions of the Heliodorus pillar; in which Heliodorus, an Indo-Greek ambassador from Taxila to the court of a Shunga king, addresses himself as a Bhagvatena (devotee) of Vishnu. ("Heliodorena Bhagavata", Archaeological Survey of India, Annual Report (1908-1909)):

This Garuda-standard of Vasudeva (Vishnu), the God of Gods was erected here by the Bhagavatena (devotee) Heliodoros, the son of Dion, a man of Taxila, sent by the Great Greek (Yona) King Antialcidas, as ambassador to King Kasiputra Bhagabhadra, the Savior son of the princess from Benares, in the fourteenth year of his reign." (Note: Original inscription: Devadevasa Va [sude]vasa Garudadhvajo ayam karito i[a] Heliodorena bhaga- vatena Diyasa putrena Takhasilakena Yonadatena agatena maharajasa Amtalikitasa upa[m]ta samkasam-rano Kasiput[r]asa [Bh]agabhadrasa tratarasa vasena [chatu]dasena rajena vadhamanasa")

=== Buddhist vase ===
Sākamunisa bhagavato is recorded in the kharoshthi dedication of a vase placed in a Buddhist stupa by the Greek meridarch (civil governor of a province) named Theodorus:

"Theudorena meridarkhena pratithavida time sarira sakamunisa bhagavato bahu-Jana-stitiye":
"The meridarch Theodorus has enshrined relics of Lord Shakyamuni, for the welfare of the mass of the people"
– (Swāt relic vase inscription of the Meridarkh Theodoros)

=== Brass pillars and stupas ===
James Prinsep identified several engravings and inscriptions on ancient Buddhist artifacts that include the word Bhagavan and related words. For example,

Bhagawana-sarirahi Sri Tabachitrasa Khamaspada putrasa dana.
"(Casket) containing relics of Bhagwan, the gift of Sri Tabachitra, the son of Khamaspada
– The Tope of Manikyala

== See also ==
- Brahma
- Vishnu
- Shiva
- Purusha
- Brahman
- Acintya
- Bhagavad Gita
- Bhakti
- Ishvara
- Jnana
- Lord
- Narayana
- Om Tat Sat
- Para Brahman
- Svayam Bhagavan
- Turiya
- Yoga

== Sources ==
- Thomas Mcevilley (2002). The Shape of Ancient Thought: Comparative Studies in Greek and Indian Philosophies. Skyhorse Publishing Inc. ISBN 978-1-58115-203-6.
- Baij Nath Puri (1987). Buddhism In Central Asia. Motilal Banarsidass Pub. ISBN 978-81-208-0372-5.
