= Diomedes Soter =

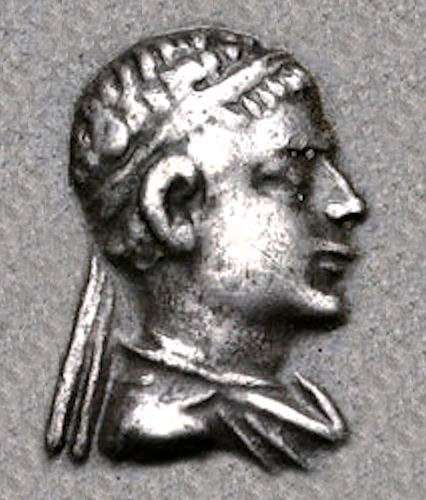
- Portrait of King Diomedes

Indo-Greek king
- Reign: 95–90 BC

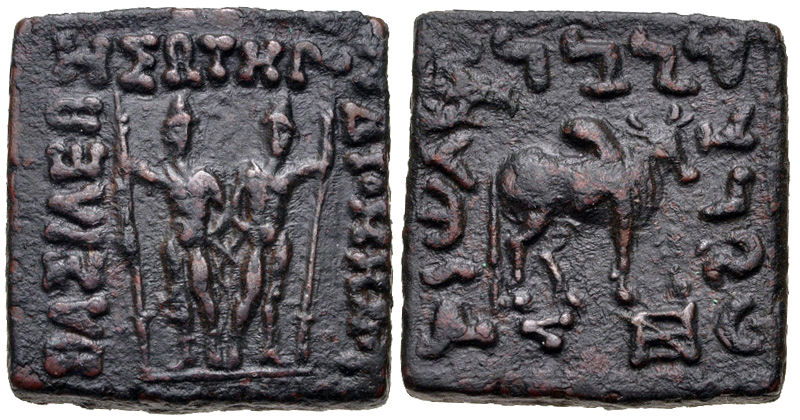
Indian standard coin of Diomedes Soter.

Diomedes Soter (Greek: Διομήδης Σωτήρ, Diomḗdēs Sōtḗr, "Diomedes the Saviour") was an Indo-Greek king and possible claimant Greco-Bactrian king who may have attempted to reconquer the lands north of the Hindu Kush. He was likely a member of the Eucratid dynasty. The places where his coins have been found seem to indicate that his rule was based in the area of the Paropamisadae, possibly with temporary dominions further east. Judging from their similar portraits and many overlapping monograms, the young Diomedes seems to have been the heir (and probably a relative) of Philoxenus, the last king to rule before the kingdom of Menander I finally fragmented.

== Time of reign ==
Bopearachchi dates Diomedes to c. 95–90 BC and R. C. Senior dates him to c. 115–105 BC.

== Coins of Diomedes ==
Diomedes is depicted with the Dioscuri on his coins, either on horseback or standing; both types were previously used by Eucratides the Great, which suggests a dynastic link to the latter. It is however uncertain how the two were related, since Eucratides I died long before Diomedes. Very few Indo-Greek kings after Eucratides I minted silver coins showing the Dioscuri.

Diomedes also minted Attic-type coins (Greco-Bactrian style, with Greek legend only), which depict the king wearing a unique crested helmet, along with the Dioscuri riding horses on the reverse. His bilingual coins (with Greek and Kharoshthi) show the king either wearing the diadem alone or crested helmets. His coinage indicates that he was ruling in the western part of the Indo-Greek territory.

One overstrike is known, of a coin of Strato and Agathoclea over a coin of Diomedes. This overstrike could indicate that Diomedes fought over the central areas of the Indo-Greek territories with Strato and Agathoclea.

== Gallery ==
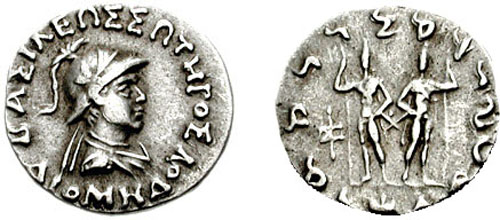
Silver coin of Diomedes. Obverse shows the King wearing a Boeotian helmet and royal diadem, with Greek legend: ΒΑΣΙΛΕΩΣ ΣΩΤΗΡΟΣ ΔΙΟΜΗΔΟΥ, Basileōs Sōtēros Diomēdou, "Of King Diomedes the Saviour". Reverse with standing Dioscuri, and the Kharoshti legend: Maharajasa Tratarasa Diyametasa, "Of the Great Saviour King Diomedes".

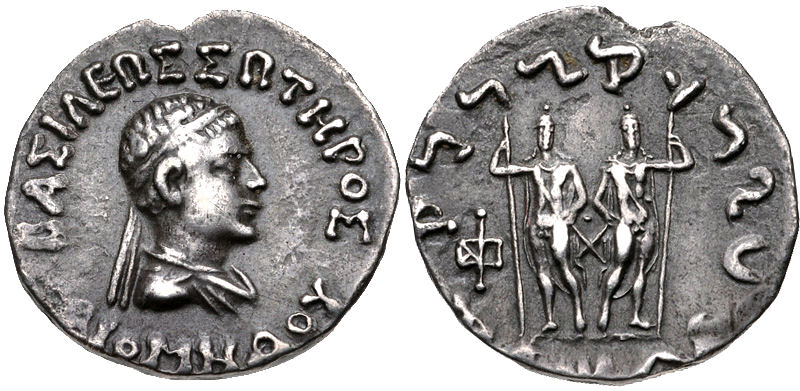
Silver coin of Diomedes. The obverse shows King bareheaded and wearing a diadem, with surrounding Greek legend. The reverse shows the Dioscuri standing, and with the Kharoshti legend on the outside.

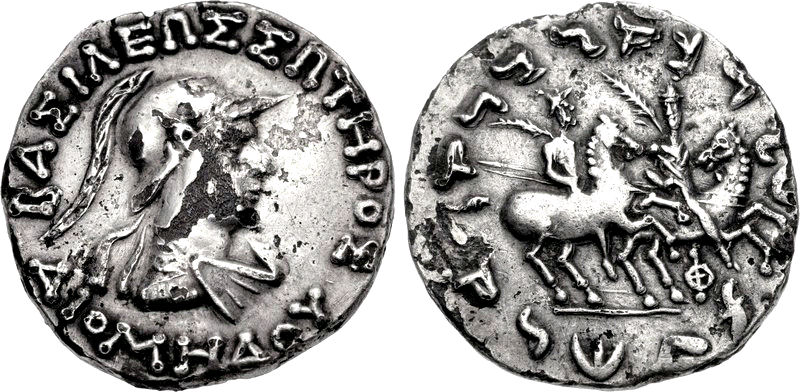
Another silver coin of Diomedes. The Obverse showing the King wearing a Boeotian helmet with a diadem, with the Greek legend on the outside. The reverse shows the Dioscuri riding horses, and the Kharoshti legend on the outside.

	Greco-Bactrian kings		Indo-Greek kings					
Territories/ dates	West Bactria	East Bactria	Paropamisade	Arachosia	Gandhara	Western Punjab	Eastern Punjab	Mathura
326-325 BCE	Campaigns of Alexander the Great in India						Nanda Empire	
312 BCE	Creation of the Seleucid Empire						Creation of the Maurya Empire	
305 BCE	Seleucid Empire after Mauryan war		Maurya Empire					
280 BCE	Foundation of Ai-Khanoum							
255–239 BCE	Independence of the Greco-Bactrian kingdom Diodotus I		Emperor Ashoka (268-232 BCE)					
239–223 BCE	Diodotus II							
230–200 BCE	Euthydemus I							
200–190 BCE	Demetrius I				Sunga Empire			
190-185 BCE	Euthydemus II							
190–180 BCE	Agathocles			Pantaleon				
185–170 BCE	Antimachus I							
180–160 BCE			Apollodotus I					
175–170 BCE	Demetrius II							
160–155 BCE			Antimachus II					
170–145 BCE	Eucratides I							
155–130 BCE	Yuezhi occupation, loss of Ai-Khanoum	Eucratides II; Plato; Heliocles I	Menander I					
130–120 BCE	Yuezhi occupation		Zoilus I		Agathoclea			Yavanarajya inscription
120–110 BCE			Lysias		Strato I			Yavanarajya inscription
110–100 BCE			Antialcidas		Heliocles II			Yavanarajya inscription
100 BCE			Polyxenus		Demetrius III			Yavanarajya inscription
100–95 BCE			Philoxenus					Yavanarajya inscription
95–90 BCE			Diomedes	Amyntas		Epander		Yavanarajya inscription
90 BCE			Theophilus	Peucolaus		Thraso		Yavanarajya inscription
90–85 BCE			Nicias	Menander II		Artemidorus		Yavanarajya inscription
90–70 BCE			Hermaeus	Archebius				Yavanarajya inscription
			Yuezhi occupation		Maues (Indo-Scythian)			
75–70 BCE				Vonones	Telephus	Apollodotus II		
65–55 BCE				Spalirises		Hippostratus	Dionysius	
55–35 BCE					Azes I (Indo-Scythians)		Zoilus II	
55–35 BCE					Vijayamitra/ Azilises		Apollophanes	
25 BCE – 10 CE				Gondophares	Zeionises	Kharahostes	Strato II; Strato III	
				Gondophares (Indo-Parthian)			Rajuvula (Indo-Scythian)	
			Kujula Kadphises (Kushan Empire)				Bhadayasa (Indo-Scythian)	Sodasa (Indo-Scythian)

== See also ==
- Greco-Bactrian Kingdom
- Greco-Buddhism
- Indo-Parthian Kingdom
- Indo-Scythians
- Kushan Empire
- Seleucid Empire

Preceded by Philoxenus	Indo-Greek ruler in Paropamisadae; 95–90 BC	Succeeded by Theophilos
