= Epander =

Epander Nikephoros
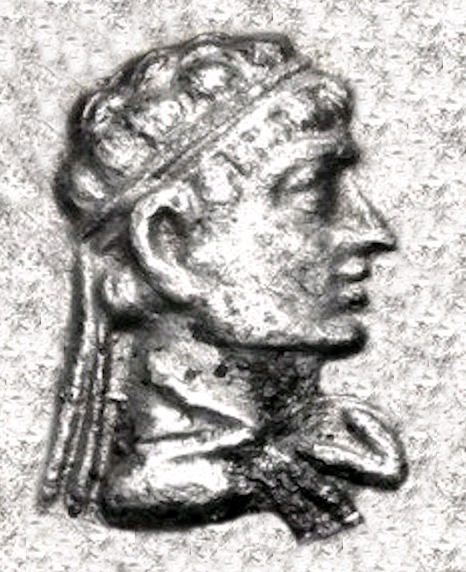
- Portrait of Epander

Indo-Greek king
- Reign: 95–90 BC

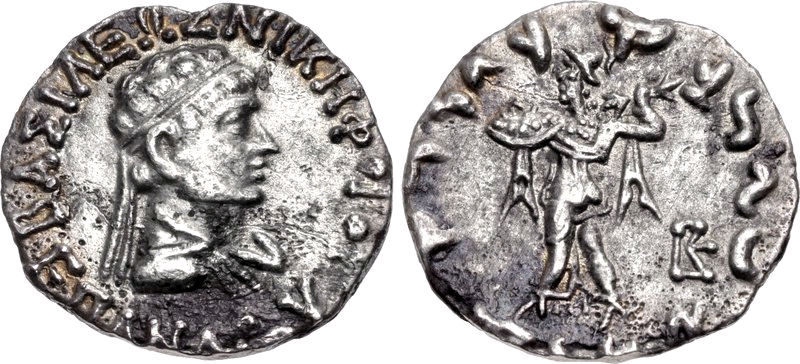
Coin of Epander. Greek legend: ΒΑΣΙΛΕΩΣ ΝΙΚΗΦΟΡΟΥ ΕΠΑΝΔΡΟΥ Basileos Nikephorou Epandrou, "Of the Victorious King Epander".

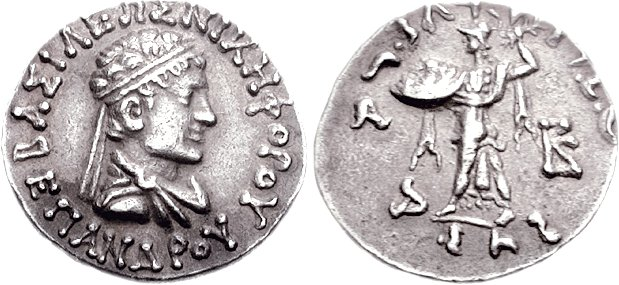
Coin of Epander. Greek legend: ΒΑΣΙΛΕΩΣ ΝΙΚΗΦΟΡΟΥ ΕΠΑΝΔΡΟΥ Basileos Nikephorou Epandrou, "Of the Victorious King Epander".

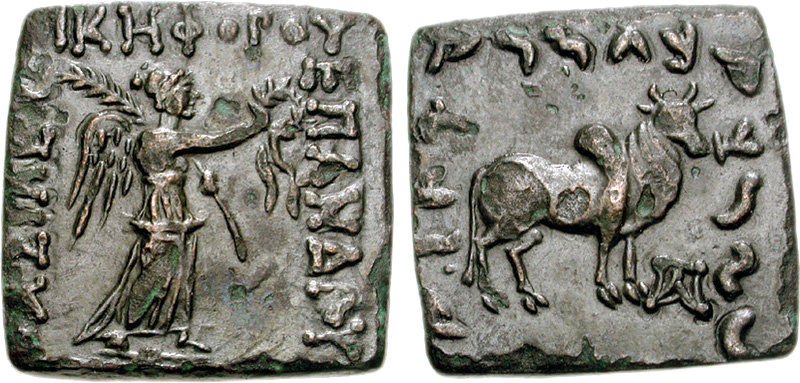
Indian-standard coin of Epander. Greek legend: ΒΑΣΙΛΕΩΣ ΝΙΚΗΦΟΡΟΥ ΕΠΑΝΔΡΟΥ Basileos Nikephorou Epandrou, "Of the Victorious King Epander".

Epander Nikephoros (Greek: Ἔπανδρος Épandros meaning "above man") was one of the Indo-Greek kings. He may have been a relative of Menander I, and the findplaces of his coins seem to indicate that he ruled in the area of Punjab.

== Time of reign ==
Bopearachchi dates Epander to c. 95–90 BC and R. C. Senior to c. 80 BC. The scarcity of his coins indicate that his reign was short and/or his territory limited.

== Coins of Epander ==
Epander's silver drachms portray the king in diadem with a reverse of Athena fighting which was the type of Menander I. Epander probably claimed ancestry from this important king, but his epithet Nikephoros (Victorious) was unique to kings using this reverse: their title was usually Soter (Saviour). He struck no Attic (monolingual) coins.

== Overstrikes ==
Epander overstruck coins of Strato I and Philoxenus.

	Greco-Bactrian kings		Indo-Greek kings					
Territories/ dates	West Bactria	East Bactria	Paropamisade	Arachosia	Gandhara	Western Punjab	Eastern Punjab	Mathura
326-325 BCE	Campaigns of Alexander the Great in India						Nanda Empire	
312 BCE	Creation of the Seleucid Empire						Creation of the Maurya Empire	
305 BCE	Seleucid Empire after Mauryan war		Maurya Empire					
280 BCE	Foundation of Ai-Khanoum							
255–239 BCE	Independence of the Greco-Bactrian kingdom Diodotus I		Emperor Ashoka (268-232 BCE)					
239–223 BCE	Diodotus II							
230–200 BCE	Euthydemus I							
200–190 BCE	Demetrius I				Sunga Empire			
190-185 BCE	Euthydemus II							
190–180 BCE	Agathocles			Pantaleon				
185–170 BCE	Antimachus I							
180–160 BCE			Apollodotus I					
175–170 BCE	Demetrius II							
160–155 BCE			Antimachus II					
170–145 BCE	Eucratides I							
155–130 BCE	Yuezhi occupation, loss of Ai-Khanoum	Eucratides II; Plato; Heliocles I	Menander I					
130–120 BCE	Yuezhi occupation		Zoilus I		Agathoclea			Yavanarajya inscription
120–110 BCE			Lysias		Strato I			Yavanarajya inscription
110–100 BCE			Antialcidas		Heliocles II			Yavanarajya inscription
100 BCE			Polyxenus		Demetrius III			Yavanarajya inscription
100–95 BCE			Philoxenus					Yavanarajya inscription
95–90 BCE			Diomedes	Amyntas		Epander		Yavanarajya inscription
90 BCE			Theophilus	Peucolaus		Thraso		Yavanarajya inscription
90–85 BCE			Nicias	Menander II		Artemidorus		Yavanarajya inscription
90–70 BCE			Hermaeus	Archebius				Yavanarajya inscription
			Yuezhi occupation		Maues (Indo-Scythian)			
75–70 BCE				Vonones	Telephus	Apollodotus II		
65–55 BCE				Spalirises		Hippostratus	Dionysius	
55–35 BCE					Azes I (Indo-Scythians)		Zoilus II	
55–35 BCE					Vijayamitra/ Azilises		Apollophanes	
25 BCE – 10 CE				Gondophares	Zeionises	Kharahostes	Strato II; Strato III	
				Gondophares (Indo-Parthian)			Rajuvula (Indo-Scythian)	
			Kujula Kadphises (Kushan Empire)				Bhadayasa (Indo-Scythian)	Sodasa (Indo-Scythian)

== See also ==
- Greco-Bactrian Kingdom
- Seleucid Empire
- Greco-Buddhism
- Indo-Scythians
- Indo-Parthian Kingdom
- Kushan Empire

Preceded by Philoxenus	Indo-Greek ruler in Punjab; 95–90 BCE	Succeeded by Apollodotus II
