= Theophilus (Indo-Greek) =

Theophilos
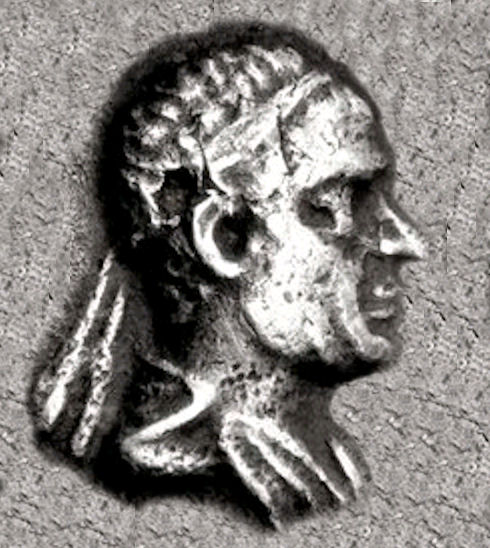
- Portrait of Theophilos

Indo-Greek king
- Reign: 130 BC or 90 BC

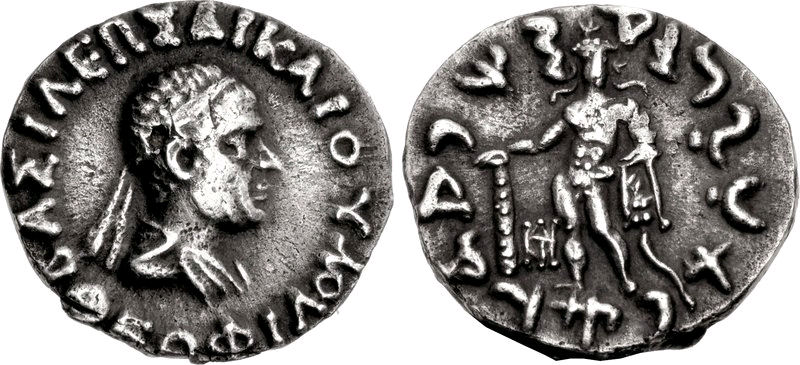
Coin of Theophilos. Obv: Bust of king Theophilus. Bead and reel contour. Greek Legend: ΒΑΣΙΛΕΩΣ ΔΙΚΑΙΟΥ ΘΕΟΦΙΛΟΥ "Of Fair/Just King Theophilos". Rev: Herakles.

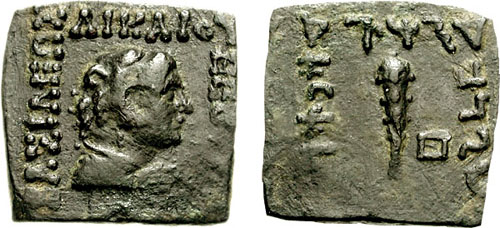
Indian-standard coin of Theophilus, with bust of Herakles, and his club on reverse.

Theophilus Dicaeus (Ancient Greek: Θεόφιλος Δίκαιος, romanized: Theophilos Dikaios) was a minor Indo-Greek king who ruled for a short time in the Paropamisadae. He was possibly a relative of Zoilus I and is only known from coins. It is possible that some of Theophilus' coins in fact belong to another ruler, in Greek Bactria, during approximately the same period.

== Time of reign ==
While Bopearachchi suggests c. 90 BC, R. C. Senior believes that Theophilus ruled in the 130s BC. Both numismatics do however suggest that the reigns of Theophilus and Nicias were adjacent.

== Coins of Theophilos ==
Just like Zoilus I, Theophilus struck Indian silver coins with Heracles, a common symbol of the house of Euthydemus I, and the epithet Dikaios/Dhramikasa "The Just/Follower of the Dharma". The monograms are mostly the same as those of Nicias. The bronzes have similar inscriptions.

Bronzes of Theophilos:

Heracles with lion skin, and his club on the reverse.

== A Bactrian king Theophilus? ==
There is a wholly different, and very rare, Attic-weight coinage of a king Theophilus. Found in Bactria, these coins feature a reverse with a seated Athena with Nike, a different title Autokrator "Autocrat King" (Ancient Greek: ΒΑΣΙΛΕΩΣ ΑΥΤΟΚΡΑΤΟΡΟΣ), and also a separate monogram. Although this is not a very common occurrence on Indo-Greek coins, the coins of Theophilus have generally been accepted as belonging to one unique king. Bopearachchi has supported this proposition by pointing at the similarity between the portraits and the identical treatment of the diadem (one end straight, one end crooked).

Against this, Jakobsson argues that the coins issued by the later Indo-Greek kings for export into Bactria were consistently similar to these kings' regular Indian coinage. Consequently, the coins of Theophilos Autokrator were not such export issues, but should belong to a Bactrian ruler. Jakobsson suggests that Theophilus Autocrator was a Bactrian princelet who briefly maintained himself in some part of Bactria, after the Hellenistic kingdom there had been vanquished by nomads, presumably in the 120s BC.

== See also ==
- Greco-Bactrian Kingdom
- Greco-Buddhism
- Indo-Scythians
- Indo-Parthian Kingdom
- Kushan Empire

== Notes ==
Preceded by Diomedes	Indo-Greek ruler in Paropamisadae c. 90 BC	Succeeded by Nicias

	Greco-Bactrian kings		Indo-Greek kings					
Territories/ dates	West Bactria	East Bactria	Paropamisade	Arachosia	Gandhara	Western Punjab	Eastern Punjab	Mathura
326-325 BCE	Campaigns of Alexander the Great in India						Nanda Empire	
312 BCE	Creation of the Seleucid Empire						Creation of the Maurya Empire	
305 BCE	Seleucid Empire after Mauryan war		Maurya Empire					
280 BCE	Foundation of Ai-Khanoum							
255–239 BCE	Independence of the Greco-Bactrian kingdom Diodotus I		Emperor Ashoka (268-232 BCE)					
239–223 BCE	Diodotus II							
230–200 BCE	Euthydemus I							
200–190 BCE	Demetrius I				Sunga Empire			
190-185 BCE	Euthydemus II							
190–180 BCE	Agathocles			Pantaleon				
185–170 BCE	Antimachus I							
180–160 BCE			Apollodotus I					
175–170 BCE	Demetrius II							
160–155 BCE			Antimachus II					
170–145 BCE	Eucratides I							
155–130 BCE	Yuezhi occupation, loss of Ai-Khanoum	Eucratides II; Plato; Heliocles I	Menander I					
130–120 BCE	Yuezhi occupation		Zoilus I		Agathoclea			Yavanarajya inscription
120–110 BCE			Lysias		Strato I			Yavanarajya inscription
110–100 BCE			Antialcidas		Heliocles II			Yavanarajya inscription
100 BCE			Polyxenus		Demetrius III			Yavanarajya inscription
100–95 BCE			Philoxenus					Yavanarajya inscription
95–90 BCE			Diomedes	Amyntas		Epander		Yavanarajya inscription
90 BCE			Theophilus	Peucolaus		Thraso		Yavanarajya inscription
90–85 BCE			Nicias	Menander II		Artemidorus		Yavanarajya inscription
90–70 BCE			Hermaeus	Archebius				Yavanarajya inscription
			Yuezhi occupation		Maues (Indo-Scythian)			
75–70 BCE				Vonones	Telephus	Apollodotus II		
65–55 BCE				Spalirises		Hippostratus	Dionysius	
55–35 BCE					Azes I (Indo-Scythians)		Zoilus II	
55–35 BCE					Vijayamitra/ Azilises		Apollophanes	
25 BCE – 10 CE				Gondophares	Zeionises	Kharahostes	Strato II; Strato III	
				Gondophares (Indo-Parthian)			Rajuvula (Indo-Scythian)	
			Kujula Kadphises (Kushan Empire)				Bhadayasa (Indo-Scythian)	Sodasa (Indo-Scythian)
