= Nicias (Indo-Greek king) =

2nd/1st century BC Indo-Greek king

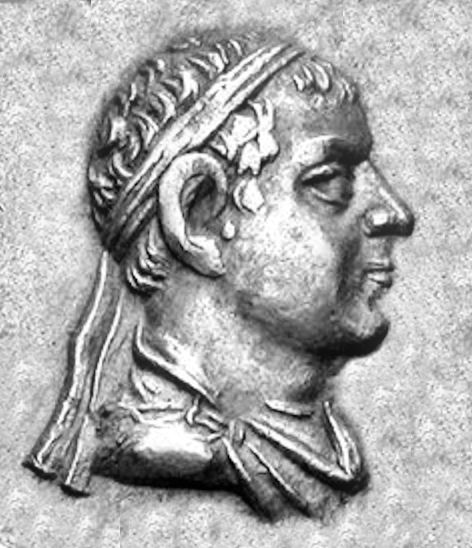
- Portrait of Nicias as a young king

Indo-Greek king
- Reign: 90–85 BC

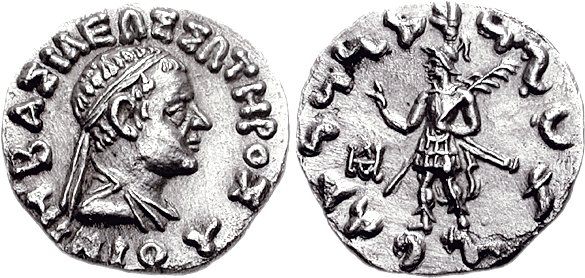
Coin of king Nicias (c. 90–85 BC) Obv: Bust of Nicias with Greek legend ΒΑΣΙΛΕΩΣ ΣΩΤΗΡΟΣ ΝΙΚΙΟΥ "Of Saviour King Nicias". Rev: King in armour, holding a palm of victory in his left hand, and making a gesture of benediction with his right hand, similar to the Buddhist vitarka mudra. Kharoshti legend MAHARAJA TRATARASA NIKIASA "Saviour King Nicias".

Nicias (Greek: Νικίας, Nikías; r. 90 – 85 BC) was an Indo-Greek king who ruled in the Paropamisade. Most of his relatively few coins have been found in northern Pakistan, indicating that he ruled a smaller principate around the lower Kabul valley. He was possibly a relative of Menander I.

== Time of reign ==
Bopearachchi suggests that Nicias ruled c. 90–85 BC. This late date is supported by the absence of Attic coins (see below).

R. C. Senior on the other hand places him as a successor of Menander, c. 135–125 BC, according to his interpretation of hoard findings.

Regardless of which period is correct, the fact that Nicias ages visibly on his coins seems to indicate some longevity to his rule.

== The coinage of Nicias ==
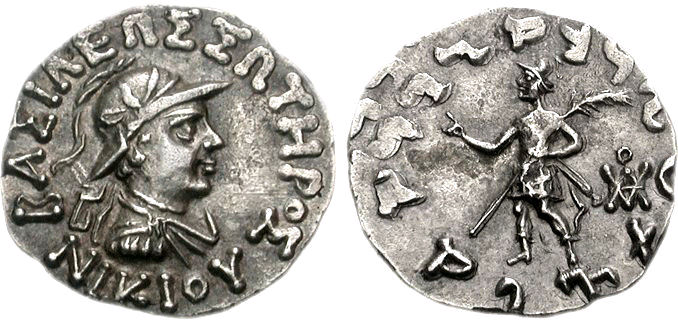
Coin of Nicias, with king wearing a Boeotian helmet and making a benediction gesture (obverse).

Nicias struck Indian silver drachms of diademed or helmeted king with three reverses:

- A standing king in armour making a blessing gesture, found on several drachms.
- An en face version of Menander's Athena with thunderbolt is found on a unique tetradrachm.
- The third reverse is the type king on a prancing horse, as used by Antimachus II found on a single drachm.

His bronzes feature Zeus/dolphin or portrait / king on prancing horse. Some varieties are crude with lunate sigmas and square omicrons. Even though Nikias ruled in the western parts of the Indo-Greek realm, no Attic coins have been found.

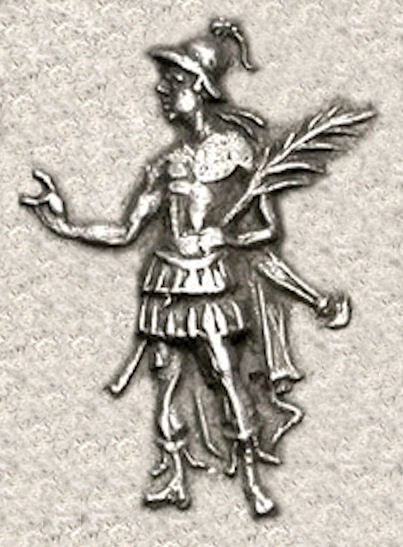
Nicias in Hellenistic uniform making a blessing gesture.

His monograms generally match those of the kings Theophilus and Philoxenus, though one is shared with Thraso, the short-lived son of Menander I.

== See also ==
- Greco-Bactrian Kingdom
- Seleucid Empire
- Greco-Buddhism
- Indo-Scythians
- Indo-Parthian Kingdom
- Kushan Empire

== Sources ==
- The Shape of Ancient Thought. Comparative studies in Greek and Indian Philosophies by Thomas McEvilley (Allworth Press and the School of Visual Arts, 2002) ISBN 1-58115-203-5
- The Greeks in Bactria and India, W.W. Tarn, Cambridge University Press.

Preceded by Theophilos	Indo-Greek ruler in Paropamisadae; 90–85 BC	Succeeded by Hermaeus

	Greco-Bactrian kings		Indo-Greek kings					
Territories/ dates	West Bactria	East Bactria	Paropamisade	Arachosia	Gandhara	Western Punjab	Eastern Punjab	Mathura
326-325 BCE	Campaigns of Alexander the Great in India						Nanda Empire	
312 BCE	Creation of the Seleucid Empire						Creation of the Maurya Empire	
305 BCE	Seleucid Empire after Mauryan war		Maurya Empire					
280 BCE	Foundation of Ai-Khanoum							
255–239 BCE	Independence of the Greco-Bactrian kingdom Diodotus I		Emperor Ashoka (268-232 BCE)					
239–223 BCE	Diodotus II							
230–200 BCE	Euthydemus I							
200–190 BCE	Demetrius I				Sunga Empire			
190-185 BCE	Euthydemus II							
190–180 BCE	Agathocles			Pantaleon				
185–170 BCE	Antimachus I							
180–160 BCE			Apollodotus I					
175–170 BCE	Demetrius II							
160–155 BCE			Antimachus II					
170–145 BCE	Eucratides I							
155–130 BCE	Yuezhi occupation, loss of Ai-Khanoum	Eucratides II; Plato; Heliocles I	Menander I					
130–120 BCE	Yuezhi occupation		Zoilus I		Agathoclea			Yavanarajya inscription
120–110 BCE			Lysias		Strato I			Yavanarajya inscription
110–100 BCE			Antialcidas		Heliocles II			Yavanarajya inscription
100 BCE			Polyxenus		Demetrius III			Yavanarajya inscription
100–95 BCE			Philoxenus					Yavanarajya inscription
95–90 BCE			Diomedes	Amyntas		Epander		Yavanarajya inscription
90 BCE			Theophilus	Peucolaus		Thraso		Yavanarajya inscription
90–85 BCE			Nicias	Menander II		Artemidorus		Yavanarajya inscription
90–70 BCE			Hermaeus	Archebius				Yavanarajya inscription
			Yuezhi occupation		Maues (Indo-Scythian)			
75–70 BCE				Vonones	Telephus	Apollodotus II		
65–55 BCE				Spalirises		Hippostratus	Dionysius	
55–35 BCE					Azes I (Indo-Scythians)		Zoilus II	
55–35 BCE					Vijayamitra/ Azilises		Apollophanes	
25 BCE – 10 CE				Gondophares	Zeionises	Kharahostes	Strato II; Strato III	
				Gondophares (Indo-Parthian)			Rajuvula (Indo-Scythian)	
			Kujula Kadphises (Kushan Empire)				Bhadayasa (Indo-Scythian)	Sodasa (Indo-Scythian)
