= Om Tat Sat =

Group of mantras

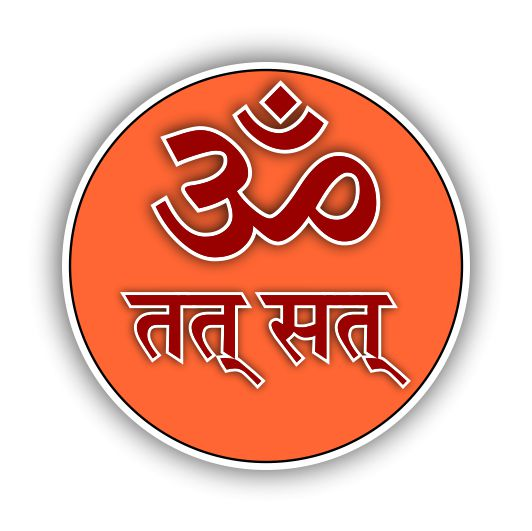
Om Tat Sat is a Hindu mantra.

Om Tat Sat (Sanskrit: ओम् तत् सत्, Om Tat Sat) is the group of three mantras in Sanskrit found in verse 17.23 of the Bhagavad Gita.

"Om Tat Sat" is the eternal sound-pranava. "Om Tat Sat" represents the unmanifest and absolute reality. The word "reality" here means total existence. God, reality, existence, Para Brahman and the Absolute, are all synonymous terms pointing to one Supreme Being.

In the seventeenth chapter of the Bhagavad Gita, from verses 23 to 28, Lord Krishna discussed the meaning and importance of the mantra Om Tat Sat. He said that Om Tat Sat is actually a threefold name of the Supreme Soul with which, at the start of the universe, the Brahmana, Vedas and Yajna were made.

The words “Om Tat Sat” have been declared as symbolic representations of the Supreme Absolute Truth, from the beginning of creation. From them came the priests, scriptures, and sacrifice. (17.23)

Therefore, when performing acts of sacrifice, offering charity, or undertaking penance, expounders of the Vedas always begin by uttering “Om” according to the prescriptions of Vedic injunctions. (17.24)

Persons who do not desire fruitive rewards, but seek to be free from material entanglements, utter the word “Tat” along with acts of austerity, sacrifice, and charity. (17.25)

The word “Sat” means eternal existence and goodness. O Arjun, it is also used to describe an auspicious action. Being established in the performance of sacrifice, penance, and charity, is also described by the word “Sat.” And so any act for such purposes is named “Sat.” (17.26-17.27)

O son of Pritha, whatever acts of sacrifice, charity, or penance are done without faith, are termed as “Asat.” They are useless both in this world and the next. (17.28)

== Om ==
Om is a symbolic representation of the impersonal aspect of God, the Supreme One. It refers to the formless Brahman and is the primordial sound that pervades creation.

== Tat ==
This word means everything belongs to God, and by keeping that in mind, the people seeking liberation selflessly do the yajna, tapas and dana without desire of any fruits of the actions.

== Sat ==
This word represents all the actions and duties which are performed with truthfulness and related to the eternal truth. It is also said the everything present in yajna, tapas and dana are considered as "Sat", as well as actions meant solely for the satisfaction of the Supreme.
