= Philoxenus Anicetus =

Philoxenus
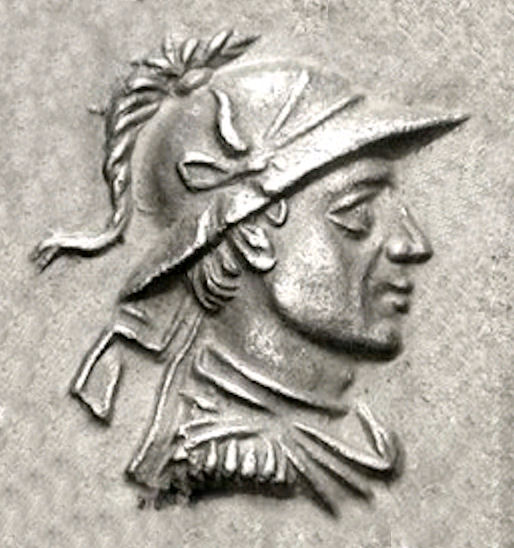
- Portrait of Philoxenus

Indo-Greek king
- Reign: 100–95 BC
- Died: Mathura

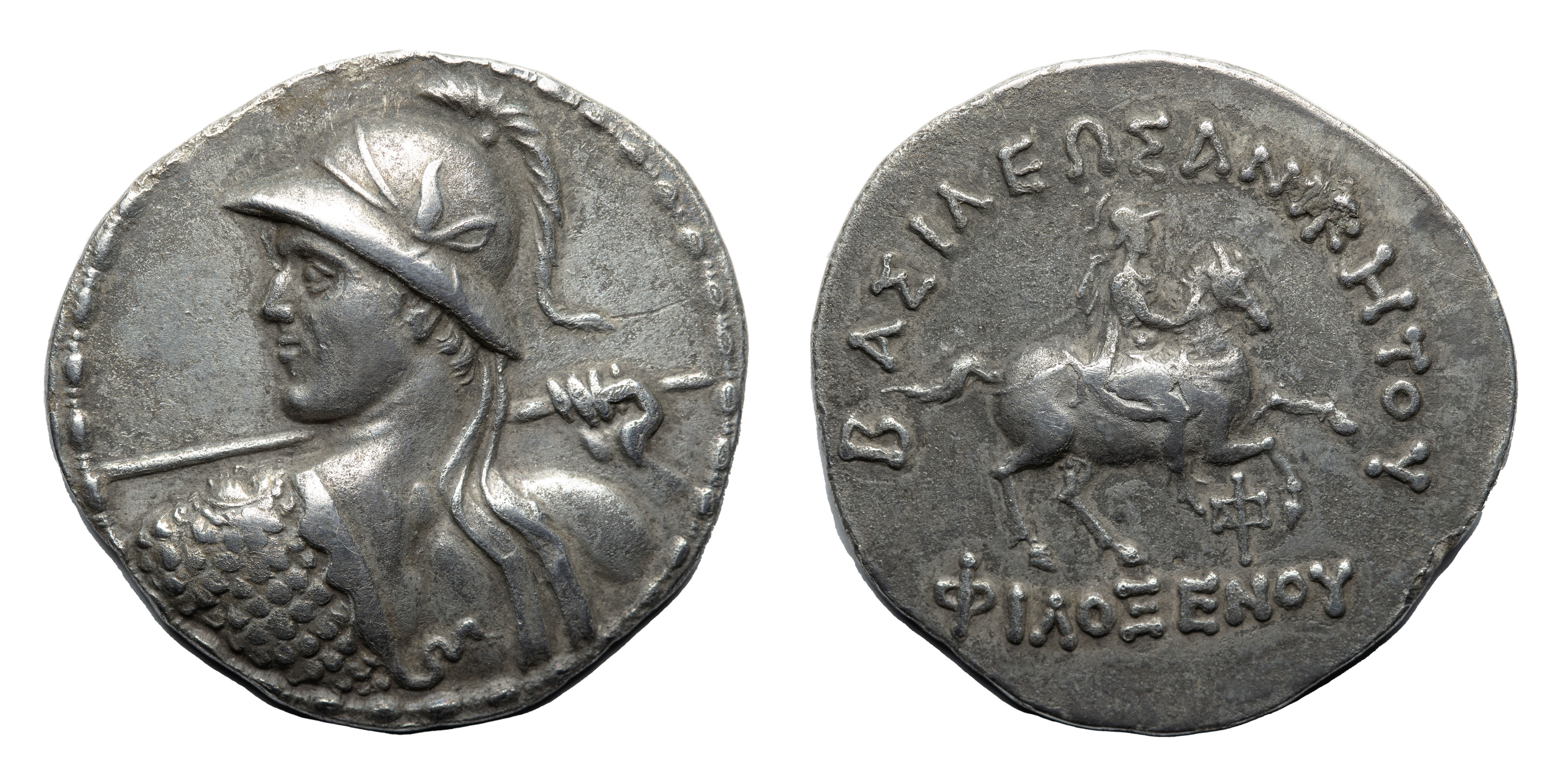
Silver coin of Philoxenus in the Attic standard. The obverse shows the king wearing a Boeotian helmet, diadem, and aegis, while holding a spear in hand. The reverse shows the king riding a horse, and Greek legend: ΒΑΣΙΛΕΩΣ ΑΝΙΚΗΤΟΥ ΦΙΛΟΞΕΝΟΥ, Basileōs Anikētou Philoxenou, "Of the Invincible King Philoxenus".

Philoxenus Anicetus (Greek: Φιλόξενος ὁ Ἀνίκητος, Philόxenos ho Aníkētos, meaning "Philoxenus the Invincible") was an Indo-Greek king who ruled in the region spanning the Paropamisade to Punjab. Philoxenus seems to have been quite an important king who might briefly have ruled most of the Indo-Greek territory. Bopearachchi dates Philoxenus to c. 100–95 BC and R. C. Senior to c. 125–110 BC.

Historians have not yet connected Philoxenus with any dynasty, but he could have been the father of the princess Kalliope, who was married to the king Hermaeus.

== Coins of Philoxenos ==
Philoxenus struck several series of bilingual Indian silver coins, with a reverse of a mounted king, a type previously used as obverse by Antimachus II about sixty years earlier and as reverse on rare types of Nicias. Whether the horseman was a dynastic emblem or a portrait of the king as a cavalryman is unclear. Several Saka kings used similar horsemen on their coinage.

Philoxenus means "lover of foreigners" or "hospitable" in Greek, and considering that his drachms were square, a feature that was rare among Indo-Greeks but standard for Sakas, this shows that Philoxenus had good connection and relations with the nomads that had conquered Bactria.

Philoxenus also minted some Attic-type tetradrachms (with Greek legend only), meant for circulation in Bactria. These coins show the king either bareheaded and wearing a diadem, or wearing crested helmets on the obverse. The reverse shows most likely the king himself in Hellenistic military uniform and riding a horse. This design also shows the king making a blessing gesture with his right hand.

Philoxenus also struck bronzes with female deity/bull, or Helios/Nike.

== Overstrikes ==
One overstrike is known, of Epander over Philoxenus.

== Other coins ==
Philoxenus issued a variety of different coin standards, including some Attic coins, square Indian coins, and also circular bilingual coins with Greek and Kharosthi scripts.

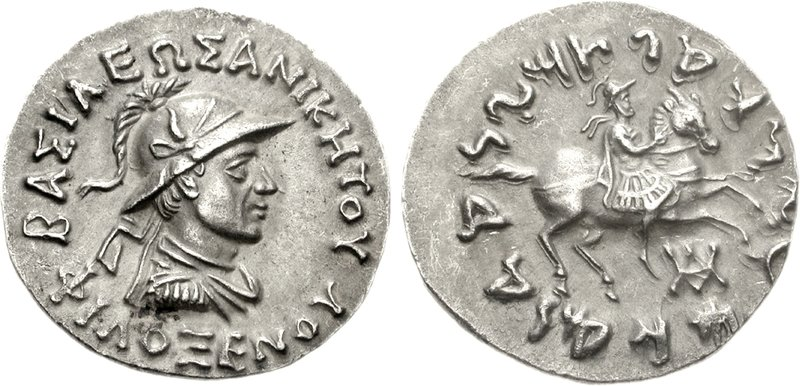
Silver coin of Philoxenus. Obverse shows the king wearing Boeotian helmet and diadem, with Greek legend: ΒΑΣΙΛΕΩΣ ΑΝΙΚΗΤΟΥ ΦΙΛΟΞΕΝΟΥ, Basileōs Anikētou Philoxenou, "Of the Invincible King Philoxenus". The Reverse with the king on horseback, and Kharosthi legend: Maharajasa Apadihatasa Philasinasa, "Of the Great Invincible King Philoxenus".

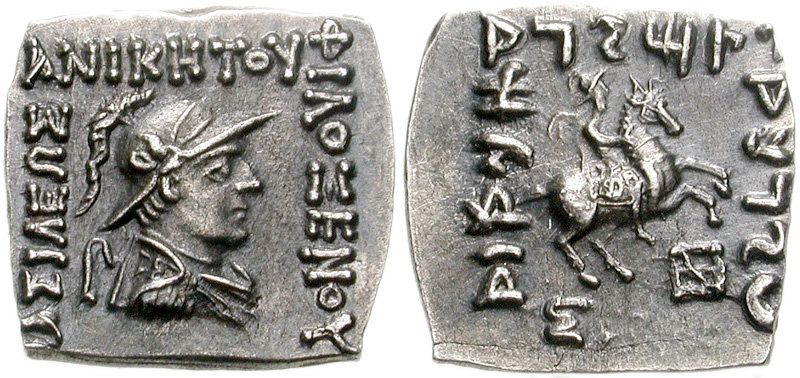
Indian square coin of Philoxenus, with the obverse showing the king wearing Boeotian helmet, with surrounding Greek legend. The reverse shows the king on horseback, and surrounding Kharosthi legend.

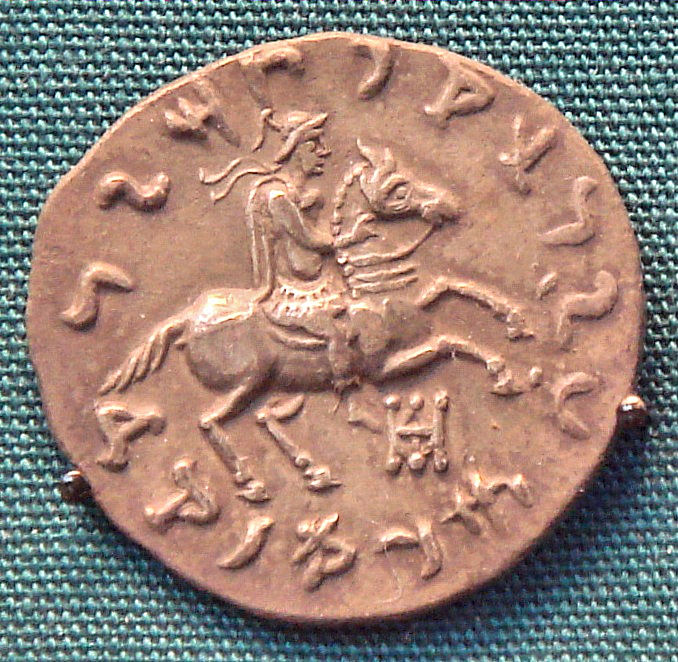
Another coin of Philoxenus. Reverse, showing the king in armour, wearing a crested Boeotian helmet, diadem, chlamys, and boots, while riding a galloping horse. He is also making a blessing gesture with his right hand.

== See also ==
- Greco-Bactrian Kingdom
- Seleucid Empire
- Greco-Buddhism
- Indo-Scythians
- Indo-Parthian Kingdom
- Kushan Empire

Preceded by Antialcidas (in Paropamisade, Arachosia, Gandhara)	Indo-Greek Ruler (in Paropamisadae, Arachosia, Gandhara, Punjab); 100 – 95 BC	Succeeded by Diomedes (in Paropamisade)
Preceded by Antialcidas (in Paropamisade, Arachosia, Gandhara)	Indo-Greek Ruler (in Paropamisadae, Arachosia, Gandhara, Punjab); 100 – 95 BC	Succeeded by Amyntas (in Arachosia, Gandhara)
Preceded by Demetrius III or Polyxenios (in Punjab)	Indo-Greek Ruler (in Paropamisadae, Arachosia, Gandhara, Punjab); 100 – 95 BC	Succeeded by Epander (in Punjab)

	Greco-Bactrian kings		Indo-Greek kings					
Territories/ dates	West Bactria	East Bactria	Paropamisade	Arachosia	Gandhara	Western Punjab	Eastern Punjab	Mathura
326-325 BCE	Campaigns of Alexander the Great in India						Nanda Empire	
312 BCE	Creation of the Seleucid Empire						Creation of the Maurya Empire	
305 BCE	Seleucid Empire after Mauryan war		Maurya Empire					
280 BCE	Foundation of Ai-Khanoum							
255–239 BCE	Independence of the Greco-Bactrian kingdom Diodotus I		Emperor Ashoka (268-232 BCE)					
239–223 BCE	Diodotus II							
230–200 BCE	Euthydemus I							
200–190 BCE	Demetrius I				Sunga Empire			
190-185 BCE	Euthydemus II							
190–180 BCE	Agathocles			Pantaleon				
185–170 BCE	Antimachus I							
180–160 BCE			Apollodotus I					
175–170 BCE	Demetrius II							
160–155 BCE			Antimachus II					
170–145 BCE	Eucratides I							
155–130 BCE	Yuezhi occupation, loss of Ai-Khanoum	Eucratides II; Plato; Heliocles I	Menander I					
130–120 BCE	Yuezhi occupation		Zoilus I		Agathoclea			Yavanarajya inscription
120–110 BCE			Lysias		Strato I			Yavanarajya inscription
110–100 BCE			Antialcidas		Heliocles II			Yavanarajya inscription
100 BCE			Polyxenus		Demetrius III			Yavanarajya inscription
100–95 BCE			Philoxenus					Yavanarajya inscription
95–90 BCE			Diomedes	Amyntas		Epander		Yavanarajya inscription
90 BCE			Theophilus	Peucolaus		Thraso		Yavanarajya inscription
90–85 BCE			Nicias	Menander II		Artemidorus		Yavanarajya inscription
90–70 BCE			Hermaeus	Archebius				Yavanarajya inscription
			Yuezhi occupation		Maues (Indo-Scythian)			
75–70 BCE				Vonones	Telephus	Apollodotus II		
65–55 BCE				Spalirises		Hippostratus	Dionysius	
55–35 BCE					Azes I (Indo-Scythians)		Zoilus II	
55–35 BCE					Vijayamitra/ Azilises		Apollophanes	
25 BCE – 10 CE				Gondophares	Zeionises	Kharahostes	Strato II; Strato III	
				Gondophares (Indo-Parthian)			Rajuvula (Indo-Scythian)	
			Kujula Kadphises (Kushan Empire)				Bhadayasa (Indo-Scythian)	Sodasa (Indo-Scythian)
