= Theodorus (meridarch) =

Meridarch of Swat, Indo-Greek Kingdom (1st century BC)

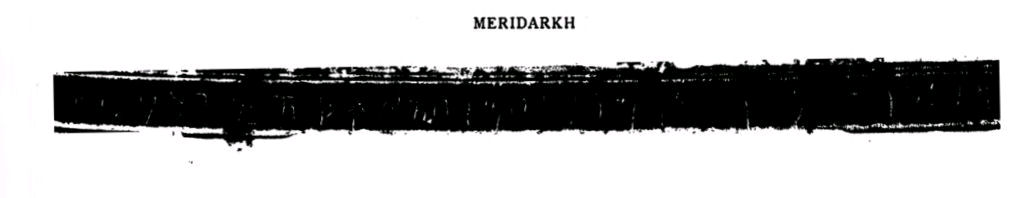
"Meridarch Theodorus" inscription on Swat relic vase.

Theodorus (Ancient Greek: Θεόδωρος) was a "meridarch" (Civil Governor of a province) in the Swat province of the Indo-Greek Kingdom, in Modern northern Pakistan, probably sometime between 100 BCE and the end of Greek rule in Gandhara in 55 BCE.

He is only known from a dedication written in kharoshthi on a relic vase inserted in a stupa in the Swat area of Gandhara, dated to the 1st century BCE, the relic vase is now kept at the Lahore Museum. (line-for-line translation):

== Description ==
"Theudorena meridarkhena
pratithavida
ime sarira
Sakamunisa bhagavato
bahu-jana-stitiye"

"The meridarch Theodorus
has enshrined
these relics
of Lord Shakyamuni,
for the welfare of the mass of the people"

(Swāt relic vase inscription of the Meridarkh Theodoros )

This inscription represents one of the first known mention of the Buddha as a deity, using the word Bhagavat ("Lord", "All-embracing personal deity"), suggesting the emergence of Mahayana doctrines in Buddhism.

It is also one of the examples Greco-Buddhism.

Theodorus is considered as contemporary or slightly posterior to another Indo-Greek named Heliodorus, whose c.100 BCE inscriptions have been preserved in the Heliodorus pillar.

== Sources ==
- Monnaies Gréco-Bactriennes et Indo-Grecques, Catalogue Raisonné, Osmund Bopearachchi, 1991, Bibliothèque Nationale de France, ISBN 2-7177-1825-7.
- The Shape of Ancient Thought. Comparative studies in Greek and Indian Philosophies by Thomas McEvilley (Allworth Press and the School of Visual Arts, 2002) ISBN 1-58115-203-5
- Buddhism in Central Asia by B.N. Puri (Motilal Banarsidass Pub, January 1, 2000) ISBN 81-208-0372-8
- The Greeks in Bactria and India, W.W. Tarn, Cambridge University Press.
- Stefan Baums. 2012. “Catalog and Revised Texts and Translations of Gandharan Reliquary Inscriptions.” In: David Jongeward, Elizabeth Errington, Richard Salomon and Stefan Baums, Gandharan Buddhist Reliquaries, p. 204, Seattle: Early Buddhist Manuscripts Project (Gandharan Studies, Volume 1).
- Stefan Baums and Andrew Glass. 2002– . Catalog of Gāndhārī Texts, no. CKI 32
