= Meridarch =

A meridarch or meridarches (Greek: μεριδάρχης, from meris, "division", and -arches, "ruler") was the civil governor of a province in the Hellenistic world (4th–1st centuries BCE), and could be translated as "Divisional Commissioner". Only a few mentions of meridarchs are known from ancient sources, one from Palestine, two others from the Indo-Greek kingdom in South Asia, one on a vase from Swat, the other on a copper plate from Taxila, and one belonging to Oḍirāja kingdom, also from Swat.

== Judea ==
Shortly after 153 BCE, Josephus relates, Alexander Balas appointed Jonathan Maccabeus as strategos (general) and meridarch (civil governor of a province) of Judea, and sent him back with honors to Jerusalem (I Macc. x. 51–66; Josephus, "Ant." xiii. 4, § 1).

== Indo-Greek kingdom ==
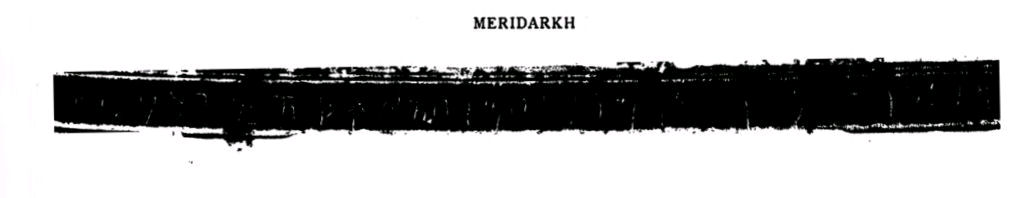
"Meridarch Theodorus" inscription in Swat relic vase.

At the far eastern end of the Hellenistic world, in northern India, an inscription in Kharosthi has been found on a relic vase in Swāt, referring to a "meridarch Theodorus" and his enshrinement of relics of the Buddha:

Theudorena meridarkhena pratithavida ime sarira sakamunisa bhagavato bahu-jana-stitiye.
The meridarch Theodorus has enshrined relics of Lord Shakyamuni, for the welfare of the mass of the people

— Swāt relic vase inscription of the Meridarkh Theodoros

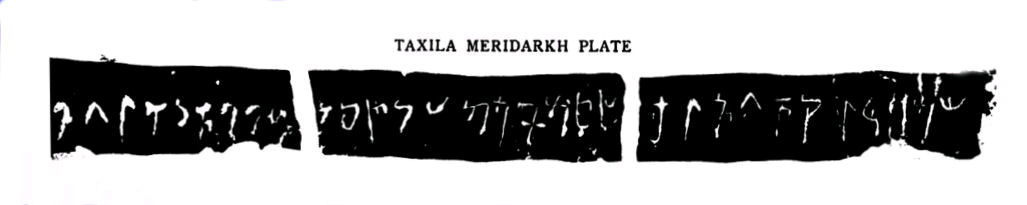
Taxila "meridarch" plate. The plate reads: "By....., the Meridarch, together with his wife. the stupa was established, in honor of (his) mother and father, for the presentation of a respectful offering."

Another mention of a Meridarch appears on the Taxila "meridarch" plate. The plate reads:

By....., the Meridarch, together with his wife. the stupa was established, in honor of (his) mother and father, for the presentation of a respectful offering.

— Taxila plate inscription

A third mention in form of gold leaf inscription of Senavarma, also from Swat Valley during the era of Oḍirājas, states that:

The (inscription) about the establishment of the relic was written by Saṃghamitra, son of Lalia, the anankaios, and (it) was manufactured by Ṣaḍia, son of Sacaka, the meridarch...

— Seṇavarma gold leaf inscription
