= Calliope (disambiguation) =

Calliope is the muse of epic poetry in Greek mythology.

Calliope, Kalliope or Kalliopi may also refer to:

== Arts, entertainment, and media ==
=== Fictional characters ===
- Calliope (God of War), in the video game series God of War
- Calliope, from the webcomic Homestuck
- Calliope, from the TV series Supernatural season 10 episode "Fan Fiction"
- Calliope Juniper, in the TV series The Simpsons season 22 episode "Flaming Moe"
- Calliope Torres, Callie Torres, in the TV series Grey's Anatomy
- Calliope, one of the wicked stepsisters from the 1997 TV film adaptation of Cinderella, played by Veanne Cox
- Calliope, one of the muses from Disney's Hercules
- Calliope, from the movie The Matrix Resurrections
- Calliope Jane, the title character from an episode of the BBC series Worzel Gummidge (2019 TV series)
- Calliope, one of the three Servant bosses from Dead Cells ’ The Queen and the Sea DLC

=== Music ===
- Calliope (music), a musical instrument
- Calliope (record label), a French record label
- Calliope (band), a Renaissance music band based in New York City
- "Calliope", an instrumental by Tom Waits from Blood Money
- "Calliope!", a song by The Veils from Nux Vomica

=== Periodicals ===
- Calliope, the literary magazine of the Dwight-Englewood School
- Kalliope, a student literary magazine at Pennsylvania State University

=== Other uses in arts, entertainment, and media ===
- Calliope (Sandman), a story in the 1990 collection Dream Country, from The Sandman series by Neil Gaiman
- Calliope (TV series), an animation program
- Calliope, another name for the Origins Award for outstanding work in the game industry

== Military ==
- HMS Calliope, five ships of the Royal Navy
- T34 Calliope, a tank-mounted rocket launcher

== People ==
=== In arts and media ===
- Kaliopi (born 1966), Macedonian singer
- Kalliope Amorphous (born 1978), American artist
- Mori Calliope (森カリオペ), virtual YouTuber and affiliated talent of Hololive Production
- Popi Malliotaki (born 1971), born Calliope Malliotaki, Greek singer
- Calliope "Callie" Thorne, American actress
- Calliope Tsoupaki (born 1963), Greek pianist and composer

=== In sport ===
- Kalliopi Araouzou (born 1991), Greek swimmer
- Kalliopi Ouzouni (born 1973), Greek shot putter
- Catherine Stratakis (born 1978), known as Kalliopi Stratakis in Greek, Greek-American footballer

=== In other fields ===
- Kalliopi (martyr) (died 250), also known as Saint Calliope, a 3rd-century Eastern martyr
- Kalliope (queen) (fl. first century BC), Indo-Greek queen of Paropamisadae
- Kalliopi Kehajia (1839-1905), Greek educator and feminist
- Calliope Spanou, Greek legal academic
- Calliope Tatti (1894-1978), Greek nurse

== Places ==
- Calliope, Iowa, U.S.
- Calliope Mountain, Alaska
- Calliope, Queensland, Australia
  - Calliope River, a river flowing through the area
  - Shire of Calliope, the former local government area which surrounded Calliope
- Calliope Dock, a historical stone drydock in Devonport, Auckland, New Zealand
- Calliope Projects, a housing project in New Orleans, Louisiana, US
- Kalliopi, Greece, a settlement on the island of Limnos

== Science and technology ==
- Calliope (genus), a songbird genus containing species formerly included in Luscinia
- Calliope hummingbird, a hummingbird species
- Calliope mini, a single-board computer developed for educational usage at German primary schools
- Calliope, an open source energy system model
- Project Calliope, a space project for DIY-making a picosatellite led by Sandy Antunes
- 22 Kalliope, an asteroid
- SS Kalliope, a number of steamships with this name
