= Menander I =

2nd-century BC Greco-Bactrian and Indo-Greek king

- Maharaja; Basileus
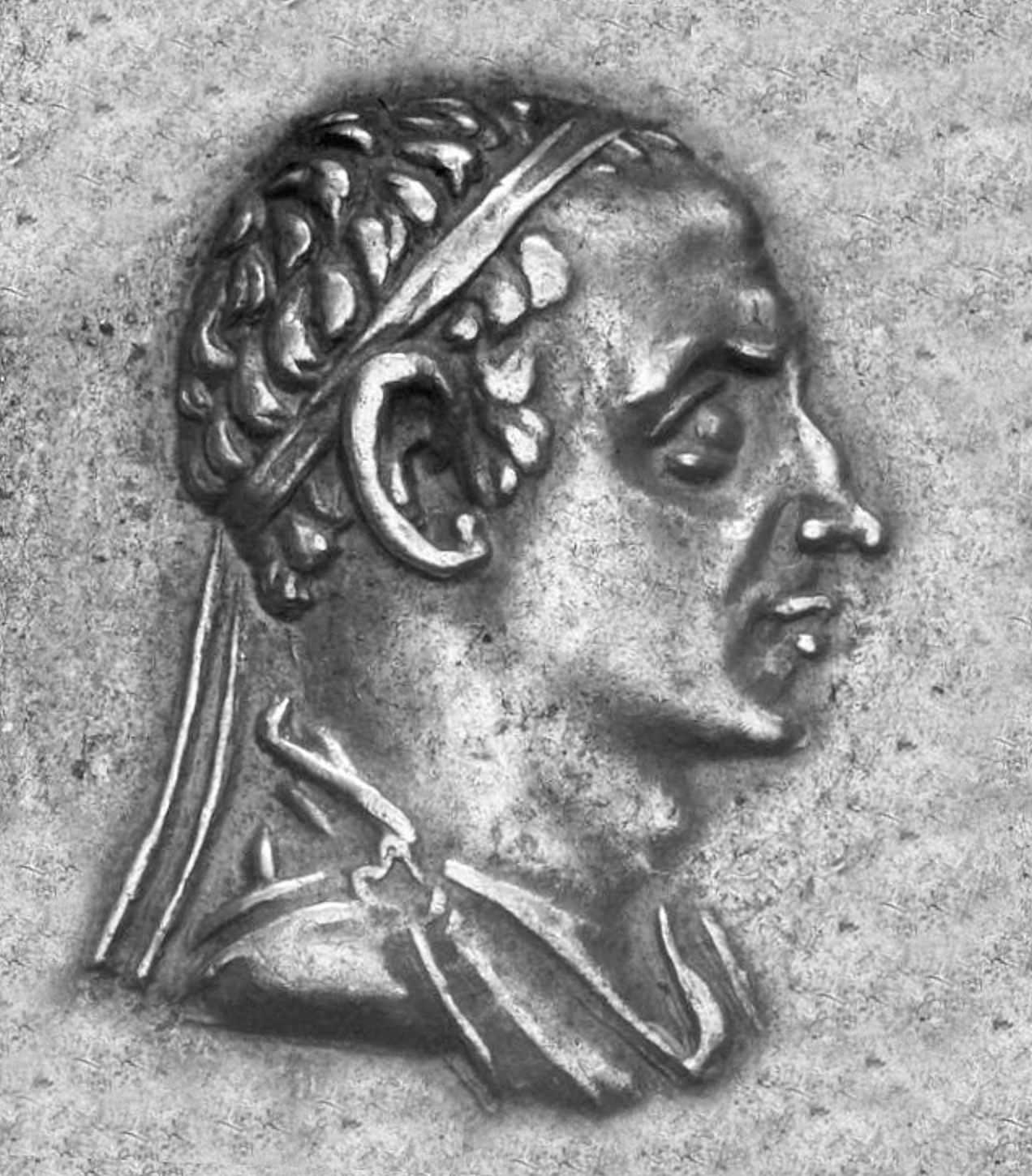
- Portrait of Menander I Soter, from his coinage

Indo-Greek King
- Reign: 165/155–130 BC
- Predecessor: Antimachus II
- Successor: Strato I (Agathoclea as regent)
- Born: c. 180 BC; Kapisa (in present-day Bagram, Afghanistan) or Sagala (present-day Sialkot, Pakistan)
- Died: 130 BC (aged 50)
- Burial: Stupas across the Indo-Greek Kingdom
- Consort: Agathoclea
- Issue: Strato I
- Religion: Greco-Buddhism

Menander I Soter (Ancient Greek: Μένανδρος Σωτήρ, romanized: Ménandros Sōtḗr, lit. 'Menander the Saviour'; Pali: Milinda), sometimes called Menander the Great, was an Indo-Greek king (reigned c. 165/155 –130 BC) who administered a large territory in the northwestern regions of the Indian subcontinent and Central Asia. Menander is noted for having become a patron of Greco-Buddhism and is regarded as the greatest and most well-known of the Indo-Greek kings.

Menander might have initially been a prince or king of Bactria. After conquering the Punjab, as far as Taxila and Sagala, he established an empire which stretched from the Kabul River in the west to the Ravi River in the east, and from the Swat River valley in the north to Arachosia (the Helmand Province). The Greek geographer Strabo wrote that he "conquered more tribes than Alexander the Great" in India. Ancient Indian writers indicate that he possibly launched expeditions southward into Rajputana (Rajasthan, Gujarat and Sindh) and central India (Gujarat and Malwa) and as far east down the Ganges River Valley as Pataliputra (Patna).

Large numbers of Menander's coins have been unearthed, attesting to both the flourishing commerce and longevity of his realm. Menander was also a patron of Buddhism. His conversations with the Buddhist sage Nagasena are recorded in the influential Buddhist work, the Milinda Panha ("The Questions of King Milinda"; panha meaning "question" in Pali). After his death in 130 BC, he was succeeded by his wife Agathoclea (possibly daughter of Agathocles or Eucratides) who ruled as regent for his son Strato I. Buddhist tradition relates that he handed over his kingdom to his son and retired from the world, but Plutarch says that he died in camp while on a military campaign, and that his remains were divided equally between the cities to be enshrined in monuments, probably stupas, across his realm.

== Reign ==
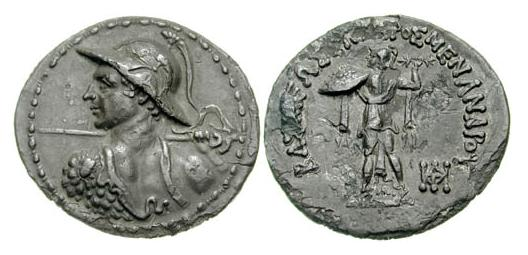
Attic Tetradrachm of Menander I in Greco-Bactrian style (Alexandria-Kapisa mint). Obv: Menander throwing a spear. Rev: Athena with thunderbolt. Greek legend: ΒΑΣΙΛΕΩΣ ΣΩΤΗΡΟΣ ΜΕΝΑΝΔΡΟΥ (BASILEOS SOTEROS MENANDROU), "Of King Menander, the Saviour".

Menander was born into a Greek family. One source states that his birthplace was a village called Kalasi adjacent to Alexandria of the Caucasus (present day Bagram, Afghanistan) but another states that it was near Sagala (modern Sialkot in the Punjab, Pakistan). His territories covered Bactria (modern-day Balkh Province) and extended to modern-day Khyber Pakhtunkhwa and Punjab. Gnaeus Pompeius Trogus and Justin call him a king of India. According to Plutarch he was a king of Bactria, and Strabo includes him among Bactrian Greek conquerors. He may have actually ruled over Bactria and may have helped Demetrius II Nicator, the Seleucid king, during the Seleucid–Parthian Wars. From the Hindu Kush, he expanded his kingdom to Gandhara and perhaps Kashmir. His capital is supposed to have been Sagala, a prosperous city in northern Punjab (believed to be modern Sialkot, Pakistan). According to Apollodorus of Artemita, as quoted by Strabo, the conquest of India by the Bactrian Greeks was effected mainly by Menander:

The Greeks who caused Bactria to revolt grew so powerful on account of the fertility of the country that they became masters, not only of Ariana, but also of India, as Apollodorus of Artemita says: and more tribes were subdued by them than by Alexander—by Menander in particular (at least if he actually crossed the Hypanis towards the east and advanced as far as the Imaus), for some were subdued by him personally and others by Demetrius, the son of Euthydemus the king of the Bactrians; and they took possession, not only of Patalena, but also, on the rest of the coast, of what is called the kingdom of Saraostus and Sigerdis. In short, Apollodorus says that Bactriana is the ornament of Ariana as a whole; and, more than that, they extended their empire even as far as the Seres and the Phryni.

— Strabo, Geographica

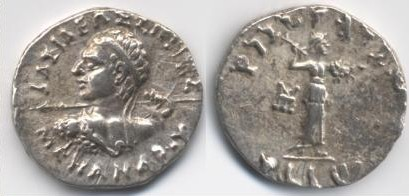
2. Silver drachm of Menander I (155-130 BC).; Obv: Greek legend, ΒΑΣΙΛΕΩΣ ΣΩΤΗΡΟΣ ΜΕΝΑΝΔΡΟΥ (BASILEOS SOTEROS MENANDROU) lit. "Of Saviour King Menander". Rev: Kharosthi legend: MAHARAJASA TRATARASA MENAMDRASA "Saviour King Menander". Athena advancing right, with thunderbolt and shield. Taxila mint mark.

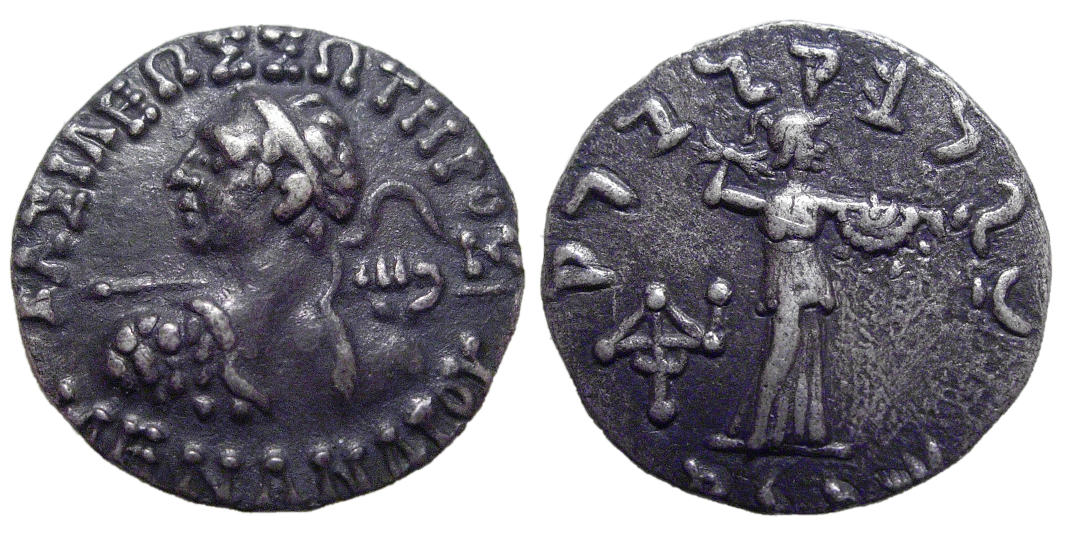
Another silver drachm of Menander I, dated circa 160-145 BC. Obverse: ΒΑΣΙΛΕΩΣ ΣΩΤΗΡΟΣ ΜΕΝΑΝΔΡΟΥ ('of King Menander the Saviour'), heroic bust of Menander, viewed from behind, head turned to the left; Reverse: Athena standing right, brandishing thunderbolt and holding aegis, Karosthi legend around, monogram in field to left. Reference: Sear 7604.

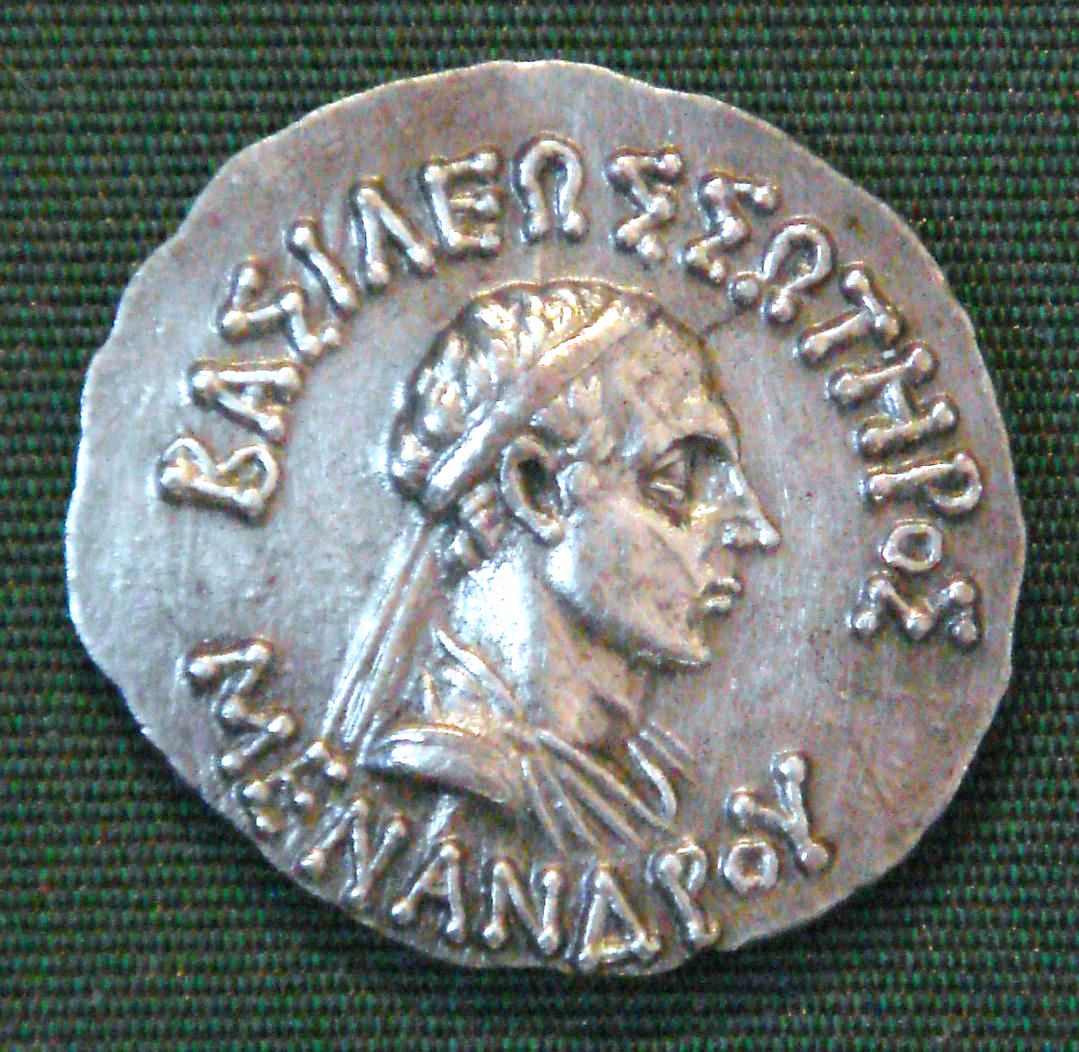
Silver coin of Menander Greek legend: ΒΑΣΙΛΕΩΣ ΣΩΤΗΡΟΣ ΜΕΝΑΝΔΡΟΥ (BASILEOS SOTEROS MENANDROU) lit. "Of Saviour King Menander". British Museum.

Accounts describe Indo-Greek campaigns to Sakala, Mathura, Panchala, Saketa (Ayodhya), and potentially Pataliputra. The sage Patanjali, in his Mahabhashya around 150 BC, describes a failed campaign of Menander as far as Mathura, this is also later reported in Kalidasa's drama, Mālavikāgnimitram. The Hathigumpha inscription inscribed by Kharavela the King of Kalinga also places the Yavanas, or Indo-Greeks, in Mathura. Kharavela states to have forced the demoralized Yavana army to retreat back to Mathura:

"Then in the eighth year, (Kharavela) with a large army having sacked Goradhagiri causes pressure on Rajagaha (Rajagriha). On account of the loud report of this act of valour, the Yavana (Greek) King [ta] retreated to Mathura having extricated his demoralized army."

— Hathigumpha inscription, lines 7-8, probably in the 1st century BCE-1st century CE. The original text is in Brahmi script.

Menander may have campaigned as far as the Shunga capital Pataliputra resulting in a conflict. The religious scripture Yuga Purana, which describes events in the form of a prophecy, states:

After having conquered Saketa, the country of the Panchala and the Mathuras, the Yavanas (Greeks), wicked and valiant, will reach Kusumadhvaja. The thick mud-fortifications at Pataliputra being reached, all the provinces will be in disorder, without a doubt. Ultimately, a great battle will follow, with tree-like engines (siege engines).

— Gargi-Samhita, Yuga Purana, ch. 5

Strabo also suggests that Indo-Greek conquests went up to the Shunga capital Pataliputra in northeastern India (today Patna):

Those who came after Alexander went to the Ganges and Pataliputra

— Strabo, 15.698

The events and results of these campaigns are unknown. Surviving epigraphical inscriptions during this time such as the Hathigumpha inscription states that Kharavela sacked Pataliputra. Furthermore, numismatics from the Mitra dynasty are concurrently placed in Mathura during the time of Menander. Their relationship is unclear, but the Mithra may potentially be vassals.

In the West, Menander seems to have repelled the invasion of the dynasty of Greco-Bactrian usurper Eucratides, and pushed them back as far as the Paropamisadae, thereby consolidating the rule of the Indo-Greek kings in the northwestern part of the Indian subcontinent.

The Milinda Panha gives some glimpses of his military methods:

– Has it ever happened to you, O king, that rival kings rose up against you as enemies and opponents?
– Yes, certainly.
– Then you set to work, I suppose, to have moats dug, and ramparts thrown up, and watch towers erected, and strongholds built, and stores of food collected?
– Not at all. All that had been prepared beforehand.
– Or you had yourself trained in the management of war elephants, and in horsemanship, and in the use of the war chariot, and in archery and fencing?
– Not at all. I had learnt all that before.
– But why?
– With the object of warding off future danger.

— Milinda Panha, Book III, ch. 7

Generous findings of coins testify to the prosperity and extent of his empire: (with finds as far as Britain) the finds of his coins are the most numerous and the most widespread of all the Indo-Greek kings. Precise dates of his reign, as well as his origin, remain elusive, however. Guesses among historians have been that Menander was either a nephew or a former general of the Greco-Bactrian king Demetrius I, but the two kings are now thought to be separated by at least thirty years. Menander's predecessor in Punjab seems to have been the king Apollodotus I.

Menander's empire survived him in a fragmented manner until the last Greek king Strato II disappeared around 10 AD.

The 1st-2nd century AD Periplus of the Erythraean Sea further testifies to the reign of Menander and the influence of the Indo-Greeks in India:

To the present day ancient drachmae are current in Barygaza, coming from this country, bearing inscriptions in Greek letters, and the devices of those who reigned after Alexander, Apollodorus [sic] and Menander.

— Periplus, ch. 47.

According to numismatist Joe Cribb, the accounts of Menander's kingdom stretching as far as Sialkot, is hard to believe, as there is no numismatic evidence of him east of Taxila, even more hard is to believe is stretching even further east as thought earlier by historians based upon Indian references, which most likely are referring to Kushans. However, numerous silver and copper coins (and Hellenistic pottery shards) of Menander have been found, including the Siranwali hoard found near Sialkot, and in the Sonipat hoard from present-day Haryana. Additional corroboration for mentions of Indo-Greek expeditions into the Gangetic plains may be furnished by the Yavanarajya inscription discovered in Mathura, and discoveries of Menander's coins in western Uttar Pradesh including the Pachkhura hoard of coins unearthed near the Yamuna River in Hamirpur district, Uttar Pradesh, and the unearthing of a clay pot filled with coins of preceding kings (Diodotus I, Diodotus II, and Euthydemus I) in Vaishali district, Bihar.

Bajaur is the only place where inscriptions of Menander have been found. However, large numbers of Menander's coins have been unearthed, mostly of silver and bronze, attesting to both the duration of his reign and the flourishing commerce of his realm. According to Buddhist tradition he handed over his kingdom to his son and retired from the world, but Plutarch relates that he died in camp while on a military campaign.

== Menander and Buddhism ==
=== The Milinda Panha ===
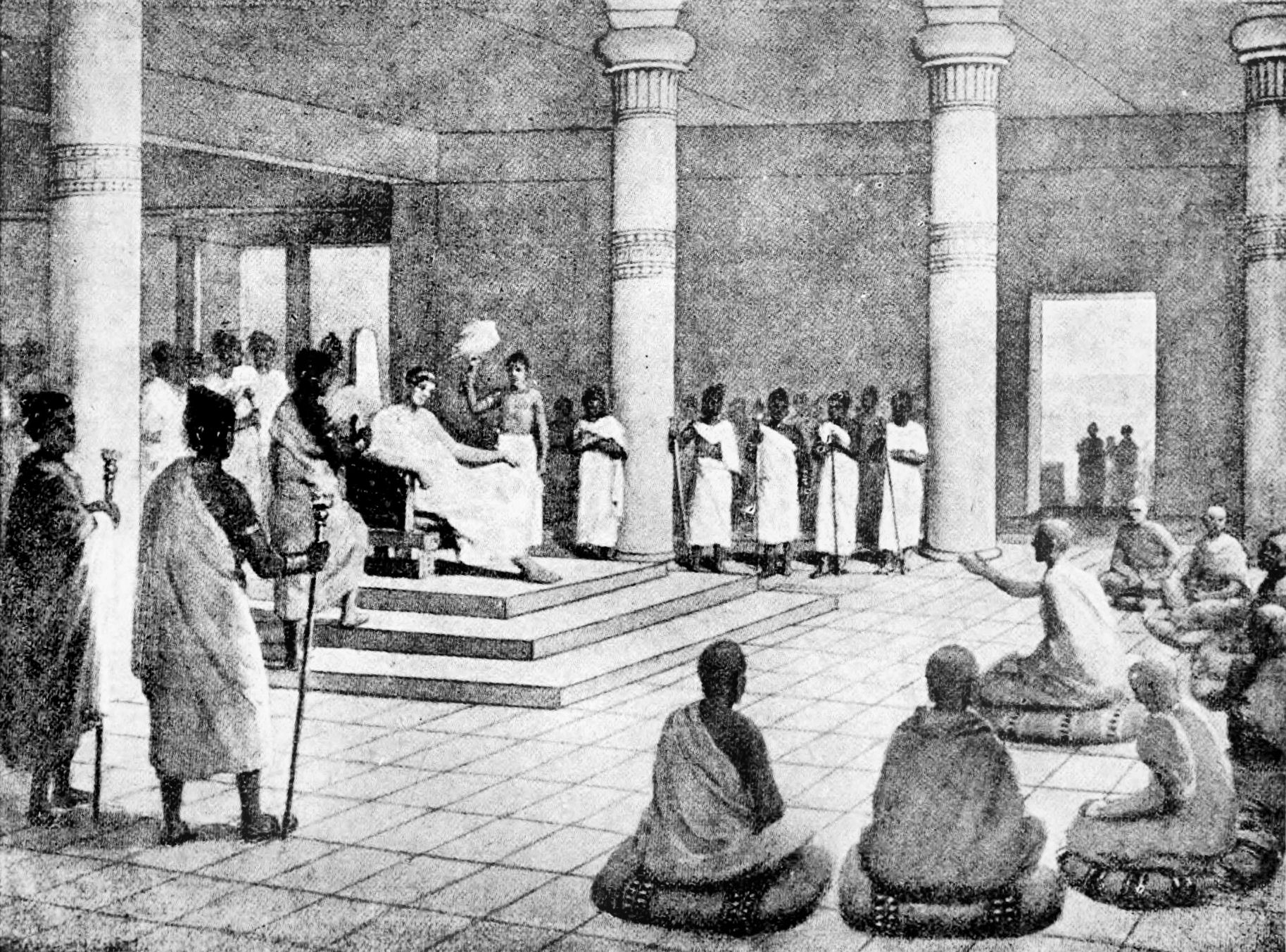
King Milinda asks questions.

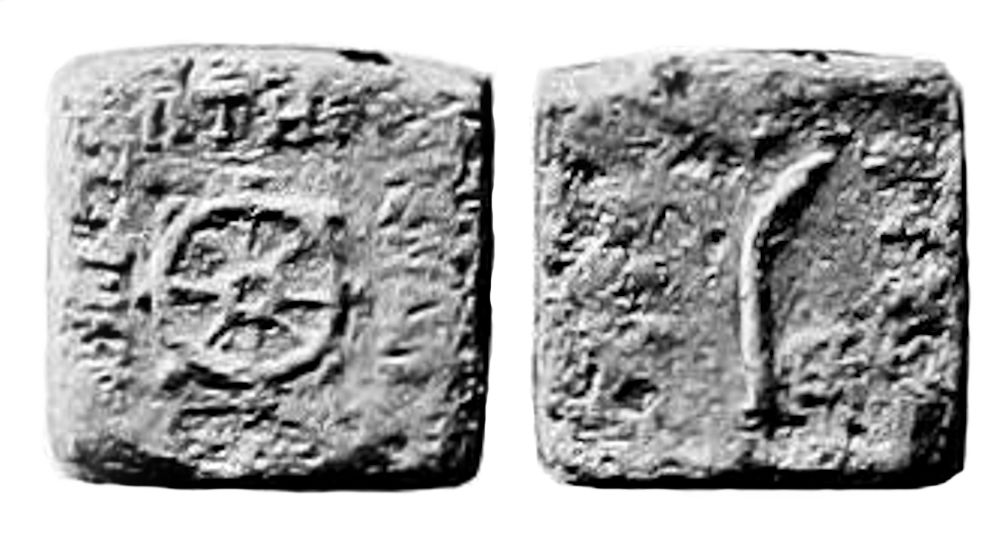
Indian-standard coinage of Menander I. Obv ΒΑΣΙΛΕΩΣ ΣΩΤΗΡΟΣ ΜΕΝΑΝΔΡΟΥ "Of Saviour King Menander". Rev Palm of victory, Kharoshthi legend Māhārajasa trātadasa Menandrāsa, British Museum.

According to tradition, Menander embraced the Buddhist faith, as described in the Milinda Panha, a classical Pali Buddhist text on the discussions between Milinda and the Buddhist sage Nāgasena, the Milinda Panha's style may have been influenced by Plato's Dialogues. He is described as constantly accompanied by an elite guard of 500 Greek ("Yavana") soldiers, and two of his counsellors are named Demetrius and Antiochus.

In the Milinda Panha, Menander is introduced as:

King of the city of Euthymedia in India, Milinda by name, learned, eloquent, wise, and able; and a faithful observer, and that at the right time, of all the various acts of devotion and ceremony enjoined by his own sacred hymns concerning things past, present, and to come. Many were the arts and sciences he knew--holy tradition and secular law; the Sânkhya, Yoga, Nyâya, and Vaisheshika systems of philosophy; arithmetic; music; medicine; the four Vedas, the Purânas, and the Itihâsas; astronomy, magic, causation, and magic spells; the art of war; poetry; conveyancing in a word, the whole nineteen. As a disputant he was hard to equal, harder still to overcome; the acknowledged superior of all the founders of the various schools of thought. And as in wisdom so in strength of body, swiftness, and valour there was found none equal to Milinda in all India. He was rich too, mighty in wealth and prosperity, and the number of his armed hosts knew no end.

— The Questions of King Milinda, Translation by T. W. Rhys Davids, 1890

Buddhist tradition relates that, following his discussions with Nāgasena, Menander adopted the Buddhist faith:

May the venerable Nâgasena accept me as a supporter of the faith, as a true convert from to-day onwards as long as life shall last!

— The Questions of King Milinda, Translation by T. W. Rhys Davids, 1890

He then handed over his kingdom to his son and retired from the world:

And afterwards, taking delight in the wisdom of the Elder, he handed over his kingdom to his son, and abandoning the household life for the houseless state, grew great in insight, and himself attained to Arahatship!

— The Questions of King Milinda, Translation by T. W. Rhys Davids, 1890

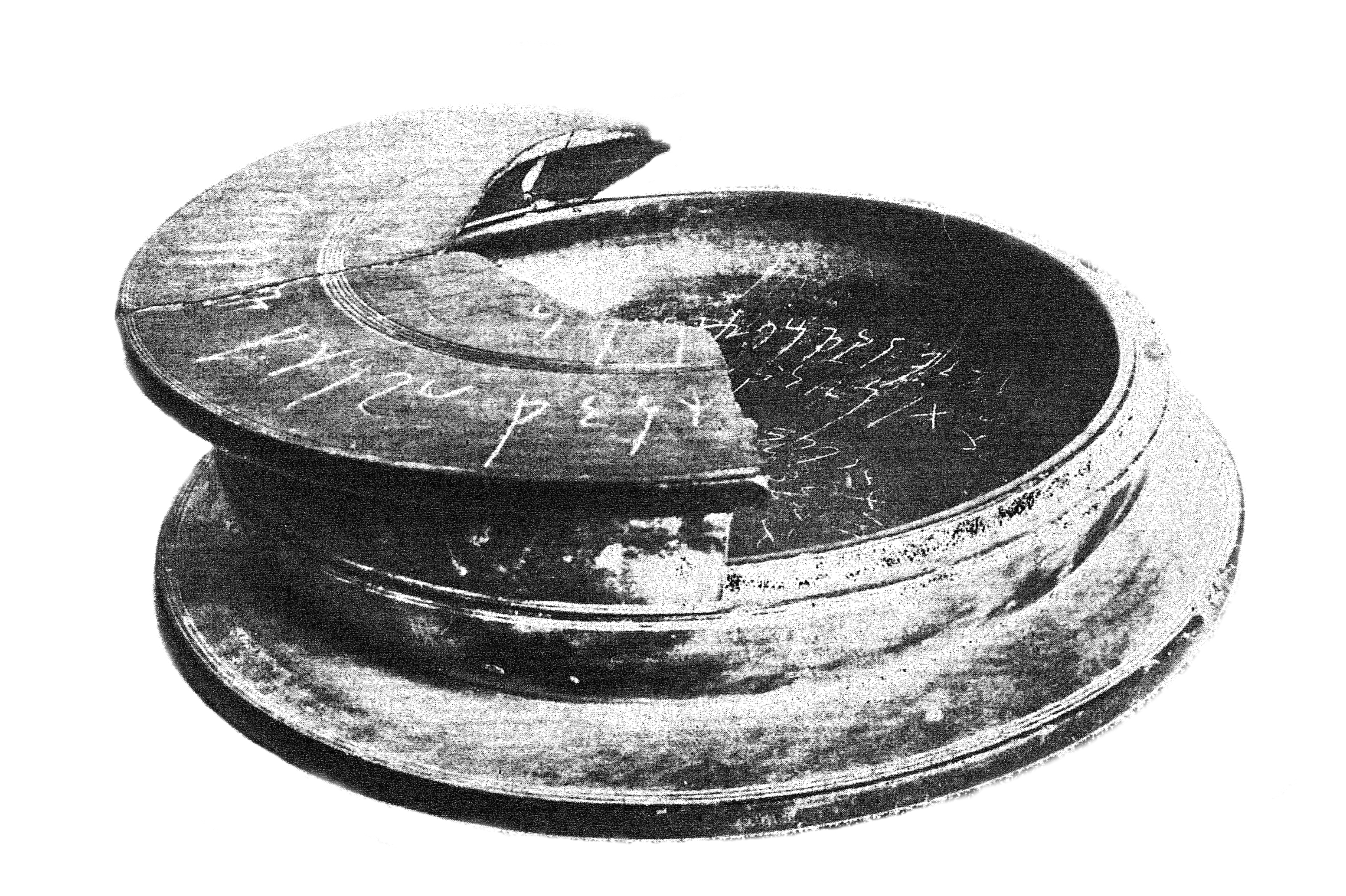
The Shinkot casket containing Buddhist relics was dedicated "in the reign of the Great King Menander".

There is however little besides this testament to indicate that Menander in fact abdicated his throne in favour of his son. Based on numismatic evidence, William Tarn believed that he in fact died, leaving his wife Agathocleia to rule as a regent, until his son Strato could rule properly in his stead. Despite the success of his reign, it is clear that after his death, his "loosely hung" empire splintered into a variety of Indo-Greek successor kingdoms, of various sizes and stability.

His legacy as a Buddhist arhat reached the Greco-Roman world and Plutarch writes:

But when one Menander, who had reigned graciously over the Bactrians, died afterwards in the camp, the cities indeed by common consent celebrated his funerals; but coming to a contest about his relics, they were difficultly at last brought to this agreement, that his ashes being distributed, everyone should carry away an equal share, and they should all erect monuments to him."

— Moralia 28.6

The above seems to corroborate the claim:

It is unlikely that Menander's support of Buddhism was a pious reconstruction of a Buddhist legend, for his deification by later traditions resonates with Macedonian religious trends that granted divine honours to monarchs and members of their family and worshipped them, like Alexander, as gods. It is no coincidence that similar motifs highlight the Buddha's deification and his funereal rituals are commensurate with those of Macedonian kings and universal monarchs. The evidence is in favour of the conversion of King Menander to Buddhism, which is neither an isolated historical incident nor an invention of later traditions."

=== Accounts From India ===
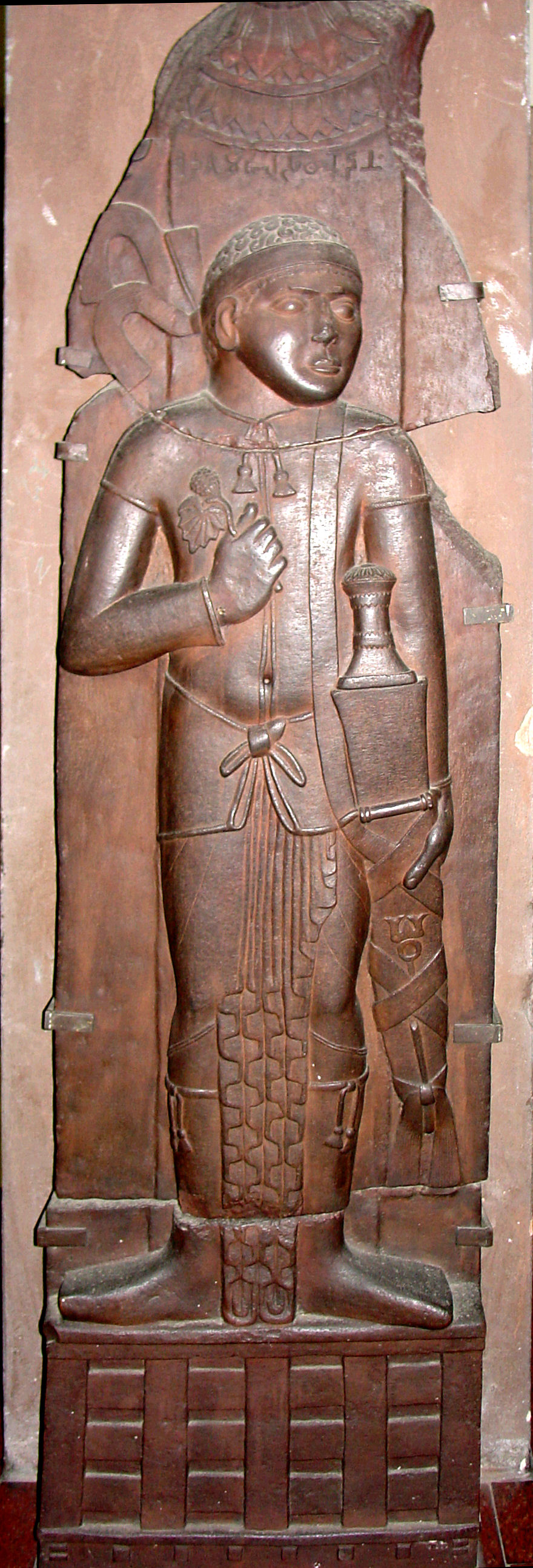
The Bharhut Yavana. Indian relief of a figure with the flowing head band of a Greek king, northern tunic with Hellenistic pleats, and Buddhist triratana symbol on his sword. Bharhut, 2nd century BC. Indian Museum, Calcutta.

- A 2nd century BC relief from a Buddhist stupa in Bharhut, in eastern Madhya Pradesh (today at the Indian Museum in Calcutta), the Bharhut Yavana, represents a foreign soldier with the curly hair of a Greek and the royal headband with flowing ends of a Greek king, and maybe a depiction of Menander. In his right hand, he holds a branch of ivy, a symbol of Dionysos. Also, parts of his dress, with rows of geometrical folds, are characteristically Hellenistic in style. On his sword appears the Buddhist symbol of the three jewels, or Triratana.
- A Buddhist reliquary found in Bajaur, the Shinkot casket, bears a dedicatory inscription referring to "the 14th day of the month of Kārttika" of a certain year in the reign of "Mahārāja Minadra" ("Great King Menander"):

Minadrasa maharajasa Katiassa divasa 4 4 4 11 pra[na]-[sa]me[da]... (prati)[thavi]ta pranasame[da]... Sakamunisa

Translation:

On the 14th day of Kārttika, in the reign of Mahārāja Minadra, (in the year ...), (the corporeal relic) of Sakyamuni, which is endowed with life... has been established

- According to an ancient Sri Lankan source, the Mahavamsa, Greek monks seem to have been active proselytizers of Buddhism during the time of Menander: the Yona (Greek) Mahadhammarakkhita (Sanskrit: Mahadharmaraksita) is said to have come from "Alasandra" (thought to be Alexandria of the Caucasus, the city founded by Alexander the Great, near today's Kabul) with 30,000 monks for the foundation ceremony of the Maha Thupa ("Great stupa") at Anuradhapura in Sri Lanka, during the 2nd century BC:

From Alasanda the city of the Yonas came the Thera ("Elder") Yona Mahadhammarakkhita with thirty thousand bhikkhus.

— Mahavamsa, 29

=== Buddhist constructions ===
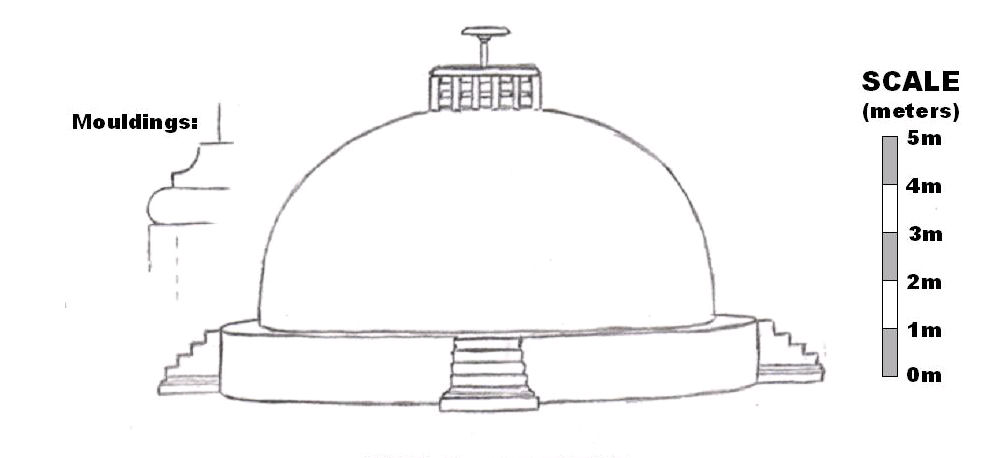
The Butkara stupa as expanded during the reign of Menander I.

A coin of Menander I was found in the second oldest stratum (GSt 2) of the Butkara stupa suggesting a period of additional constructions during the reign of Menander. It is thought that Menander was the builder of the second oldest layer of the Butkara stupa, following its initial construction during the Maurya Empire.

These elements tend to indicate the importance of Buddhism within Greek communities in northwestern India, and the prominent role Greek Buddhist monks played in them, probably under the sponsorship of Menander.

== Coinage ==
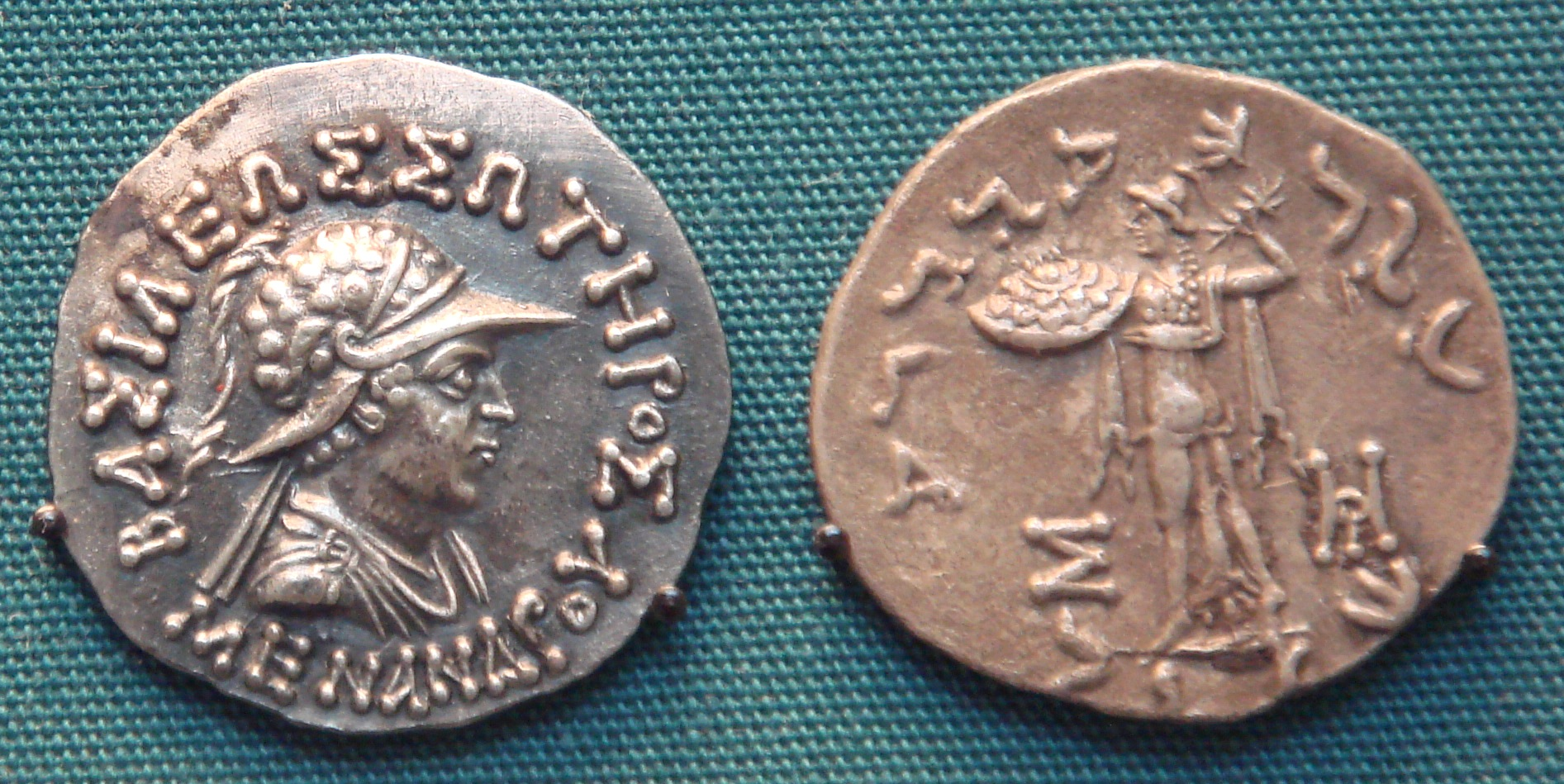
4. Silver coin of Menander, with Athena on reverse, British Museum.

Menander has left behind an immense corpus of silver and bronze coins, more so than any other Indo-Greek king, indicating the length of his long reign and a flourishing trade during it, and are the main source of his history. During his reign, the fusion between Indian and Greek coin standards reached its apogee. The wheel engraved on some of Menander's coins may be the Buddhist Dharmachakra. The coins feature the legend (Ancient Greek: ΒΑΣΙΛΕΩΣ ΣΩΤΗΡΟΣ ΜΕΝΑΝΔΡΟΥ, romanized: BASILEOS SOTEROS MENANDROU / Kharoshthi: MAHARAJA TRATARASA MENADRASA).

- According to Bopearachchi, his silver coinage begins with a rare series of drachma depicting on the obverse Athena and on the reverse her attribute the owl. The weight and monograms of this series match those of earlier king Antimachus II, indicating that Menander succeeded Antimachus II.
- On the next series, Menander introduces his own portrait, a hitherto unknown custom among Indian rulers. The reverse features his dynastical trademark: the so-called Athena Alkidemos throwing a thunderbolt, an emblem used by many of Menander's successors and also the emblem of the Antigonid kings of Macedonia.
- In a further development, Menander changed the legends from circular orientation to the arrangement seen on coin 4 to the right. This modification ensured that the coins could be read without being rotated, and was used without exception by all later Indo-Greek kings.

These alterations were possibly an adaption on Menander's part to the Indian coins of the Bactrian Eucratides I, who had conquered the westernmost parts of the Indo-Greek kingdom, and are interpreted by Bopearachchi as an indication that Menander recaptured these western territories after the death of Eucratides.

- Menander also struck very rare Attic standard coinage with monolingual inscriptions (coin 5), which were probably intended for use in Bactria (where they have been found), perhaps thought to demonstrate his victories against the Bactrian kings, as well as Menander's own claim to the kingdom.
- There exist bronze coins of Menander featuring a manifold variation of Olympic, Indian, and other symbols. It seems as though Menander introduced a new weight standard for bronzes.

Menander was the first Indo-Greek ruler to introduce the representation of Athena Alkidemos ("Athena, saviour of the people") on his coins, probably in reference to a similar statue of Athena Alkidemos in Pella, capital of Macedon. This type was subsequently used by most of the later Indo-Greek kings.

== Menander the Just ==
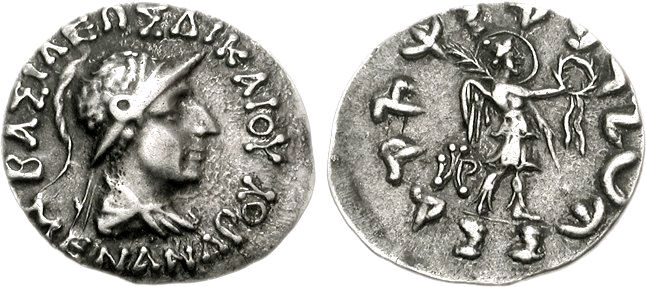
Coin of Menander II. Greek legend: ΒΑΣΙΛΕΩΣ ΔΙΚΑΙΟΥ ΜΕΝΑΝΔΡΟΥ, "Of King Menander, the Just".

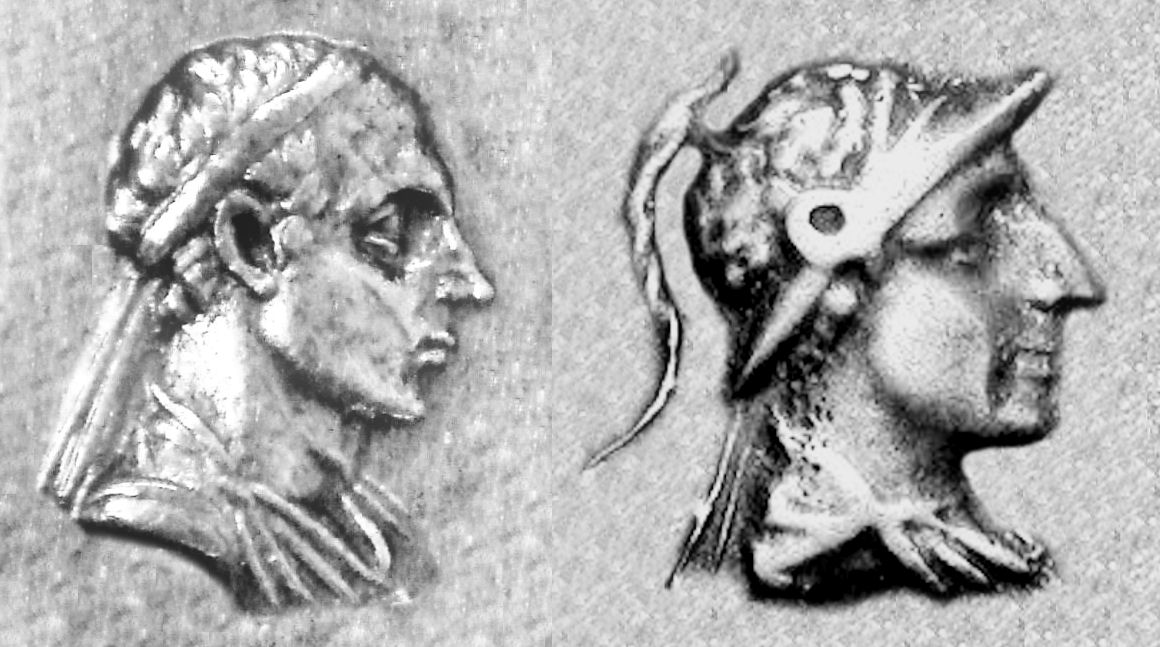
Comparison of the portraits of Menander I (left) and Menander II (right).

A king named Menander with the epithet Dikaios, "the Just", ruled in Punjab after 100 BC. Earlier scholars, such as A. Cunningham and W. W. Tarn, believed there was only one Menander, and assumed that the king had changed his epithet and/or was expelled from his western dominions. A number of coincidences led them to this assumption:

- The portraits are relatively similar, and Menander II usually looks older than Menander I.
- The coins of Menander II feature several Buddhist symbols, which were interpreted as proof of the conversion mentioned in the Milinda Panha.
- The epithet Dikaios of Menander II was translated into Kharosthi as Dharmikasa or Dharmamitra on the reverse of his coins, which means "follower of the Dharma" and was interpreted likewise (taken as Menander's conversion to Buddhism).

However, modern numismatists such as Bopearachchi and R.C. Senior have shown, by differences in coin findings, style, and monograms, that there were two distinct rulers. The second Menander could have been a descendant of the first, and his Buddhist symbols may have been a means of alluding to his ancestor's conversion. However, Menander I struck a rare bronze series with a Buddhist wheel (coin 3).

== Menander's death ==
Buddhist tradition holds that he was succeeded by his son and retired. Though Plutarch reports that Menander died in camp while on campaign, thereby differing with the version of the Milinda Panha. Plutarch gives Menander as an example of benevolent rule, contrasting him with disliked tyrants such as Dionysius, and goes on to explain that his subject towns fought over the honour of his burial, ultimately sharing his ashes among them and placing them in "monuments" (possibly stupas), in a manner reminiscent of the funerals of the Buddha. This has been taken as an evidence of his conversion to Buddhism, though modern scholars doubt Plutarch's account and he may have actually confused Menander's death with the account of the Buddha.

But when one Menander, who had reigned graciously over the Bactrians, died afterwards in the camp, the cities indeed by common consent celebrated his funerals; but coming to a contest about his relics, they were difficultly at last brought to this agreement, that his ashes being distributed, everyone should carry away an equal share, and they should all erect monuments to him.

— Plutarch, Moralia: Praecepta gerendae reipublicae

Despite his many successes, Menander's last years may have been fraught with another civil war, this time against Zoilos I who reigned in Gandhara. This is indicated by the fact that Menander probably overstruck a coin of Zoilos.

The Milinda Panha might give some support to the idea that Menander's position was precarious, since it describes him as being somewhat cornered by numerous enemies into a circumscribed territory:

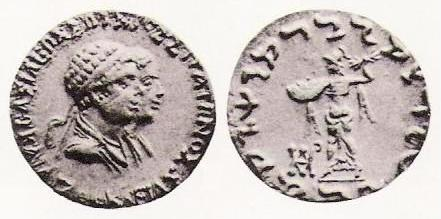
Coin of Strato I and Agathokleia. Obv: Conjugate busts of Strato and Agathokleia. Greek legend: BASILEOS SOTEROS STRATONOS KAI AGATOKLEIAS "Of King Strato the Saviour and Agathokleia". Rev: Athena throwing thunderbolt. Kharoshthi legend: MAHARAJASA TRATASARA DHARMIKASA STRATASA "King Strato, Saviour and Just (="of the Dharma")".

After their long discussion Nagasaka asked himself "though king Milinda is pleased, he gives no signs of being pleased". Menander says in reply: "As a lion, the king of beasts, when put in a cage, though it were of gold, is still facing outside, even so, do I live as the master in the house but remain facing outside. But if I were to go forth from home into homelessness I would not live long, so many are my enemies".

— Quoted in Bopearachchi, Milinda Panha, Book III, Chapter 7

=== Theories of Menander's successors ===
Menander was the last Indo-Greek king mentioned by ancient historians, and developments after his death are therefore difficult to trace.

a) The traditional view, supported by W.W. Tarn and Bopearachchi, is that Menander was succeeded by his queen Agathoclea, who acted as regent to their infant son Strato I until he became an adult and took over the crown. Strato I used the same reverse as Menander I, Athena hurling a thunderbolt, and also the title Soter.

According to this scenario, Agathoclea and Strato I only managed to maintain themselves in the eastern parts of the kingdom, Punjab, and at times Gandhara. Paropamisadae and Pushkalavati were taken over by Zoilos I, perhaps because some of Agathokleia's subjects may have been reluctant to accept an infant king with a queen regent.

b) On the other hand, R.C. Senior and other numismatics such as David Bivar have suggested that Strato I ruled several decades after Menander: they point out that Strato's and Agathoclea's monograms are usually different from Menander's, and overstrikes and hoard findings also associate them with later kings.

In this scenario, Menander was briefly succeeded by his son Thrason, of whom a single coin is known. After Thrason was murdered, competing kings such as Zoilos I or Lysias may have taken over Menander's kingdom. Menander's dynasty was thus dethroned and did not return to power until later, though his relative Nicias may have ruled a small principality in the Kabul valley.

For the family tree that illustrates these relationships, see Family tree of the Indo-Greek kings (see the Menanderid dynasty).

== Legacy ==
=== Buddhism ===
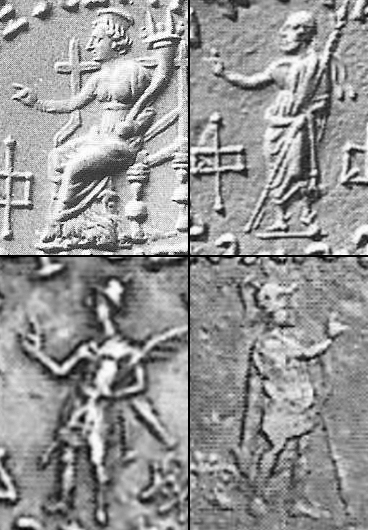
Vitarka Mudra gestures on Indo-Greek coinage. Top: Divinities Tyche and Zeus. Bottom: Depiction of Indo-Greek kings Nicias and Menander II.

After the reign of Menander I, Strato I and several subsequent Indo-Greek rulers, such as Amyntas, Nicias, Peucolaus, Hermaeus, and Hippostratus, depicted themselves or their Greek deities forming with the right hand a symbolic gesture identical to the Buddhist vitarka mudra (thumb and index joined together, with other fingers extended), which in Buddhism signifies the transmission of the Buddha's teaching. At the same time, right after the death of Menander, several Indo-Greek rulers also started to adopt on their coins the Pali title of "Dharmikasa", meaning "follower of the Dharma" (the title of the great Indian Buddhist king Ashoka was Dharmaraja "King of the Dharma"). This usage was adopted by Strato I, Zoilos I, Heliocles II, Theophilus, Peucolaus and Archebius.

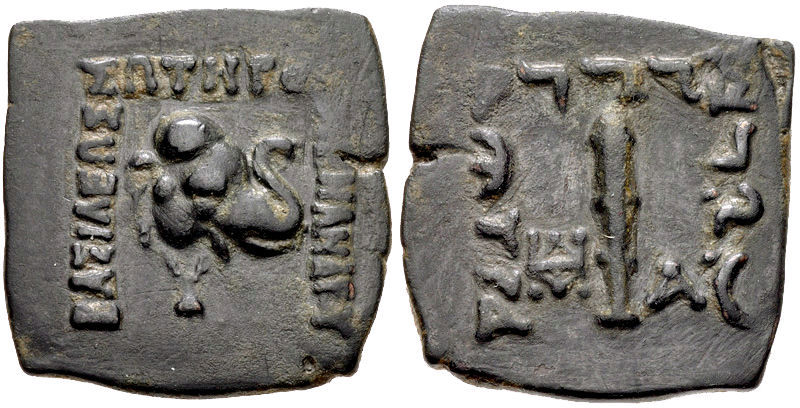
Menander coin with elephant.

Altogether, the conversion of Menander to Buddhism suggested by the Milinda Panha seems to have triggered the use of Buddhist symbolism in one form or another on the coinage of close to half of the kings who succeeded him. Especially, all the kings after Menander who are recorded to have ruled in Gandhara (apart from the little-known Demetrius III) display Buddhist symbolism in one form or another.

Menander may have contributed to the expansion of Buddhism in Central Asia. Although the spread of Buddhism to Central Asia and Northern Asia is usually associated with the Kushans, a century or two later, there is a possibility that it may have been introduced in those areas from Gandhara "even earlier, during the time of Demetrius and Menander" (Puri, "Buddhism in Central Asia").

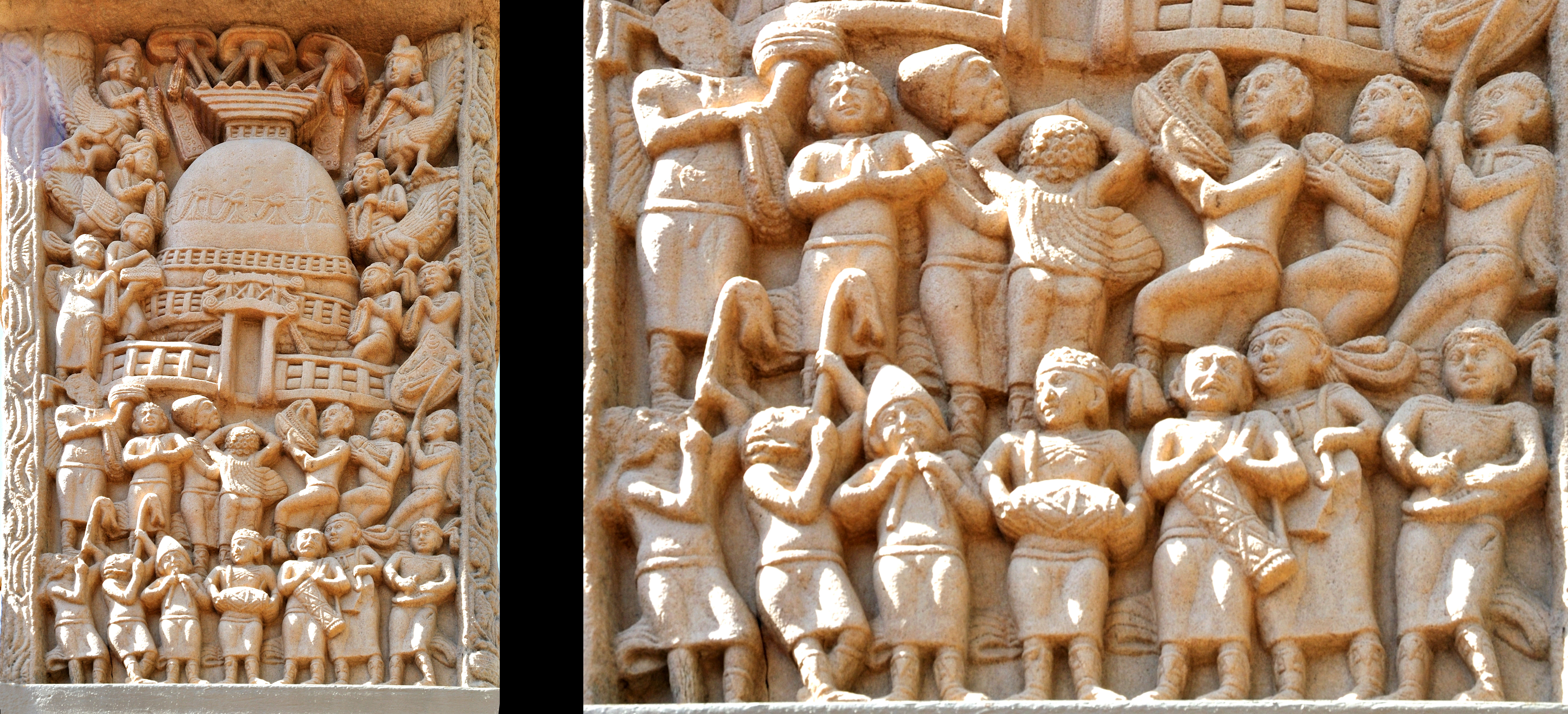
Foreigners on the Northern Gateway of Stupa I, Sanchi. Satavahana period, 2nd or 1st century BC.

A frieze in Sanchi executed during or soon after the reign of Menander depicts Buddhist devotees in Greek attire. The men are depicted with short curly hair, often held together with a headband of the type commonly seen on Greek coins. The clothing too is Greek, complete with tunics, capes and sandals. The musical instruments are also quite characteristic, such as the double flute called aulos. Also visible are Carnyx-like horns. They are all celebrating at the entrance of the stupa. These men would probably be nearby Indo-Greeks from northwest India visiting the Stupa.

=== Representation of the Buddha ===
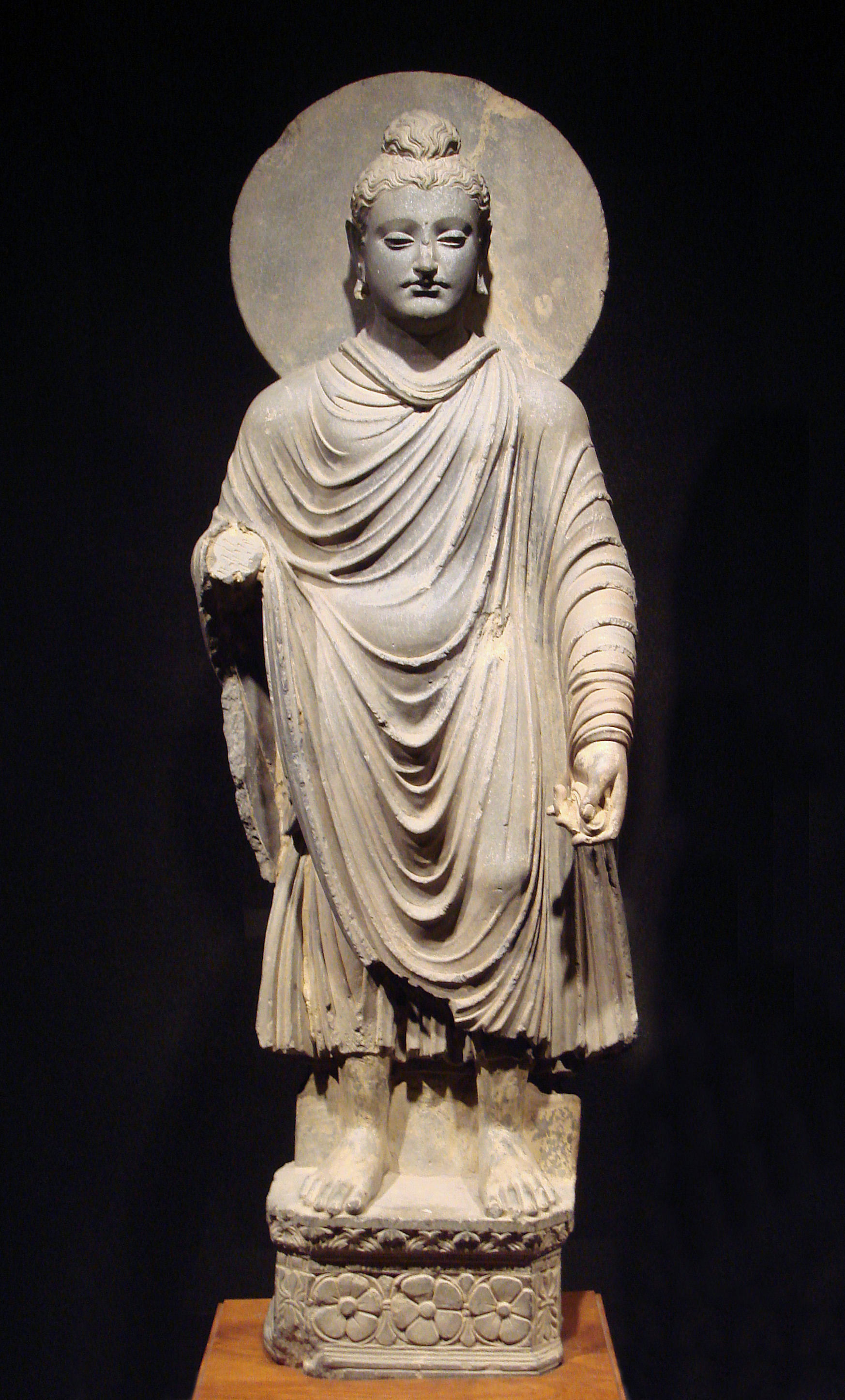
One of the first known representations of the Buddha, Gandhara.

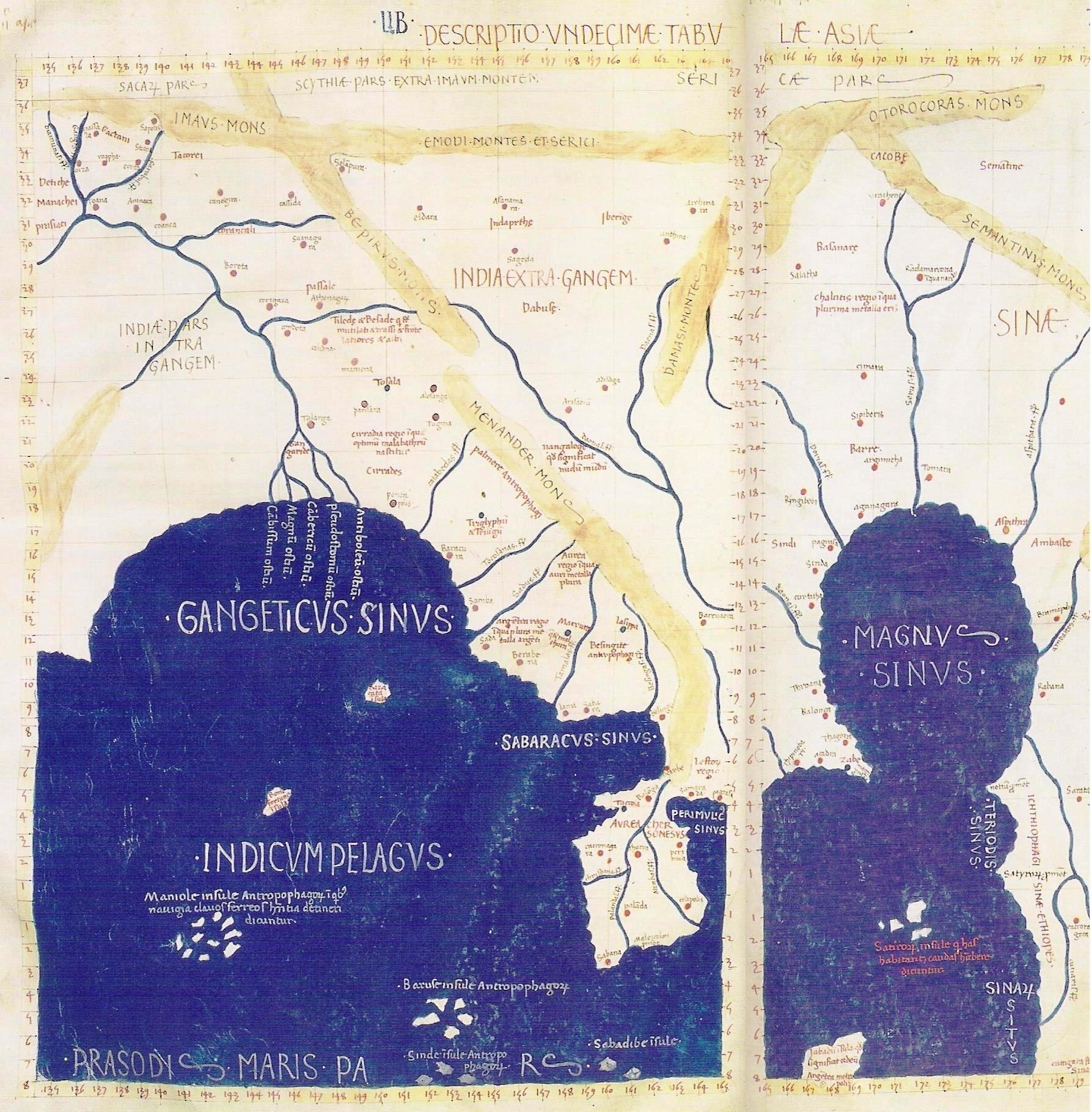
Detail of Asia in the Ptolemy world map. The "Menander Mons" are in the center of the map, at the east of the Indian subcontinent, right above the Malaysian Peninsula.

The anthropomorphic representation of the Buddha is absent from Indo-Greek coinage, suggesting that the Indo-Greek kings may have respected the Indian an-iconic rule for depictions of the Buddha, limiting themselves to symbolic representation only. Consistently with this perspective, the actual depiction of the Buddha would be a later phenomenon, usually dated to the 1st century, emerging from the sponsorship of the syncretic Kushan Empire and executed by Greek, and, later, Indian and possibly Roman artists. Datation of Greco-Buddhist statues is generally uncertain, but they are at least firmly established from the 1st century.

Another possibility is that just as the Indo-Greeks routinely represented philosophers in statues (but certainly not on coins) in Antiquity, the Indo-Greek may have initiated anthropomorphic representations of the Buddha in statuary only, possibly as soon as the 2nd-1st century BC, as advocated by Foucher and suggested by Chinese murals depicting Emperor Wu of Han worshipping Buddha statues brought from Central Asia in 120 BC (See picture). An Indo-Chinese tradition also explains that Nagasena, also known as Menander's Buddhist teacher, created in 43 BC in the city of Pataliputra a statue of the Buddha, the Emerald Buddha, which was later brought to Thailand.

Stylistically, Indo-Greek coins generally display a very high level of Hellenistic artistic realism, which declined drastically around 50 BC with the invasions of the Indo-Scythians, Yuezhi and Indo-Parthians. The first known statues of the Buddha are also very realistic and Hellenistic in style and are more consistent with the pre-50 BC artistic level seen on coins.

This would tend to suggest that the first statues were created between 130 BC (death of Menander) and 50 BC, precisely at the time when Buddhist symbolism appeared on Indo-Greek coinage. From that time, Menander and his successors may have been the key propagators of Buddhist ideas and representations: "the spread of Gandhari Buddhism may have been stimulated by Menander's royal patronage, as may have the development and spread of Gandharan sculpture, which seems to have accompanied it" (Mcevilley, "The Shape of Ancient Thought", p. 378).

=== Education ===
The Milind College in the city of Aurangabad, India, is named after King Menander I using the Pali translation of his name, Milind. The college was founded in part by Bhimrao Ramji Ambedkar, an Indian leader of the Dalit Buddhist movement and writer to the constitution of the Republic of India.

=== Geography ===
In Classical Antiquity, from at least the 1st century, the "Menander Mons", or "Mountains of Menander", came to designate the mountain chain at the extreme east of the Indian subcontinent, today's Naga Hills and Arakan, as indicated in the Ptolemy world map of the 1st century geographer Ptolemy.

== See also ==
- Kanishka
- Indo-Greek Kingdom
- Greco-Buddhism
- Indo-Scythians

== Notes ==
Preceded by Demetrius II of India	Indo-Greek ruler (in Paropamisadae, Arachosia, Gandhara, Punjab); 155/150 – 130 BC	Succeeded by Zoilos I (in Paropamisadae, Arachosia)
Preceded by Demetrius II of India	Indo-Greek ruler (in Paropamisadae, Arachosia, Gandhara, Punjab); 155/150 – 130 BC	Succeeded by Agathokleia (in Gandhara, Punjab)

	Greco-Bactrian kings		Indo-Greek kings					
Territories/ dates	West Bactria	East Bactria	Paropamisade	Arachosia	Gandhara	Western Punjab	Eastern Punjab	Mathura
326-325 BCE	Campaigns of Alexander the Great in India						Nanda Empire	
312 BCE	Creation of the Seleucid Empire						Creation of the Maurya Empire	
305 BCE	Seleucid Empire after Mauryan war		Maurya Empire					
280 BCE	Foundation of Ai-Khanoum							
255–239 BCE	Independence of the Greco-Bactrian kingdom Diodotus I		Emperor Ashoka (268-232 BCE)					
239–223 BCE	Diodotus II							
230–200 BCE	Euthydemus I							
200–190 BCE	Demetrius I				Sunga Empire			
190-185 BCE	Euthydemus II							
190–180 BCE	Agathocles			Pantaleon				
185–170 BCE	Antimachus I							
180–160 BCE			Apollodotus I					
175–170 BCE	Demetrius II							
160–155 BCE			Antimachus II					
170–145 BCE	Eucratides I							
155–130 BCE	Yuezhi occupation, loss of Ai-Khanoum	Eucratides II; Plato; Heliocles I	Menander I					
130–120 BCE	Yuezhi occupation		Zoilus I		Agathoclea			Yavanarajya inscription
120–110 BCE			Lysias		Strato I			Yavanarajya inscription
110–100 BCE			Antialcidas		Heliocles II			Yavanarajya inscription
100 BCE			Polyxenus		Demetrius III			Yavanarajya inscription
100–95 BCE			Philoxenus					Yavanarajya inscription
95–90 BCE			Diomedes	Amyntas		Epander		Yavanarajya inscription
90 BCE			Theophilus	Peucolaus		Thraso		Yavanarajya inscription
90–85 BCE			Nicias	Menander II		Artemidorus		Yavanarajya inscription
90–70 BCE			Hermaeus	Archebius				Yavanarajya inscription
			Yuezhi occupation		Maues (Indo-Scythian)			
75–70 BCE				Vonones	Telephus	Apollodotus II		
65–55 BCE				Spalirises		Hippostratus	Dionysius	
55–35 BCE					Azes I (Indo-Scythians)		Zoilus II	
55–35 BCE					Vijayamitra/ Azilises		Apollophanes	
25 BCE – 10 CE				Gondophares	Zeionises	Kharahostes	Strato II; Strato III	
				Gondophares (Indo-Parthian)			Rajuvula (Indo-Scythian)	
			Kujula Kadphises (Kushan Empire)				Bhadayasa (Indo-Scythian)	Sodasa (Indo-Scythian)
