= Athena Alkidemos =

Divine epithet for Athena worshipped at Pella, Macedonia

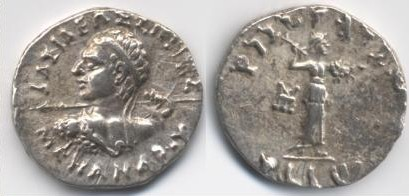
2. Silver drachm of Menander I(155-130 BC).; Obv: Greek legend, ΒΑΣΙΛΕΩΣ ΣΩΤΗΡΟΣ ΜΕΝΑΝΔΡΟΥ (BASILEOS SOTEROS MENANDROU) lit. "Of Saviour King Menander". Rev: Kharosthi legend: MAHARAJA TRATASA MENADRASA "Saviour King Menander". Athena Alkidemos advancing right, with thunderbolt and shield. Menander I was the first Indo-Greek ruler to introduce the representation of Athena Alkidemos ("Athena, saviour of the people") on his coins ):

Alkidemos or Alcidemos (defender of the people, demos) is a divine epithet, attested only by the Roman historian Livy (42.51), for the goddess Athena worshipped at Pella, Macedonia. A similar Macedonian epithet of Athena was Alcis. Athena Alkidemos with thunderbolt and shield (aegis) was a usual depiction in Hellenistic tetradrachms.
