= Shinkot casket =

Buddhist reliquary

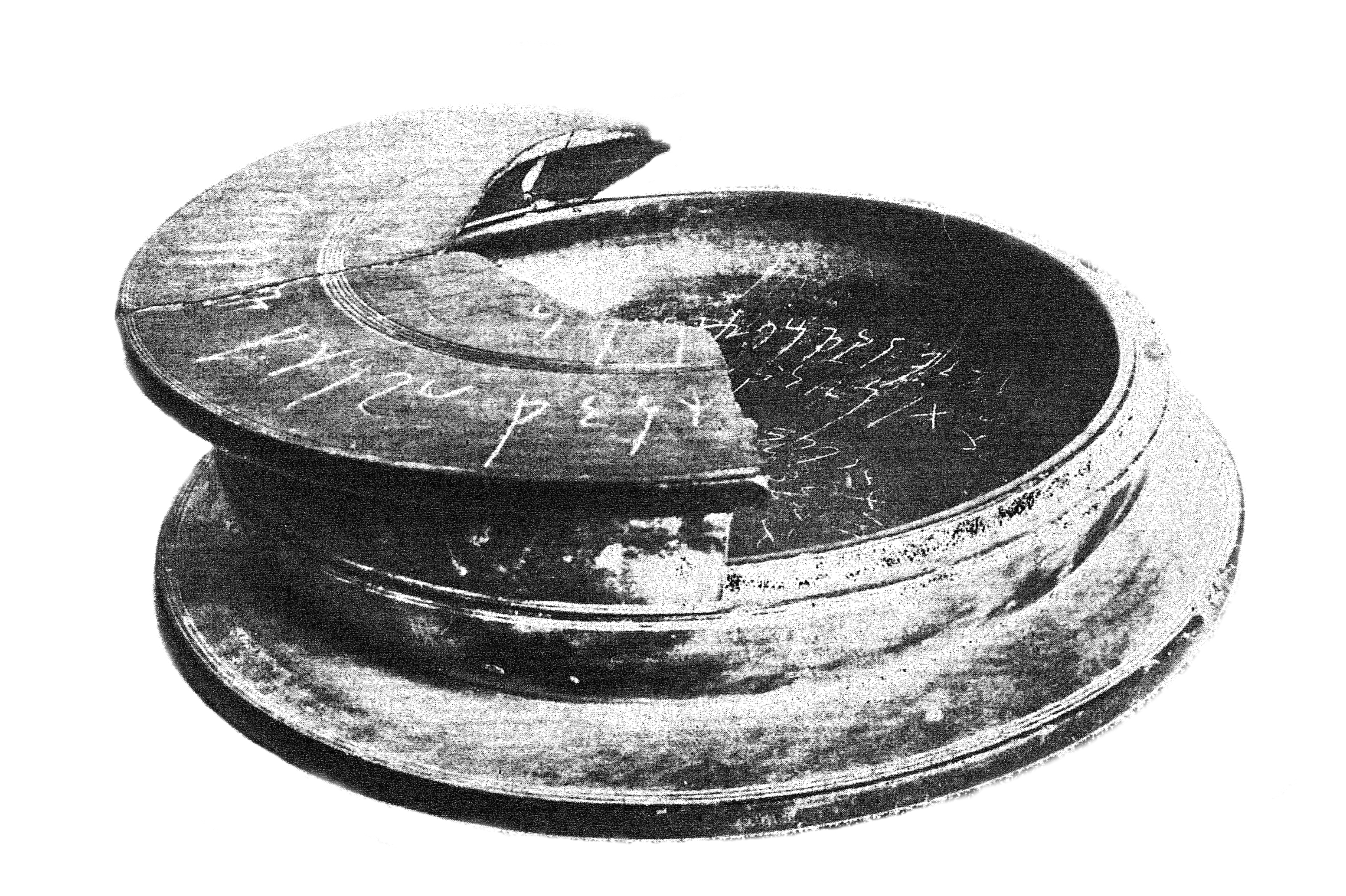
- The Shinkot relic casket. The segment Minadrasa Maharajasa ("Great King Menander") appears on the closest portion of the lid, outer rim.
- Material: Steatite
- Size: Diameter: 28.7 centimeters, 11.3 inches. Height: 8.38 centimeters, 3.3 inches
- Created: 2nd century BCE
- Discovered: Shinkot, Bajaur; 34.66°N 71.5°E

Location
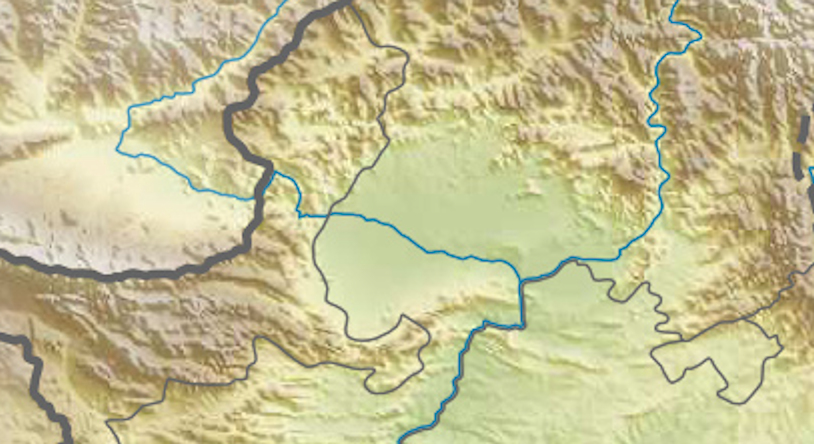

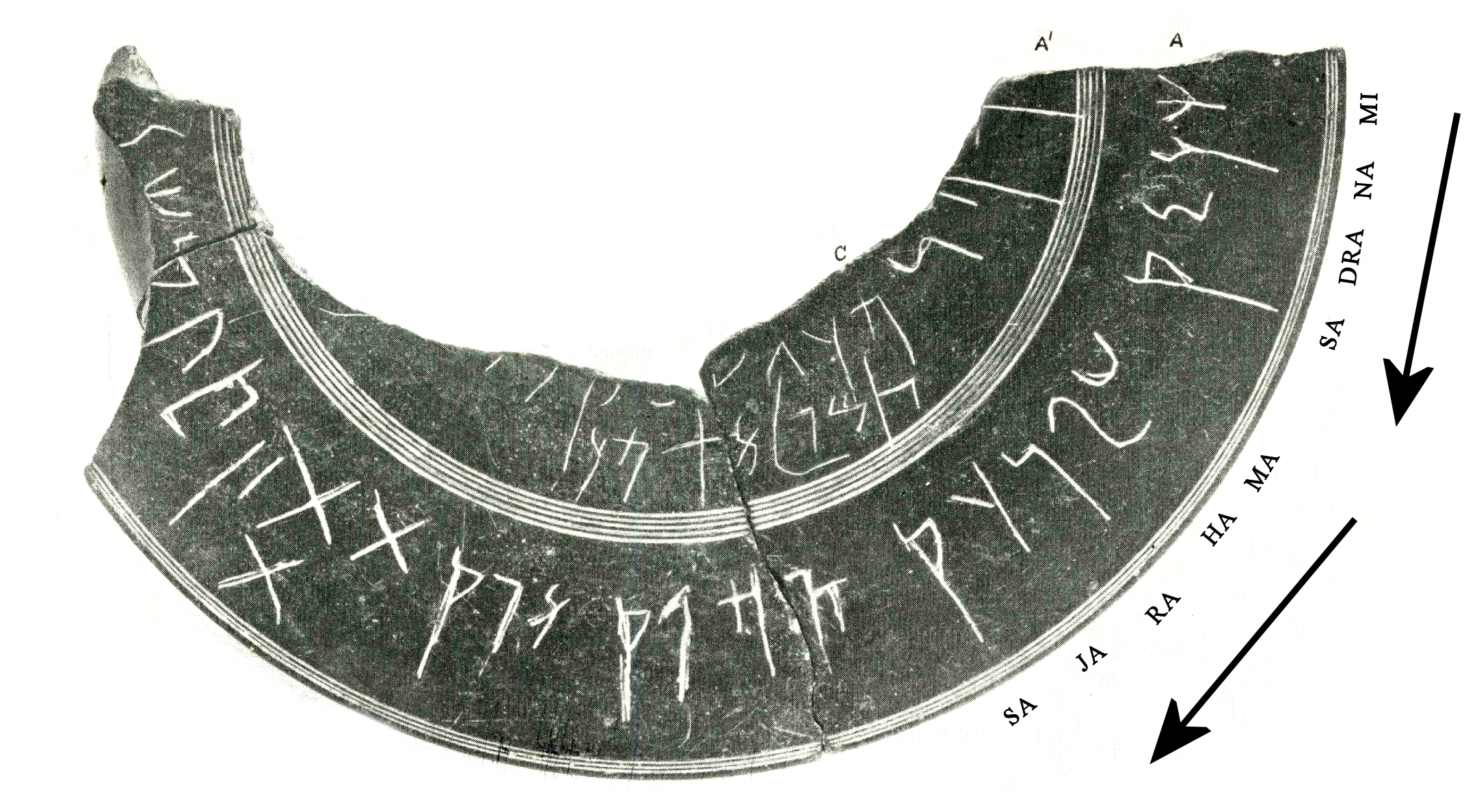
Shinkot casket inscription segments A, A1 and C, and portion with Minadrasa Maharajasa in Kharoshthi script.

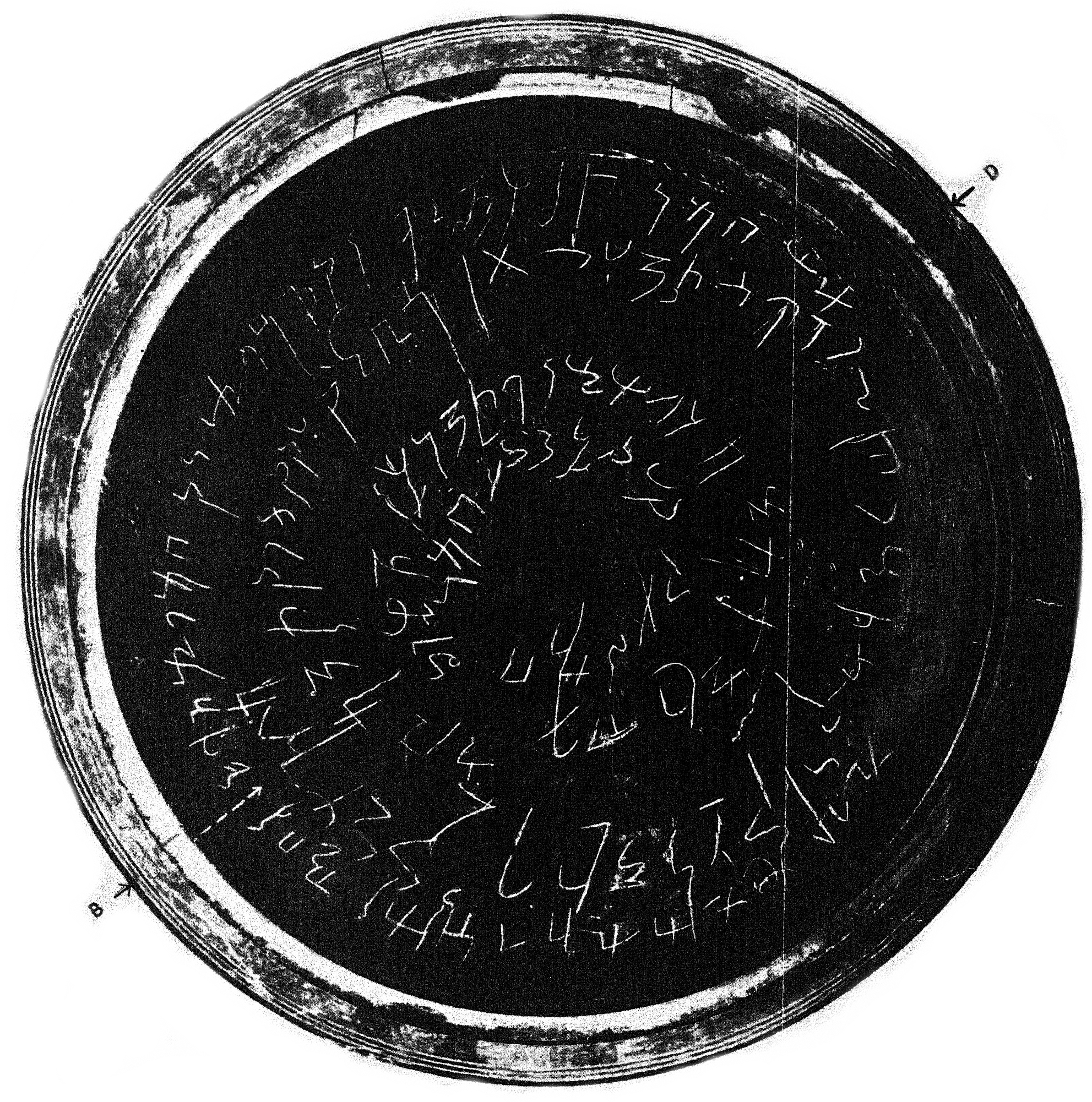
Shinkot casket, inscription segments B and D

The Shinkot casket, also Bajaur reliquary of the reign of Menander, is a Buddhist reliquary from the Bajaur area in Gandhara, thought to mention the reign of the 2nd century BCE Indo-Greek king Menander I. The steatite casket is said to have contained a silver and a gold reliquary at the time of discovery, but they have been lost.

== Inscription ==
This casket is probably the oldest known inscribed Buddhist relic casket from the area of Gandhara. One of its inscriptions, in the place of honour on the lid, mentions: Minedrasa maharajasa kaṭiasa divasa 44411, being translated as "On the 14th day of Kārtikka, in the reign of the Maharaja Minadra", the Maharaja ("Great King") Minadra in question being Menander. Menander is otherwise known from his coins, which are generally bilingual in Greek and Kharoshthi, where his Kharoshthi name is given as Menadra. On his coinage, the full title of king Menander appears as Menadrasa Maharajasa Trataresa "Saviour Great King Menander". In the Milindapanha, his name is given as Milinda.

A translation of the different fragments has been made:

Inscription of the Shinkot casket, Epigraphia Indica, Vol.24
Inscription	Original (Kharosthi script)	Transliteration	English translation	Hellenistic Greek
A	𐨨𐨁𐨣𐨅𐨡𐨿𐨪𐨯 𐨨𐨱𐨪𐨗𐨯 𐨐𐨚𐨁𐨀𐨯 𐨡𐨁𐨬𐨯 𐩃 𐩃 𐩃 𐩀 𐩀 𐨤𐨿𐨪𐨞𐨯𐨨𐨅𐨡 𐨭𐨪𐨁𐨪 𐨧𐨒𐨬𐨟𐨆	Minedrasa maharajasa kaṭiasa divasa 4 4 4 1 1 praṇasameda śarira bagavato	... of Menandros the great king, on the month Kārttika's 14th day, relics of the Lord,	ΚΑΤΑ ΤΗΝ ΔΕΚΑΤΗΝ ΤΕΤΑΡΤΗΝ ΗΜΕΡΑΝ ΤΟΥ ΜΗΝΟΣ ΚΑΡΤΙΚΚΟΥ ΕΠΙ ΤΗΣ ΒΑΣΙΛΕΙΑΣ ΤΟΥ ΜΕΓΑΛΟΥ ΒΑΣΙΛΕΩΣ ΜΕΝΑΝΔΡΟΥ ΤΑ ΛΕΙΨΑΝΑ ΤΟΥ ΚΥΡΙΟΥ
A¹	𐨤𐨿𐨪𐨟𐨁𐨠𐨬𐨁 𐨟 ...	Śakamunisa pratithavi ta	the Śākya sage, were established;	ΤΟΥ ΣΑΚΥΑ ΣΟΦΟΥ ΕΘΕΜΕΛΙΩΘΗ
A²	𐨤𐨿𐨪𐨞𐨯𐨨𐨅𐨡 ... 𐨭𐨐𐨨𐨂𐨣𐨁𐨯	praṇasameda śarira bhagavato Śakamunisa	relics of the Lord, the Śākya sage, that are endowed with life.	ΤΑ ΛΕΙΨΑΝΑ ΤΟΥ ΚΥΡΙΟΥ ΤΟΥ ΣΑΚΥΑ ΣΟΦΟΥ ΖΩΟΠΟΙΟΥΜΕΝΑ
C1	𐨬𐨁𐨗𐨩𐨨𐨁𐨟𐨿𐨪𐨅𐨞	Vijayamitreṇa	By Vijayamitra	ΥΠΟ ΒΙΤΖΑΓΙΑΜΙΤΡΑ
C2	𐨤𐨟𐨅 𐨤𐨿𐨪𐨡𐨁𐨠𐨬𐨁𐨡𐨅	pate pradithavide	this bowl is established.	Η ΚΥΒΩΤΟΣ ΑΥΤΗ ΕΘΕΜΕΛΙΩΘΗ
D1	𐨀𐨁𐨨𐨅 𐨭𐨪𐨁𐨪 𐨤𐨫𐨂𐨒𐨧𐨂𐨟𐨀𐨆 𐨣 𐨯𐨐𐨪𐨅𐨀𐨟𐨁 𐨟𐨯 𐨭𐨪𐨁𐨀𐨟𐨁 𐨐𐨫𐨡𐨅 𐨣 𐨭𐨢𐨿𐨪𐨆 𐨣 𐨤𐨁𐨎𐨜𐨆𐨩 𐨐𐨅 𐨩𐨁 𐨤𐨁𐨟𐨿𐨪𐨁 𐨒𐨿𐨪𐨁𐨞𐨩𐨟𐨁 𐨟𐨯 𐨩𐨅 𐨤𐨟𐨿𐨪𐨅 𐨬𐨤𐨆𐨨𐨂𐨀	ime śarira palughabhutao na sakareati tasa śariati kalade na śadhro na piṃḍoya ke yi pitri griṇayati tasa ye patre vapomua	These relics, having become broken, are not treated with respect. [...] after some time. Nobody provides the funerary ritual nor food nor water to the ancestors. The bowl that belongs to it is barely covered.	ΤΑ ΛΕΙΨΑΝΑ ΤΑΥΤΑ ΚΑΤΑΣΤΡΑΦΕΝΤΑ ΟΥ ΣΕΒΟΝΤΑΙ [...] ΜΕΤΑ ΧΡΟΝΟΝ ΟΥΔΕΙΣ ΠΑΡΕΧΕΙ ΤΑΦΑΣ ΟΥΔΕ ΣΙΤΙΣΙΝ ΟΥΔΕ ΥΔΩΡ ΤΟΙΣ ΠΡΟΓΟΝΟΙΣ. Η ΚΥΒΩΤΟΣ Ἡ ΠΡΟΣ ΑΥΤΑ ΜΟΛΙΣ ΚΑΛΥΠΤΕΤΑΙ
B	𐨬𐨁𐨩𐨐𐨨𐨁𐨟𐨿𐨪 𐨀𐨤𐨿𐨪𐨕𐨪𐨗𐨯	Viyakamitra Apracarajasa	Of Vijayamitra, king of Apraca,	Ο ΒΙΤΖΑΓΙΑΜΙΤΡΑ, ΒΑΣΙΛΕΥΣ ΤΗΣ ΑΠΡΑΚΑΣ
D2	𐨬𐨮𐨩𐨅 𐨤𐨎𐨕𐨨𐨩𐨅 𐩃 𐩀 𐨬𐨅𐨭𐨑𐨯 𐨨𐨯𐨯 𐨡𐨁𐨬𐨯 𐨤𐨎𐨕𐨬𐨁𐨭𐨩𐨅 𐨀𐨁𐨩𐨆	vaṣaye paṃcamaye 4 1 veśakhasa masasa divasa paṃcaviśaye iyo	in the fifth - 5 - year, on the 25th day of the month Vaiśākha,	ΕΝ ΤΩ ΠΕΜΠΤΩ ΕΤΕΙ ΤΗ ΕΙΚΑΔΙ ΚΑΙ ΠΕΜΠΤΗ ΤΟΥ ΜΗΝΟΣ ΒΕΣΑΚΧΑ
D3	𐨤𐨿𐨪𐨟𐨁𐨠𐨬𐨁𐨟𐨅 𐨬𐨁𐨗𐨩𐨨𐨁𐨟𐨿𐨪𐨅𐨣 𐨀𐨤𐨿𐨪𐨕𐨪𐨗𐨅𐨣 𐨧𐨒𐨬𐨟𐨂 𐨭𐨐𐨁𐨨𐨂𐨞𐨁𐨯 𐨯𐨨𐨯𐨦𐨂𐨢𐨯 𐨭𐨪𐨁𐨪	pratithavite Vijayamitrena Apracarajena bhagavatu Śakimuṇisa samasabudhasa śarira	is established by Vijayamitra, king of Apraca, this relic of the Śākya sage, the completely enlightened one.	ΕΘΕΜΕΛΙΩΘΗ ΥΠΟ ΒΙΤΖΑΓΙΑΜΙΤΡΑ, ΒΑΣΙΛΕΩΣ ΤΗΣ ΑΠΡΑΚΑΣ, ΤΟΥΤΟ ΤΟ ΛΕΙΨΑΝΟΝ ΤΟΥ ΣΑΚΥΑ ΣΟΦΟΥ ΤΟΥ ΤΕΛΕΙΩΣ ΠΕΦΩΤΙΣΜΕΝΟΥ
E	𐨬𐨁𐨭𐨿𐨤𐨁𐨫𐨅𐨣 𐨀𐨞𐨎𐨐𐨩𐨅𐨞	Viśpilena aṇaṃkayeṇa likhite	Written by Viśpilena, the [...].	ΓΡΑΦΕΙΣΑ ΥΠΟ ΒΙΣΠΙΛΕΝΑ, ΤΟΥ [...]

The characters are very clear and without ambiguity. The "Great King Menander" segment (𐨨𐨁𐨣𐨡𐨿𐨪𐨯 𐨨𐨱𐨪𐨗𐨯, Minadrasa Maharajasa) also reads clearly. Paleographically, the shape of the letters of inscriptions C and D correspond to the period of the Indo-Scythian Northern Satraps of Taxila and Mathura in the 1st century BCE, and are lightly incised, almost only scratched, while the letters in A and B are characteristic of an earlier type, closer to the type of the Ashoka inscriptions in the Kharoshthi script, and are bold and deeply incised.

The later segments of the inscription were apparently made under the orders of Vijayamitra, king of the Apracarajas (ruled 12 BCE - 15 CE). He appears in D as Vijayamitra apracarajena, which, previously translated literally as "Vijayamitra, the King without adversaries", is now understood as "Vijayamitra, the King of the Apracas", an Indo-Scythian tribe now known from other archaeological remains from the region of Bajaur.

The authenticity of the inscription pertaining to Menander has been doubted by Harry Falk in 2005, but later upheld by Stefan Baums in his 2017 article on Gandharan inscriptions, "A framework for Gandharan chronology based on relic inscriptions".

The content of the inscriptions was fully published in 1937 in Epigraphia Indica, Vol.24, by Majumdar, who saw the casket in Calcutta, but its whereabouts are now unknown.

== See also ==
- Bimaran casket

== Sources ==
- Baums, Stefan (2017). A framework for Gandharan chronology based on relic inscriptions, in "Problems of Chronology in Gandharan Art". Archaeopress.
- Chakravarti, N. P (1937). Epigraphia Indica Vol.24. pp. 1–10.
- Falk, Harry (2007). "Ancient Indian Eras: An Overview". Bulletin of the Asia Institute. 21: 137. JSTOR 24049367.
