= Kalliope (queen) =

Indo-Greek queen and wife of Hermaeus

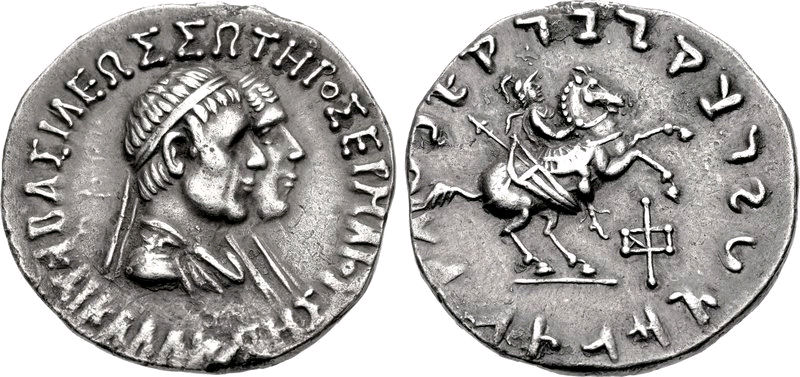
Coin of Hermaeus and Kalliope. Obverse shows the king and queen, with the Greek legend: BAΣIΛEΩΣ ΣΩTHPOΣ EPMAIOY KAI KAΛΛIOΠHΣ, Basileōs Sōtēros Hermaiou kai Kalliopēs, "(of) Saviour King Hermaeus and Kalliope". Reverse shows Hermaeus on horseback and with Kharosthi script: Maharajasa Tratarasa Heramayasa Kaliyapaya.

Kalliope (Ancient Greek: Καλλιόπη, Kalliópē, meaning "beautiful-voiced") was an Indo-Greek queen and wife of Hermaeus, who was a Western Indo-Greek king of the Eucratid Dynasty. Hermaeus ruled the territory of Paropamisade in the Hindu-Kush region, with his capital in Alexandria of the Caucasus (near today's Kabul, Afghanistan). Their reign dates from the first quarter of the first century BC.

== Coinage ==
Kalliope and Hermaeus jointly issued silver, Indian-Standard Drachms. The obverse featured diademed and draped busts of them both. The reverse shows the king on a prancing horse, which is characteristic motif of the contemporary Greek kings in the eastern Punjab such as Hippostratos. It has been suggested that the coin represented a marital alliance between the two dynastic lines. Coins have been found in Peshawar and near Mohmand. They were also part of the assemblage of the Sarai Saleh hoard and 928 were found in the first Mir Zakah deposit. Some of these coins are found overstruck with dies in the name of Artemidoros. The depiction of the wife on Indo-Greek coins is otherwise not common, so that it can be assumed that Calliope played a special role (perhaps in the marriage policy of the Indo-Greek states).

== Historiography ==
Whilst Kalliope has been referred to as Hermaeus' wife by W. W. Tarn and A K Narain, S K Dikshit suggested that Kalliope appeared older in her portrait and as such perhaps was Hermaeus' mother.
