= Hermaeus =

Indo-Greek king (1st century BC)

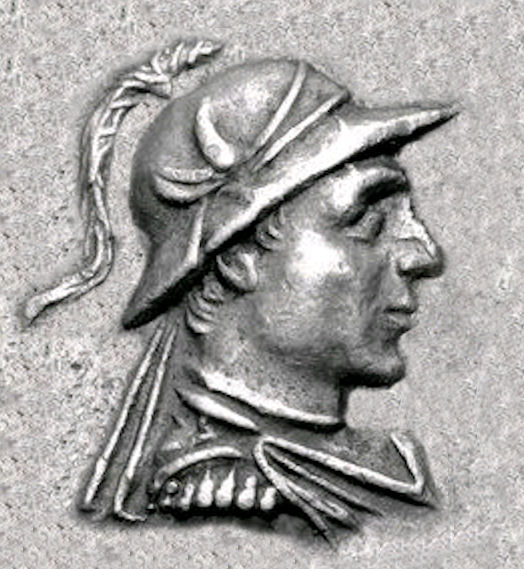
- Profile of Hermaeus

Indo-Greek king
- Reign: 90–70 BC
- Consort: Kalliope

Hermaeus Soter (Ancient Greek: Ἑρμαῖος ὁ Σωτήρ, Hermaîos ho Sōtḗr, meaning "Hermaeus the Saviour") was a Western Indo-Greek king of the Eucratid dynasty, who ruled the territory of Paropamisadae in the Hindu-Kush region, with his capital in Alexandria of the Caucasus (near today's Kabul, Afghanistan). Bopearachchi dates Hermaeus to c. 90–70 BC and R. C. Senior to c. 95–80 BC.

== Biography ==
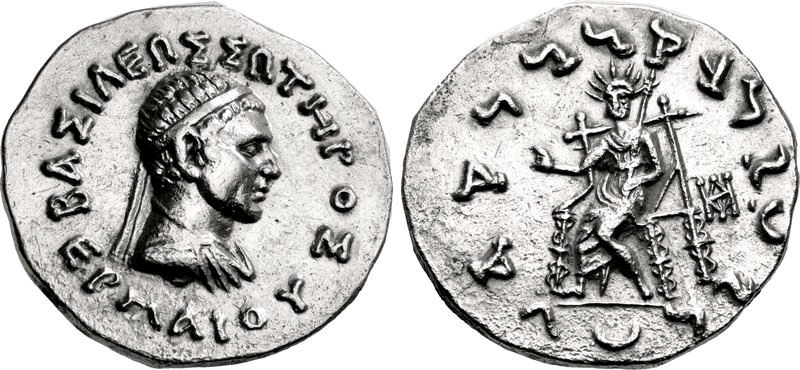
Coin of Hermaeus wearing a royal diadem, with Greek legend: ΒΑΣΙΛΕΩΣ ΣΩΤΗΡΟΣ ΕΡΜΑΙΟΥ, Basileōs Sōtēros Hermaiou, "(of) Saviour King Hermaeus". The reverse shows radiate Zeus making a blessing gesture, and with Kharoshti legend: Maharajasa Tratarasa Heramayasa, "(of) Great Saviour King Hermaeus".

Hermaeus' name means "devoted to Hermes", and he seems to have been the successor of Philoxenus or Diomedes, and his wife Kalliope (Greek: Καλλιόπη) may have been a daughter of Philoxenus, according to Senior. Judging from his coins, Hermaeus' rule was long and prosperous, but came to an end when the Yuezhi, coming from neighbouring Bactria, overran most of his Greek kingdom in the Paropamisade around 70 BC. According to Bopearachchi, these nomads were the Yuezhi, the ancestors of the Kushans, whereas Senior considers them Sakas.

Kushan ruler Kujula Kadphises associated himself to Hermaeus on his coins, either in attempt to solidify legitimacy or due to the difficulties minting early coins. In any case, the Yuezhi-Kushans preserved a close cultural interaction with the Greeks as late as the 3rd century CE.

Given the importance of Hermaeus to the nomad rulers, it is possible that Hermaeus himself was partially of nomad origin.

== Coins of Hermaeus ==
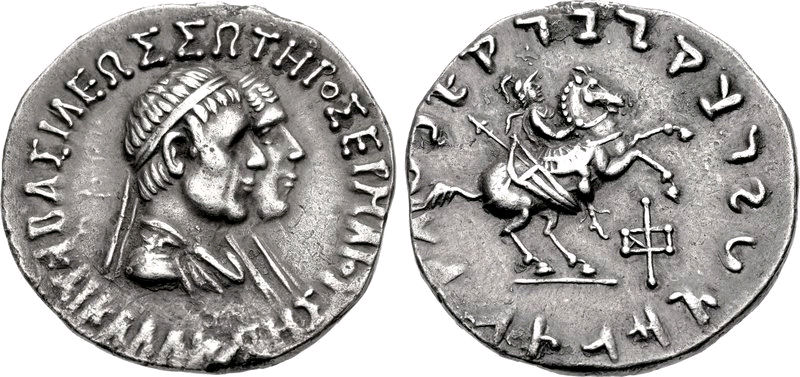
Coin of Hermaeus and Kalliope, Greek legend on the obverse reads: BAΣIΛEΩΣ ΣΩTHPOΣ EPMAIOY KAI KAΛΛIOΠHΣ, Basileōs Sōtēros Hermaiou kai Kalliopēs, "(of) Saviour King Hermaeus and Kalliope". Reverse shows Hermaeus on horseback and with Kharoshti script: Maharajasa Tratarasa Heramayasa Kaliyapaya.

Hermaeus issued Indian silver coins of three types. The first type has a diademed or sometimes helmeted portrait, with reverse of sitting Zeus making benediction gesture. Hermaeus also issued a rare series of Attic silver tetradrachms of this type, which were issued for export to Bactria.

The second type was a joint series of Hermaeus with his queen Kalliope. The reverse departs from the traditional Hermaeus format, in that it shows the king on a prancing horse. The "king on a prancing horse" is characteristic of the contemporary Greek kings in the eastern Punjab such as Hippostratos, and it has been suggested that the coin represented a marital alliance between the two dynastic lines. The horseman on Hermaeus' version is however portrayed somewhat different, being equipped with a typical Scythian longbow.

The third series combined the reverses of the first series, without portrait.

Hermaeus also issued bronze coins with the head of Zeus-Mithras and a prancing horse on the reverse.

== Contacts with China ==
A Chinese historical record from the Hanshu Chap. 96A could possible be related to Hermaeus, even though this is very speculative and the record more likely refers to later Saka kings. The chronicle tells how a king who may possibly be identified as Hermaeus received the support of the Chinese against Indo-Scythian occupants, and may explain why his kingdom was suddenly so prosperous despite the general decline of the Indo-Greeks during the period. The Chinese records would put Hermaeus's dates later, with his reign ending around 40 BC.

According to the Hanshu, Chap. 96A, Wutoulao (Spalirises?), king of Jibin (Kophen, upper Kabul Valley), killed some Chinese envoys. After the death of the king, his son (Spaladagames) sent an envoy to China with gifts. The Chinese general Wen Zhong, commander of the border area in western Gansu, accompanied the escort back. Wutoulao's son plotted to kill Wen Zhong. When Wen Zhong discovered the plot, he allied himself with Yinmofu (Hermaeus?), "son of the king of Rongqu" (Yonaka, the Greeks). They attacked Jibin (possibly with the support of the Yuezhi, themselves allies of the Chinese since around 100 BC according to the Hanshu) and killed Wutoulao's son. Yinmofu (Hermaeus?) was then installed as king of Jibin, as a vassal of the Chinese Empire, and receiving the Chinese seal and ribbon of investiture.

Later Yinmofu (Hermaeus?) himself is recorded to have killed Chinese envoys in the reign of Emperor Yuandi (48–33 BC), then sent envoys to apologize to the Chinese court, but he was disregarded. During the reign of Emperor Chengdi (51–7 BC) other envoys were sent, but they were rejected as simple traders. According to Lucas Christopoulos, Wutoulao (烏頭勞)was in fact Apollodotes (180-160 BC), the Indo-Greek king. According to the author, Hermaeus had allied with the Yuezhi, and then attacked and killed Apollodotes II to gain control of the region of Gandhara.

== Imitations by Indo-Scythian and Yuezhi invaders ==
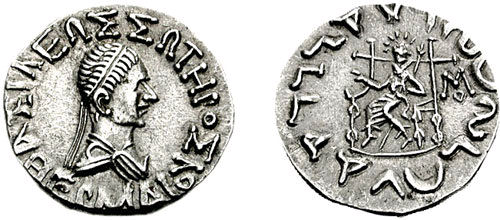
Hermaeus posthumous issue struck by Indo-Scythians near Kabul, c. 80–75 BC.

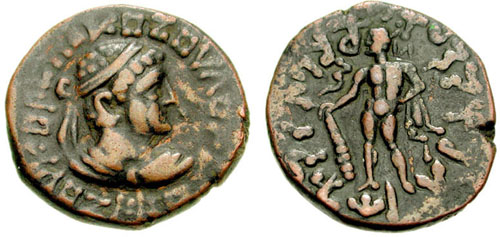
Tetradrachm of Kujula Kadphises (c. 30-80 CE) in the style of Hermaeus. Obverse with Hermaeus-style diademed bust. Corrupted Greek legend: ΒΑΣΙΛΕΩΣ ΣΤΗΡΟΣΣΥ ΕΡΜΑΙΟΥ, "(of) Saviour King Hermaeus". Reverse with Heracles standing with club and lion skin. Kharoṣṭhī legend reads: "Kujula Kadphises ruler of the Kushans, steadfast in the Law ("Dharma"). British Museum.

These events may have initiated an alliance between the Greeks and the Yuezhi (even possibly a dynastic alliance), explaining why the Yuezhi gained pre-eminence after the reign of Hermaeus. However the Yuezhi invaders imitated Hermaeus' coinage style possibly after taking over his kingdom, thereby depicting themselves as his successors. The early Kushan ruler Heraios even imitated Hermaeus' name on his coins but misspelled it by leaving out the letter 'M'. Therefore the name Heraios is a corrupted version of Hermaios. The first true Kushan emperor Kujula Kadphises associated himself with Hermaeus on his coins, but it is also possible that this ruler was identical to the aforementioned Heraios.

== Gallery of coinage ==
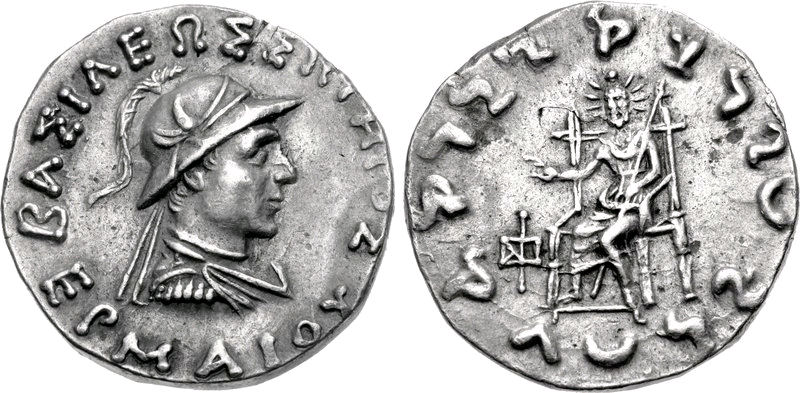
Silver coin of Hermaeus with obverse showing king wearing a Bactrian helmet. Reverse showing radiate Zeus making a blessing gesture.

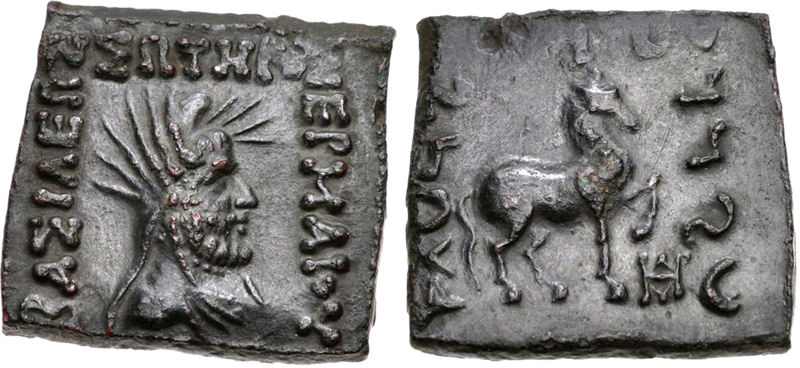
Indian standard square coin of Hermaeus. Obverse with the head of radiate Zeus-Mithra. Reverse shows a standing horse.

	Greco-Bactrian kings		Indo-Greek kings					
Territories/ dates	West Bactria	East Bactria	Paropamisade	Arachosia	Gandhara	Western Punjab	Eastern Punjab	Mathura
326-325 BCE	Campaigns of Alexander the Great in India						Nanda Empire	
312 BCE	Creation of the Seleucid Empire						Creation of the Maurya Empire	
305 BCE	Seleucid Empire after Mauryan war		Maurya Empire					
280 BCE	Foundation of Ai-Khanoum							
255–239 BCE	Independence of the Greco-Bactrian kingdom Diodotus I		Emperor Ashoka (268-232 BCE)					
239–223 BCE	Diodotus II							
230–200 BCE	Euthydemus I							
200–190 BCE	Demetrius I				Sunga Empire			
190-185 BCE	Euthydemus II							
190–180 BCE	Agathocles			Pantaleon				
185–170 BCE	Antimachus I							
180–160 BCE			Apollodotus I					
175–170 BCE	Demetrius II							
160–155 BCE			Antimachus II					
170–145 BCE	Eucratides I							
155–130 BCE	Yuezhi occupation, loss of Ai-Khanoum	Eucratides II; Plato; Heliocles I	Menander I					
130–120 BCE	Yuezhi occupation		Zoilus I		Agathoclea			Yavanarajya inscription
120–110 BCE			Lysias		Strato I			Yavanarajya inscription
110–100 BCE			Antialcidas		Heliocles II			Yavanarajya inscription
100 BCE			Polyxenus		Demetrius III			Yavanarajya inscription
100–95 BCE			Philoxenus					Yavanarajya inscription
95–90 BCE			Diomedes	Amyntas		Epander		Yavanarajya inscription
90 BCE			Theophilus	Peucolaus		Thraso		Yavanarajya inscription
90–85 BCE			Nicias	Menander II		Artemidorus		Yavanarajya inscription
90–70 BCE			Hermaeus	Archebius				Yavanarajya inscription
			Yuezhi occupation		Maues (Indo-Scythian)			
75–70 BCE				Vonones	Telephus	Apollodotus II		
65–55 BCE				Spalirises		Hippostratus	Dionysius	
55–35 BCE					Azes I (Indo-Scythians)		Zoilus II	
55–35 BCE					Vijayamitra/ Azilises		Apollophanes	
25 BCE – 10 CE				Gondophares	Zeionises	Kharahostes	Strato II; Strato III	
				Gondophares (Indo-Parthian)			Rajuvula (Indo-Scythian)	
			Kujula Kadphises (Kushan Empire)				Bhadayasa (Indo-Scythian)	Sodasa (Indo-Scythian)

== See also ==
- Greco-Bactrian Kingdom
- Seleucid Empire
- Greco-Buddhism
- Indo-Scythians
- Indo-Parthian Kingdom
- Kushan Empire

== Sources ==
- The Greeks in Bactria and India, W. W. Tarn, Cambridge University Press.
- The Coin Types of the Indo-Greek Kings, 256-54 B.C., A. K. Narain
- China in Central Asia, the Early Stage: 125 B.C.-A.D. 23: an annotated translation of chapters 61 and 96 of the History of the Former Han Dynasty, A. F. P. Hulsewé, and M. A. N. Loewe, 1979. Leiden: E. J. Brill.

Preceded by Nicias	Indo-Greek Ruler (in Paropamisade); 90 – 70 BC	Succeeded by Yuezhi rulers
