= Catherine Stratakis =

Greek footballer

Personal information
- Date of birth: 12 September 1978 (age 48)
- Place of birth: Elmont, New York, U.S.
- Position: Defender

College career
Years	Team	Apps	(Gls)
1998–2000	Southern Connecticut Owls		

Senior career*
Years	Team	Apps	(Gls)
2004	Ergotelis		

International career
2004	Greece	32 (?)	(0)
- * Club domestic league appearances and goals

Catherine "Beba" Stratakis (born 12 September 1978), known in Greece as Kalliopi Stratakis (Greek: Καλλιόπη Στρατάκη), is an American-born Greek former footballer who played as a defender. She has been a member of the Greece women's national team.

== College career ==
Stratakis attended the Southern Connecticut State University in New Haven, Connecticut.

== Club career ==
Stratakis played for Ergotelis.

== International career ==
Stratakis played for Greece at senior level in the 2004 Summer Olympics.

== See also ==
- Greece at the 2004 Summer Olympics
