= Alexandria in the Caucasus =

Colony of Alexander the Great on the Hindu-Kush mountains

- Ἀλεξάνδρεια (Ancient Greek)
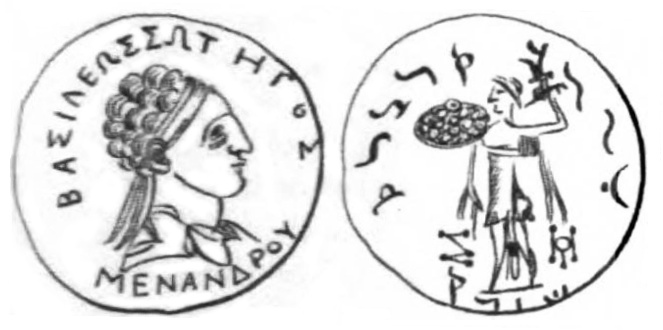
- Menander I coin

- Location within Afghanistan
- 34°59′45″N 69°18′39″E
- Type: Settlement
- Location: Afghanistan
- Region: Parwan Province

History
- Built by: Alexander the Great

Alexandria in the Caucasus (Ancient Greek: Ἀλεξάνδρεια Alexándreia; medieval Kapisa, modern Bagram) was a colony of Alexander the Great. It was one of many colonies designated with the name "Alexandria". He founded the colony at an important junction of communications in the southern foothills of the Hindu Kush mountains, in the country of the Paropamisadae.

In Classical times, the Hindu Kush mountains were also designated as the "Caucasus", specifically as "Caucasus Indicus" (Ancient Greek: Καύκασος Ινδικός) in parallel to their Western equivalent, the Caucasus Mountains between Europe and Asia.

== Alexander the Great ==
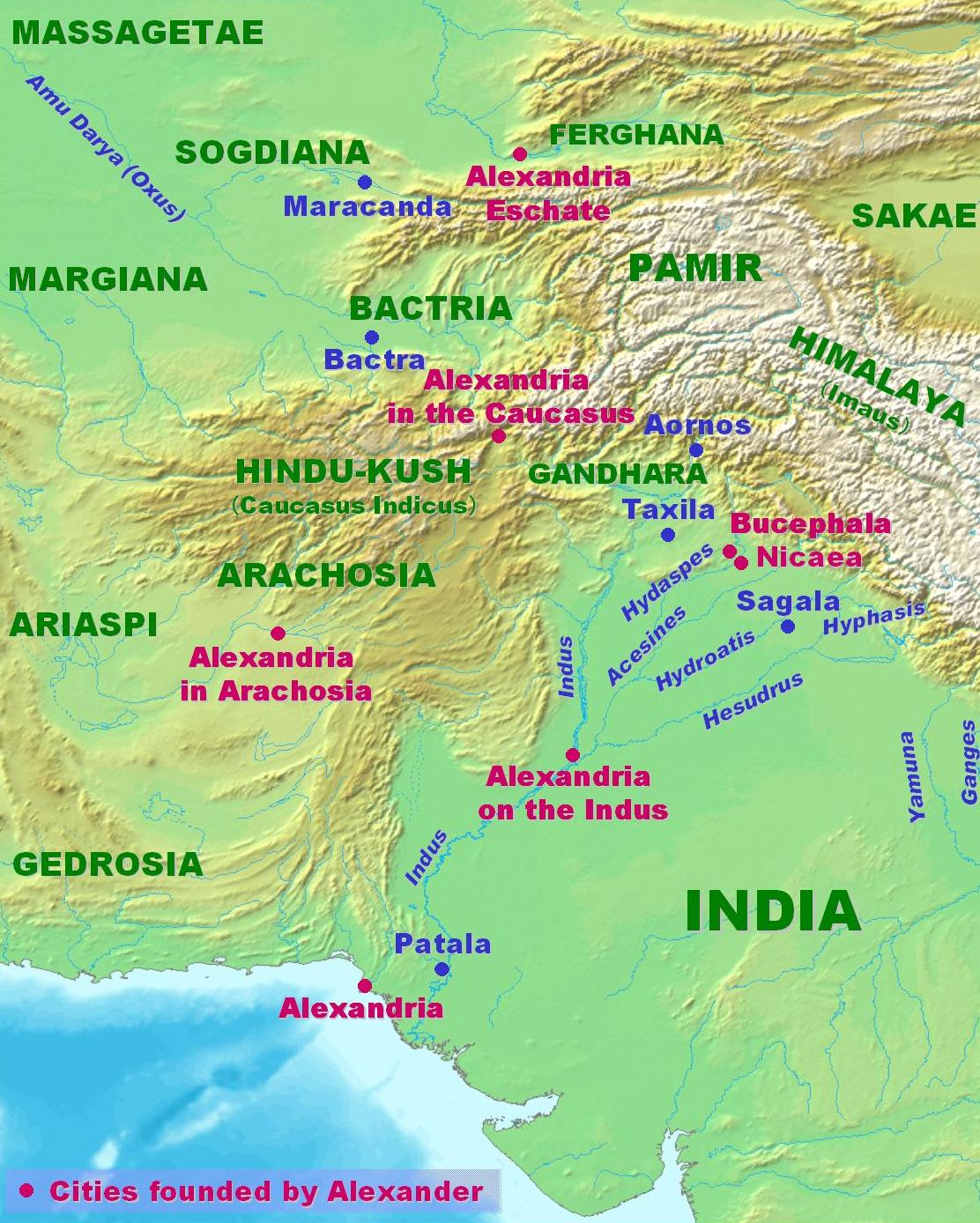
Ancient cities founded by Alexander the Great in Central and South Asia

Alexander populated the city with 7,000 Macedonians, 3,000 mercenaries and thousands of natives (according to Curtius VII.3.23), or some 7,000 natives and 3,000 non-military camp followers and a number of Greek mercenaries (Diodorus, XVII.83.2), in March 329 BC. He had also built forts in what is now Bagram, Afghanistan, at the foot of the Hindu Kush, replacing forts erected in much the same place by Persia's king Cyrus the Great c. 500 BC, Alexandria being in fact a refoundation of an Achaemenid settlement called Kapisa.

The deity of the city seems to have been Zeus, as suggested by coins of the Greco-Bactrian king Eucratides.

== Indo-Greek capital ==
Alexandria of the Caucasus was one of the capitals of the Indo-Greek kings (180 BC – AD 10). For example, it was ruled by the king Hermaeus who is particularly associated with the city.

During the reign of Menander I the city was recorded as having a thriving Buddhist community, headed by Greek monks. The epic Sri Lankan poem Mahāvaṃsa mentions the Greek (Pali: Yona, lit: "Ionian") Buddhist monk Mahadhammarakkhita (Sanskrit: Mahadharmaraksita), who is said to have come from “Alasandra” (thought to be Alexandria of the Caucasus), with 30,000 monks for the foundation ceremony of the Maha Thupa at Anuradhapura in Sri Lanka:

From Alasanda the city of the Yonas came the thera (elder) Yona Mahadhammarakkhita with thirty thousand bhikkhus.

== Archaeology ==
Some archaeological evidence concerning Alexandria of the Caucasus was gathered by Charles Masson (1800–1853), providing insight into the history of that lost city. His findings include coins, rings, seals and other small objects. In the 1930s Roman Ghirshman, while conducting excavations near Bagram, found Egyptian and Syrian glassware, bronze statuettes, bowls, the Begram ivories and other objects including statues. This is an indication that Alexander's conquests opened India to imports from the west.

Today the cities' remains feature a rectangular tell 500 by 200 metres in area and a nearby circular citadel about 3km northeast of Bagram Airforce base. The tell lies beside the main road north and has been slightly damaged due to shelling during Afghan War of the 21st century.

== Gallery ==
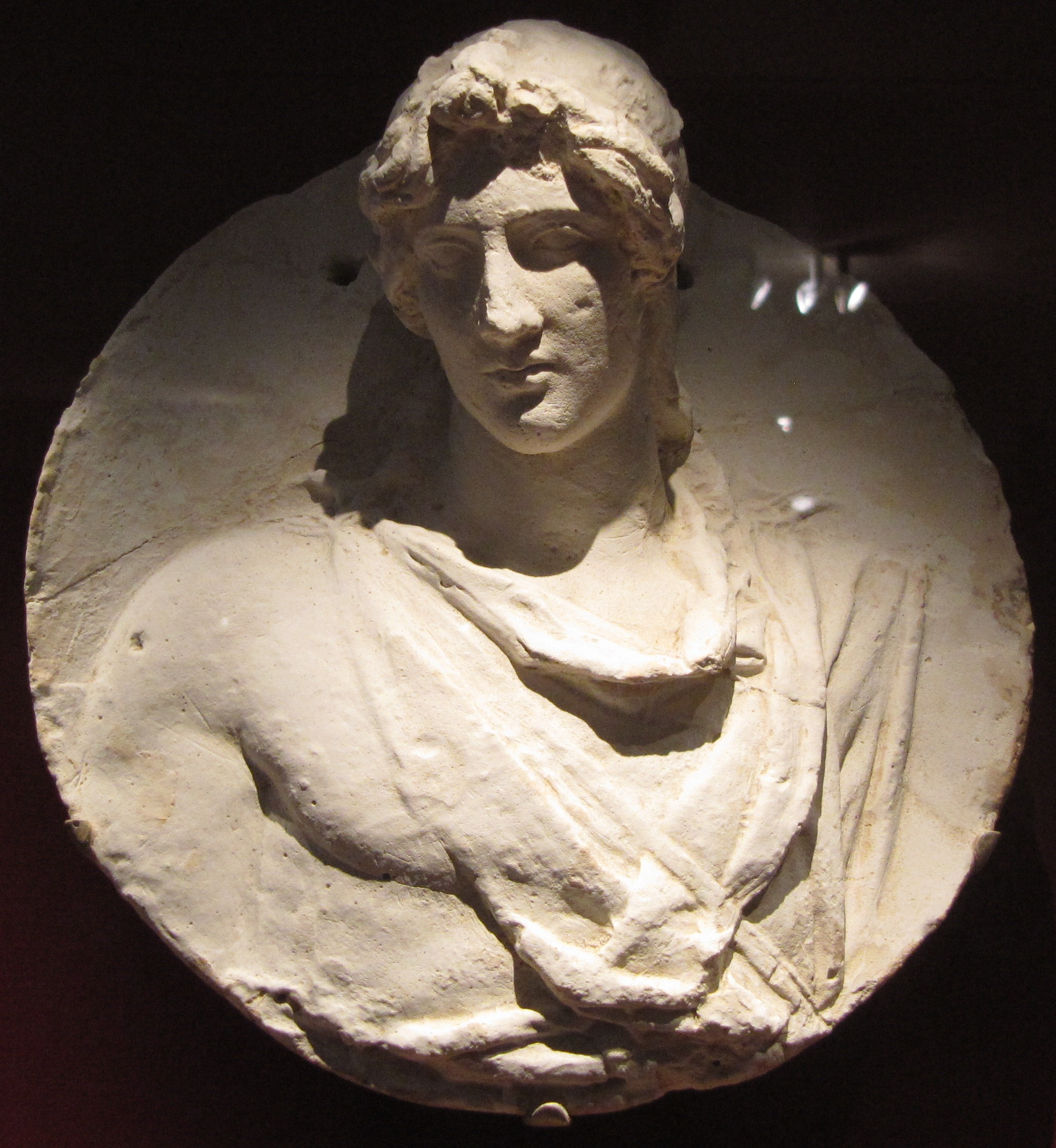
Begram medallion showing a young man wearing a chlamys; c. 1st century AD.

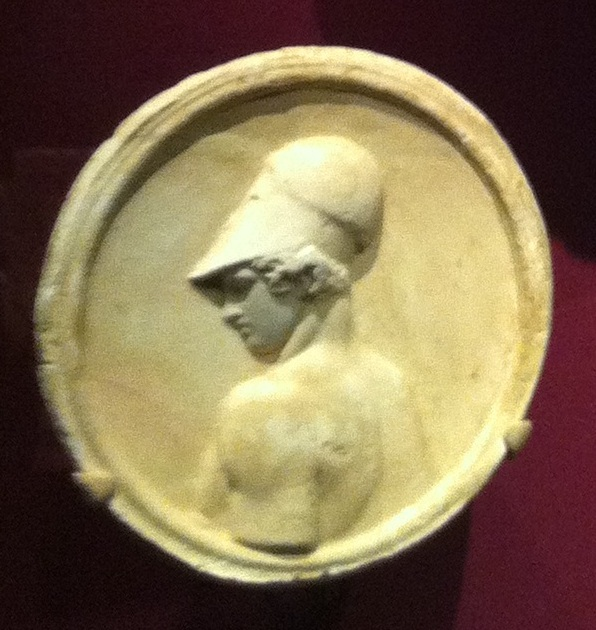
Begram medallion depicting a Greek soldier wearing a Corinthian helmet; c. 1st century AD.

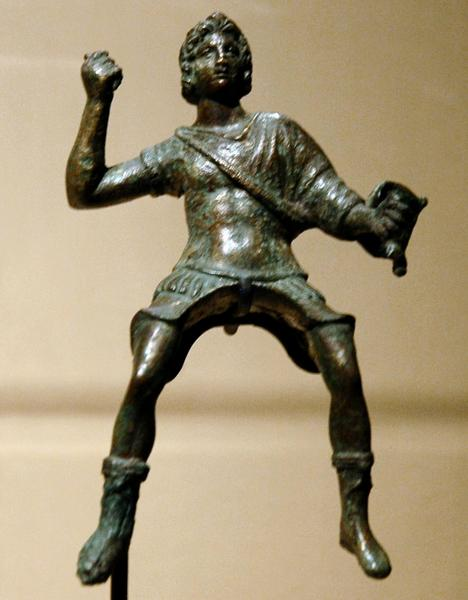
Bronze statuette of Alexander the Great, from Begram.

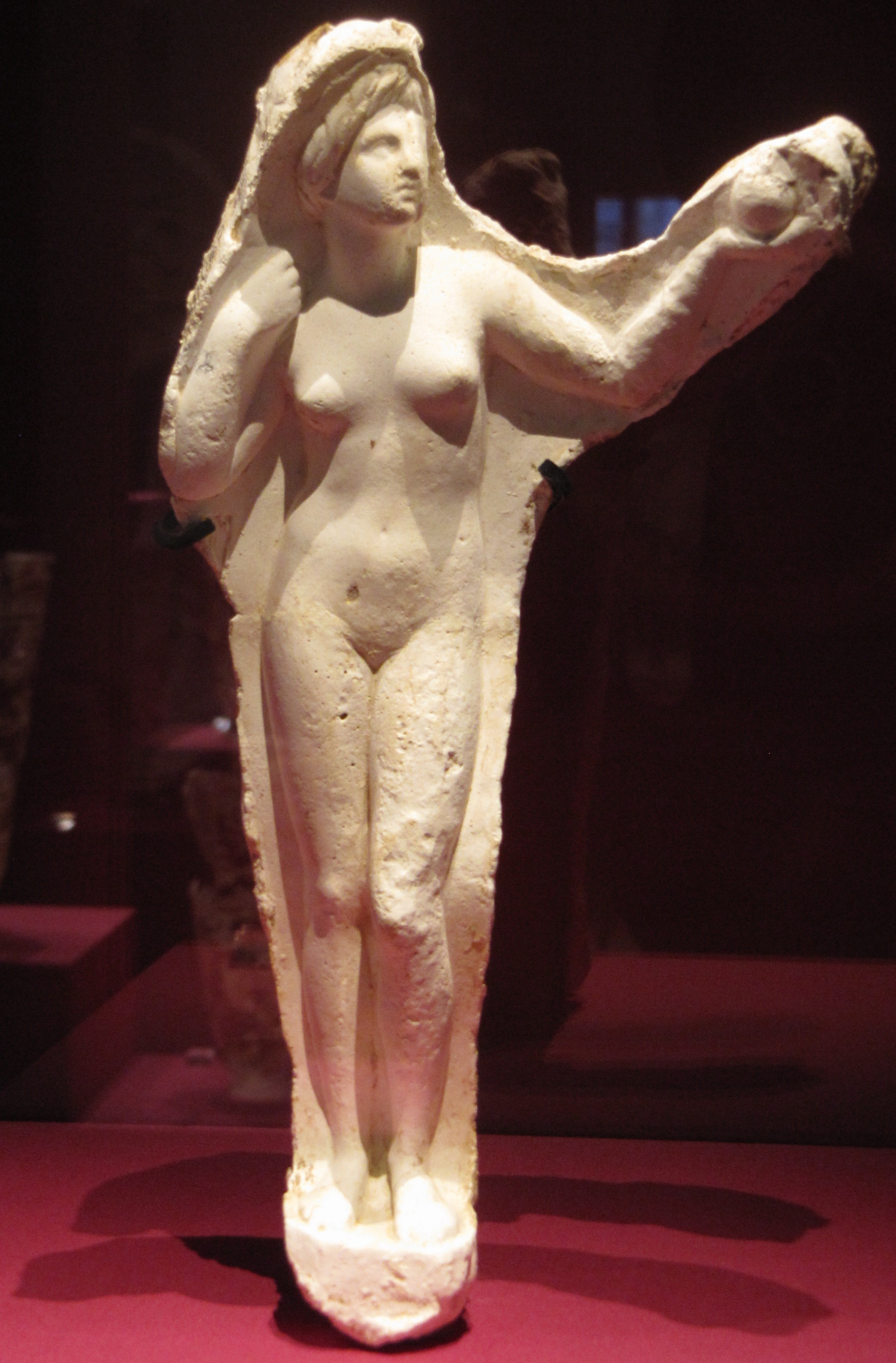
Aphrodite sculpture from Begram, c. 1st century AD, Plaster, National Museum of Afghanistan.

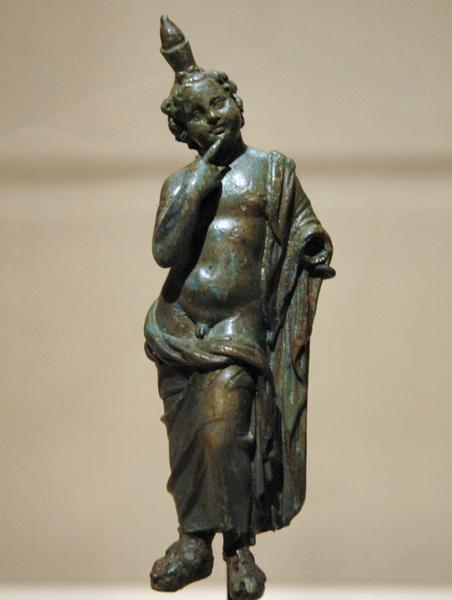
Bronze statuette of Harpocrates from Begram, 1-2nd century AD. Musée Guimet, Paris.

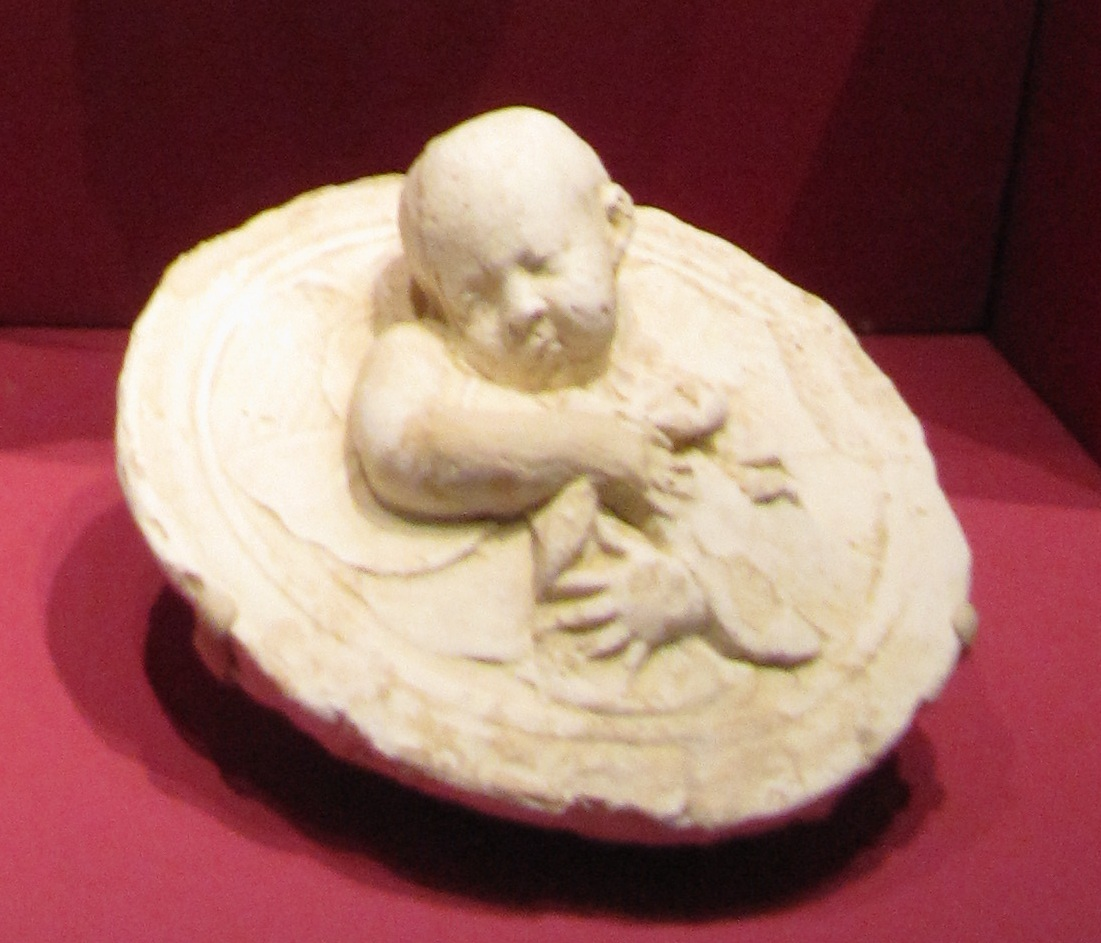
Begram medallion with Eros and Psyche; c. 1st century AD.

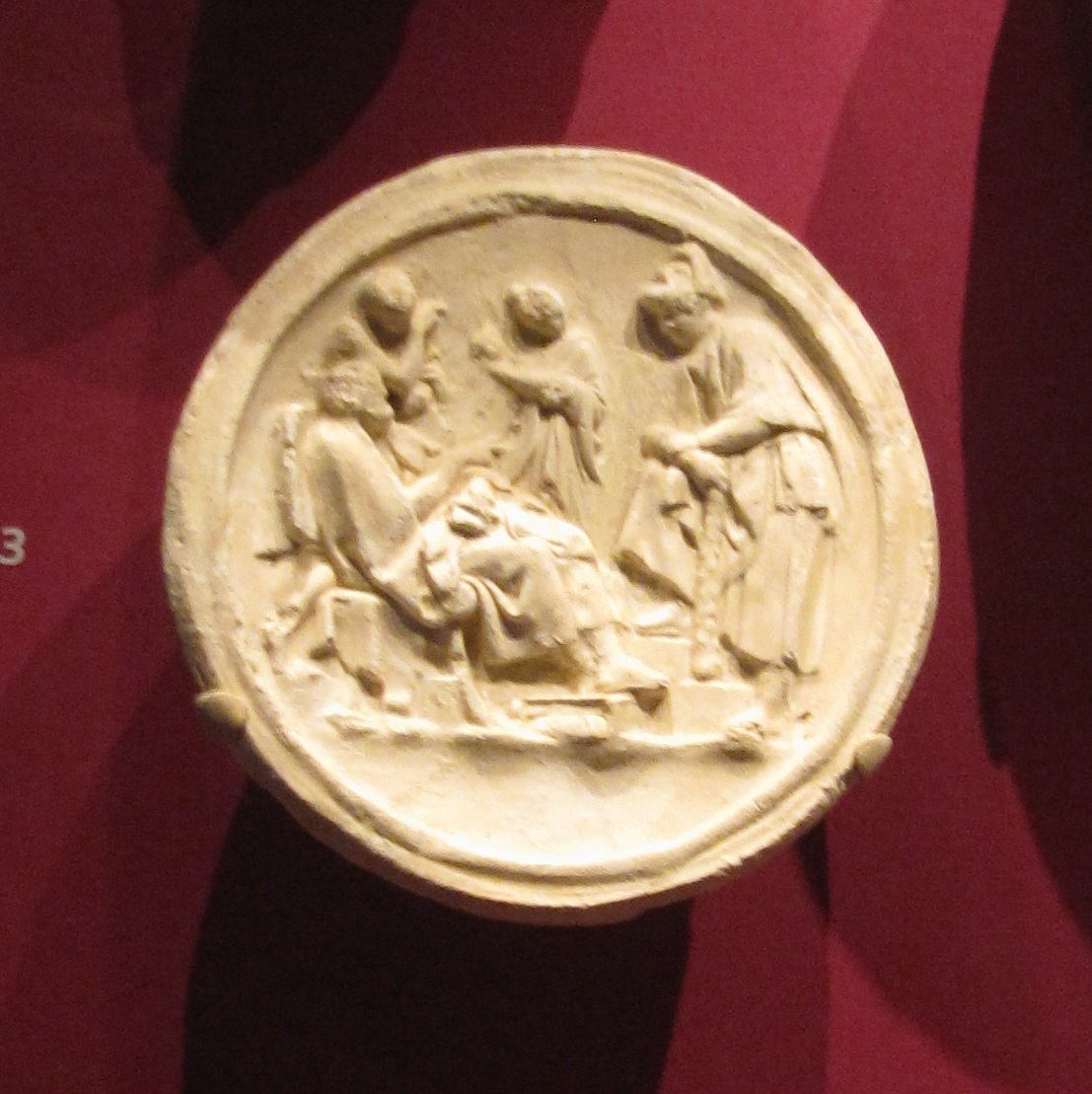
Begram medallion, c. 1st century AD.

== See also ==
- List of cities founded by Alexander the Great
