= SS Kalliope =

A number of steamships have been named Kalliope, including:

- SS Kalliope (1914), a cargo ship in service 1914–21
- SS Kalliope (1944), a Hansa A Type cargo ship in service 1944–45
