= Indo-Scythian Kingdom =

Nomadic Iranian peoples of Saka and Scythian origin

Indo-Scythian kingdom
- c. 150 BCE–400 CE
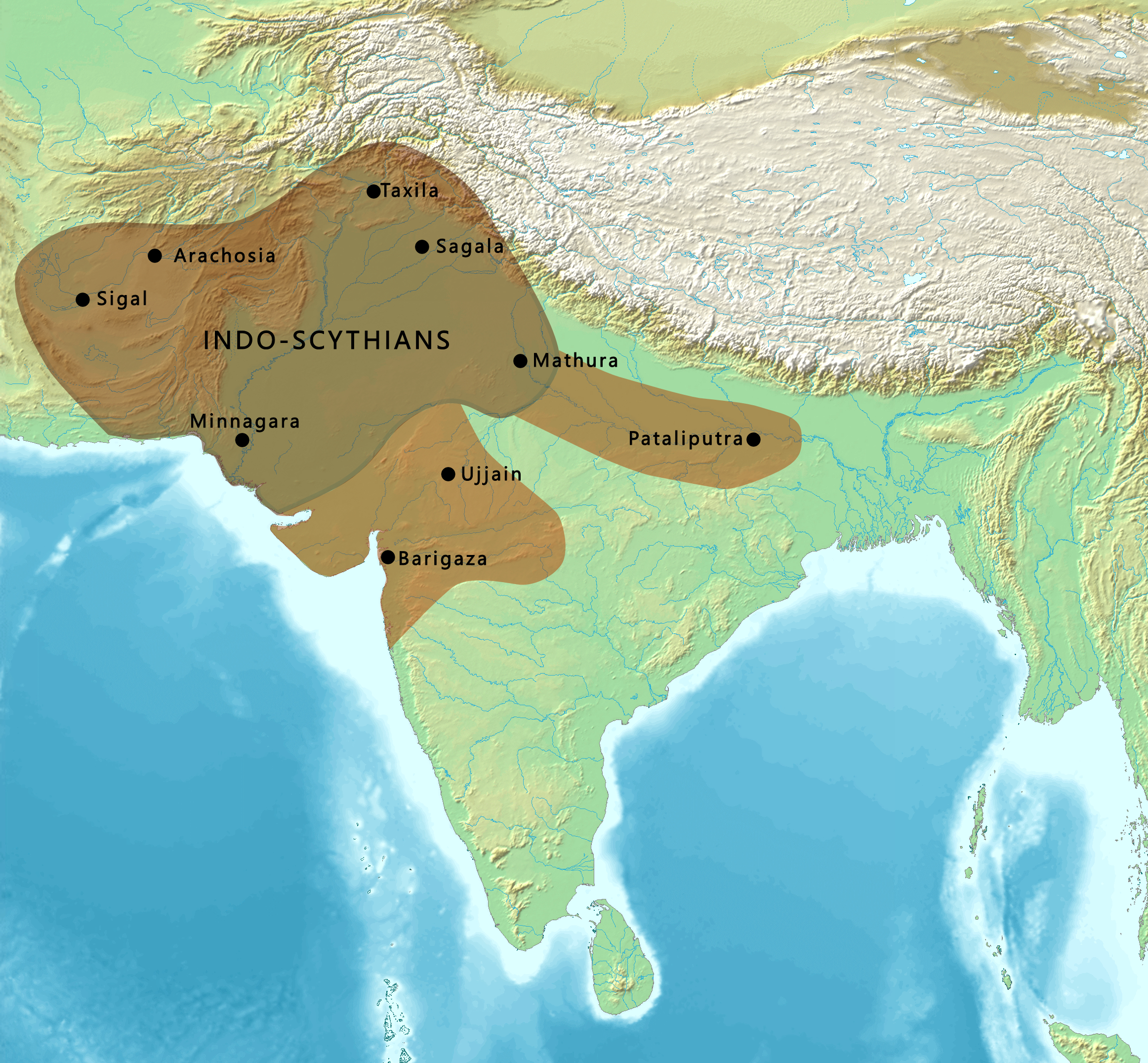
- Territories and expansion of the Indo-Scythians at their greatest extent, including territories of the Northern Satraps and Western Satraps.
- Capital: Ujjain/Ozene; Mathura; Taxila
- Common languages: Saka, Greek, Pali (Kharoshthi script), Sanskrit, Prakrit (Brahmi script)
- Religion: Hinduism; Jainism: Scythian religion; Ancient Greek religion; Buddhism; Zoroastrianism
- Government: Monarchy
- King
  - 85–60 BCE: Maues
  - 10–25 CE: Rajuvula
- Historical era: Antiquity
  - Established: c. 150 BCE
  - Disestablished: 400 CE

Area
- 20 est.: 2,600,000 km^{2} (1,000,000 sq mi)
Preceded by
Greco-Bactrian kingdom
Indo-Greek kingdom
Maurya Empire
Succeeded by
Kushan Empire
Sassanid Empire
Apracharajas
Indo-Parthians
Paratarajas
Gupta Empire
Northern Satraps
Western Satraps

The Indo-Scythians, also known as Indo-Sakas, were a group of nomadic people of Iranic Scythian origin who migrated from Central Asia southward into the present-day regions of Afghanistan, eastern Iran and the northwestern Indian subcontinent (present-day Pakistan and northern India). The migrations persisted from the middle of the second century BCE to the fourth century CE.

The first Saka king in the Indian subcontinent was Maues (first century BCE) who established Saka power in Gandhara, the Indus Valley, and other regions. The Indo-Scythians extended their supremacy over the north-western subcontinent, conquering the Indo-Greeks and other local peoples. They were apparently subjugated by the Kushan Empire's Kujula Kadphises or Kanishka. (Note: Kharapallana and Vanaspara are known from an inscription discovered in Sarnath and dated to the third year of Kanishka, in which they pledged allegiance to the Kushanas.) The Saka continued to govern as satraps, (Note: "The titles "Kshatrap" and "Mahakshatrapa" certainly show that the Western Kshatrapas were originally feudatories") forming the Northern Satraps and Western Satraps. The power of the Saka rulers began to decline during the 2nd century CE after the Indo-Scythians were defeated by the Satavahana emperor Gautamiputra Satakarni. Indo-Scythian rule in the northwestern subcontinent ended when the last Western Satrap, Rudrasimha III, was defeated by the Gupta emperor Chandragupta II in 395 CE.

The invasion of the northern Indian subcontinent by Scythian tribes from Central Asia, often referred to as the Indo-Scythian invasion, played a significant role in the history of the subcontinent and nearby regions. The Indo-Scythian war was triggered by the nomadic flight of Central Asians from conflict with tribes such as the Xiongnu in the second century B.C., which had lasting effects on Bactria, Kabul and the Indian subcontinent and Rome and Parthia in the west. Ancient Roman historians, including Arrian and Claudius Ptolemy, have mentioned that the ancient Sakas ("Sakai") were nomadic people. The first rulers of the Indo-Scythian kingdom were Maues (c. 85–60 BCE) and Vonones (c. 75–65 BCE).

== Origins ==
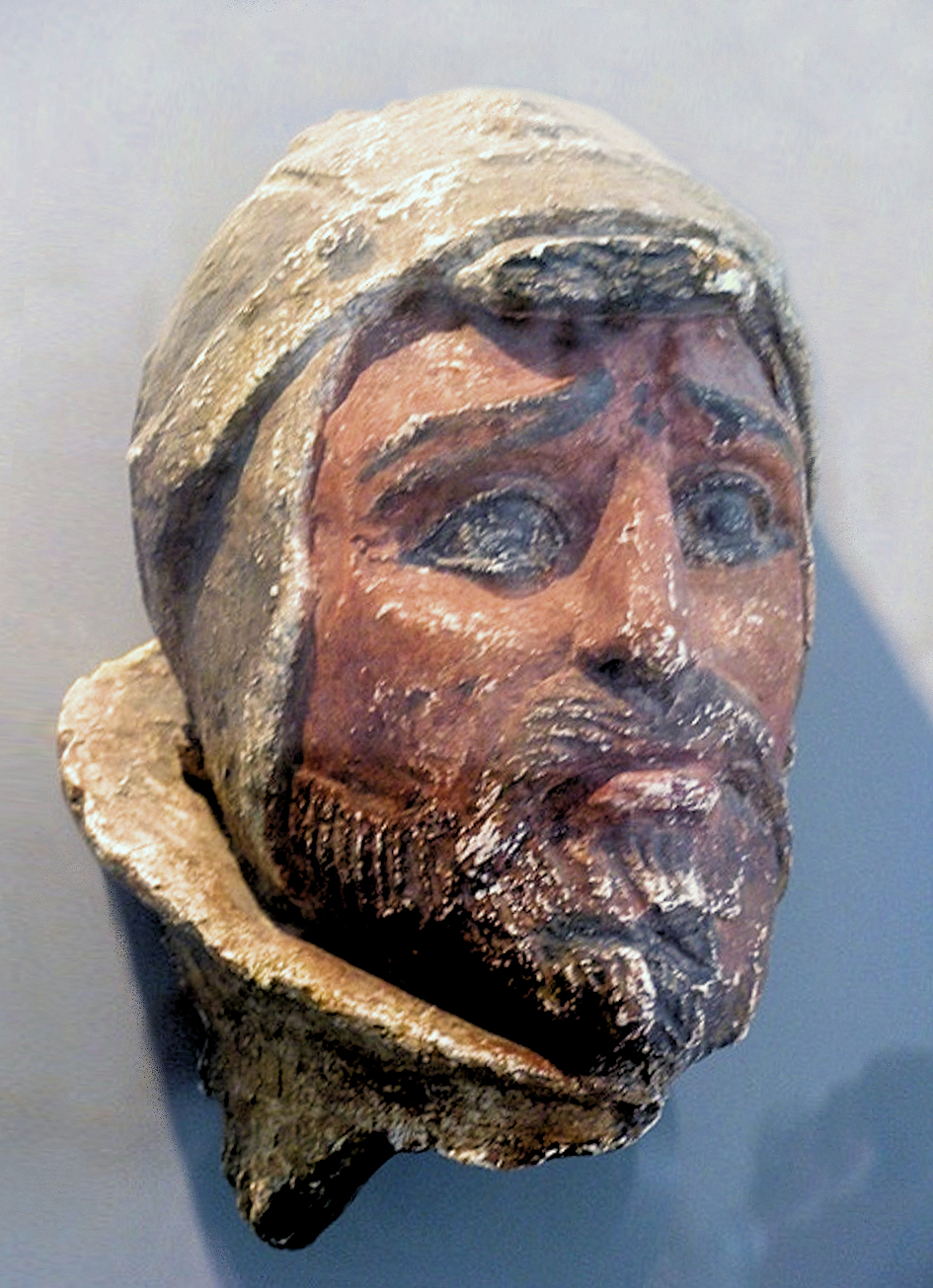
Sculpted head of a Saka warrior, enemy of the Yuezhi, from Khalchayan in northern Bactria (Afghanistan), first century BCE.

The ancestors of the Indo-Scythians are generally believed to have been Saka (Scythian) (Kamuia) Kamboja tribes.

One group of Indo-European speakers that makes an early appearance on the Xinjiang stage is the Saka (Ch. Sai). Saka is more a generic term than a name for a specific state or ethnic group; Saka tribes were part of a cultural continuum of early nomads across Siberia and the Central Eurasian steppe lands from Xinjiang to the Black Sea. Like the Scythians whom Herodotus describes in book four of his History (Saka is an Iranian word equivalent to the Greek Scythes, and many scholars refer to them together as Saka-Scythian), Sakas were Iranian-speaking horse nomads who deployed chariots in battle, sacrificed horses, and buried their dead in barrows or mound tombs called kurgans.

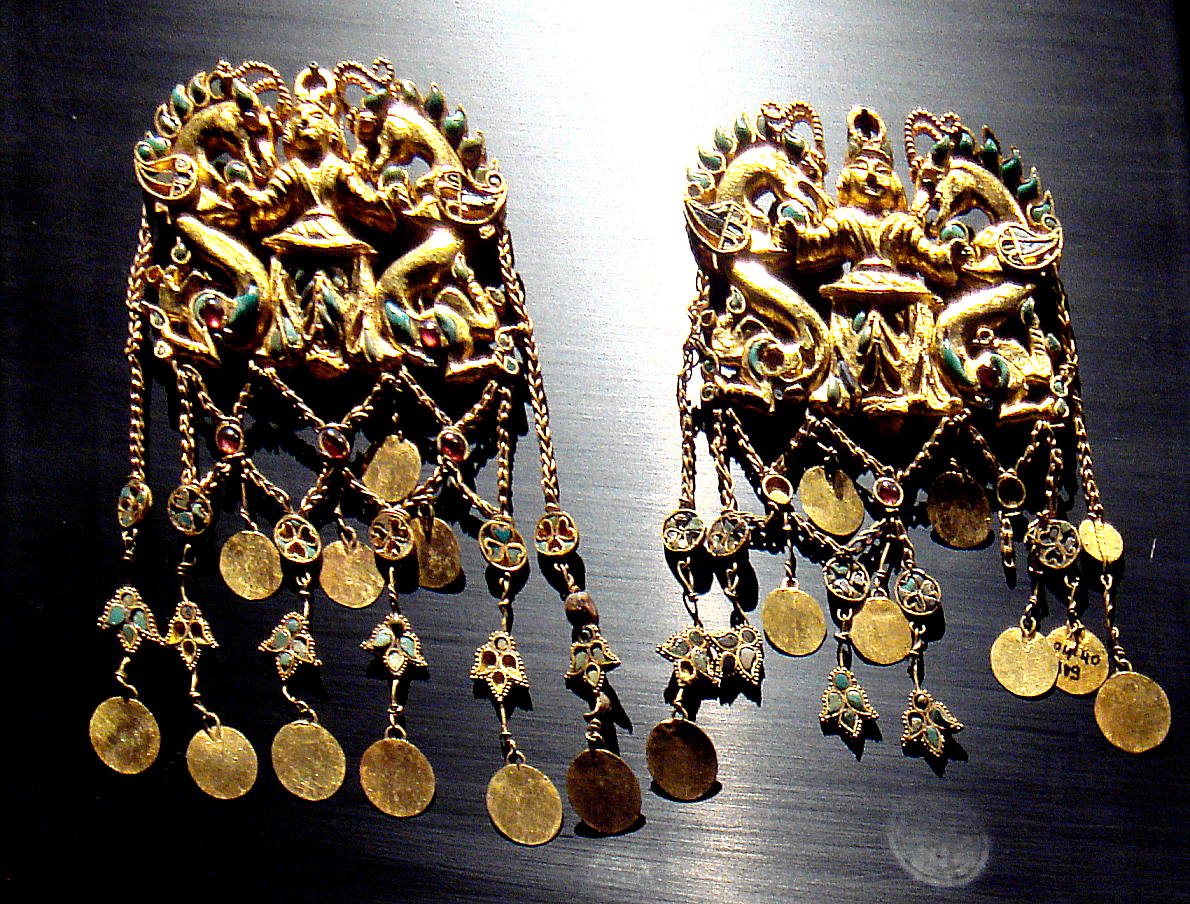

The Saka of western India spoke the Saka language (also known as Khotanese), first documented in the Tarim Basin.

=== Achaemenid period (6th–4th century BCE) ===
During the Achaemenid conquest of the Indus Valley c. 515 BCE, the Achaemenid army was not exclusively Persian, and the Saka probably participated in the invasion of northwest India. The army comprised a number of ethnic groups within the Achaemenid Empire, including Bactrians, Saka, Parthians, and Sogdians. Herodotus also listed the ethnicities of the Achaemenid army, including Ionians (Greeks) and Ethiopians. These groups were probably included in the Achaemenid army which invaded India.

Some scholars, including Michael Witzel and Christopher I. Beckwith, have suggested that the Shakya – the clan of Gautama Buddha – were originally Scythians from Central Asia, and that the Indian ethnonym Śākya shares the same origin as "Scythian". This has been cited to explain the strong Saka support of Buddhism in India. However this theory has come under criticism from other scholars such as Johannes Bronkhorst due to slim evidence.

The Persians, the Saka, and the Greeks may also have participated in the later campaigns of Chandragupta Maurya to gain the throne of Magadha c. 320 BCE. The Mudrarakshasa states that after Alexander the Great's death, Chandragupta Maurya used a Shaka-Yavana-Kamboja-Parasika-Bahlika alliance in his campaign to seize the throne of Magadha and found the Maurya Empire. The Saka were the Scythians, the Yavanas were the Greeks, and the Parasikas were the Persians.

=== Yuezhi expansion (2nd century BCE) ===
During the second century BCE, a nomadic movement began among Central Asian tribes. Recorded in the annals of the Han dynasty and other Chinese sources, the movement began after the Yuezhi tribe was defeated by the Xiongnu and fled west, creating a domino effect that displaced other Central Asian tribes in their path.

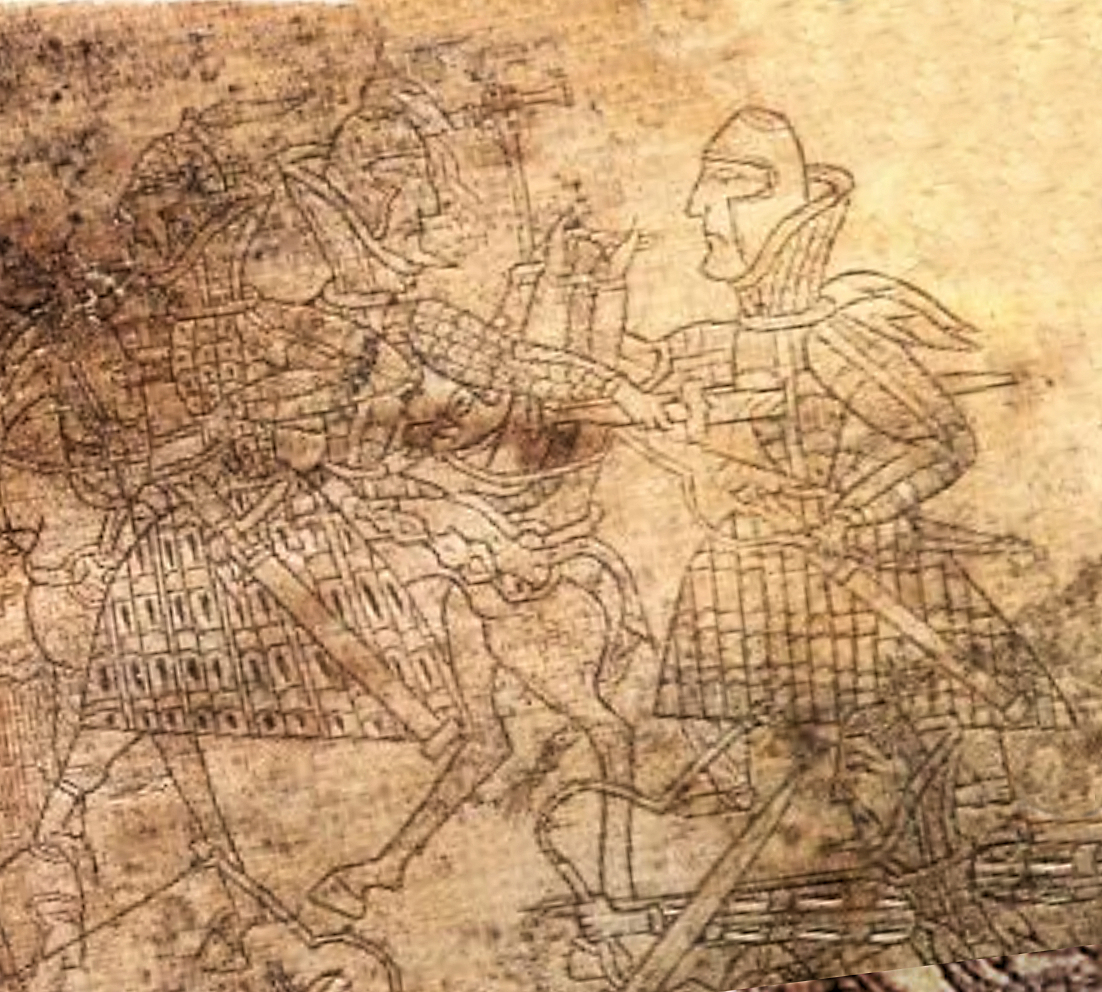
Detail of one of the Orlat plaques, apparently representing Scythian soldiers

According to these sources, Modu Shanyu of the Xiongnu attacked the Yuezhi (possibly related to the Tocharians, who lived in the eastern Tarim Basin) and expelled them from their homeland between the Qilian Shan and Dunhuang c. 175 BCE. Leaving a small remnant population, most of the Yuezhi moved west to the Ili River region, displacing the Saka, who migrated south into Ferghana and Sogdiana. According to Chinese historical chronicles (which refer to the Saka as "Sai" 塞), "[The Yuezhi] attacked the king of the Sai, who moved a considerable distance to the south, and the Yuezhi then occupied his lands."

Sometime after 155 BCE, the Yuezhi were again defeated by an alliance of the Wusun and the Xiongnu. They were forced to move south, again displacing the Scythians, who migrated toward Bactria and present-day Afghanistan, and southwest toward Parthia. A tribe known to ancient Greek writers as the Sacaraucae (probably from the Old Persian Sakaravaka, meaning "nomadic Saka") and an allied people, the Massagetae, came into conflict with the Parthian Empire between 138 and 124 BCE. The Sacaraucae–Massagetae alliance won several battles and killed the Parthian kings Phraates II and Artabanus I. The Yuezhi later migrated east into Bactria and subsequently conquered northern India, establishing the Kushan Empire.

== Settlement in Sakastan ==
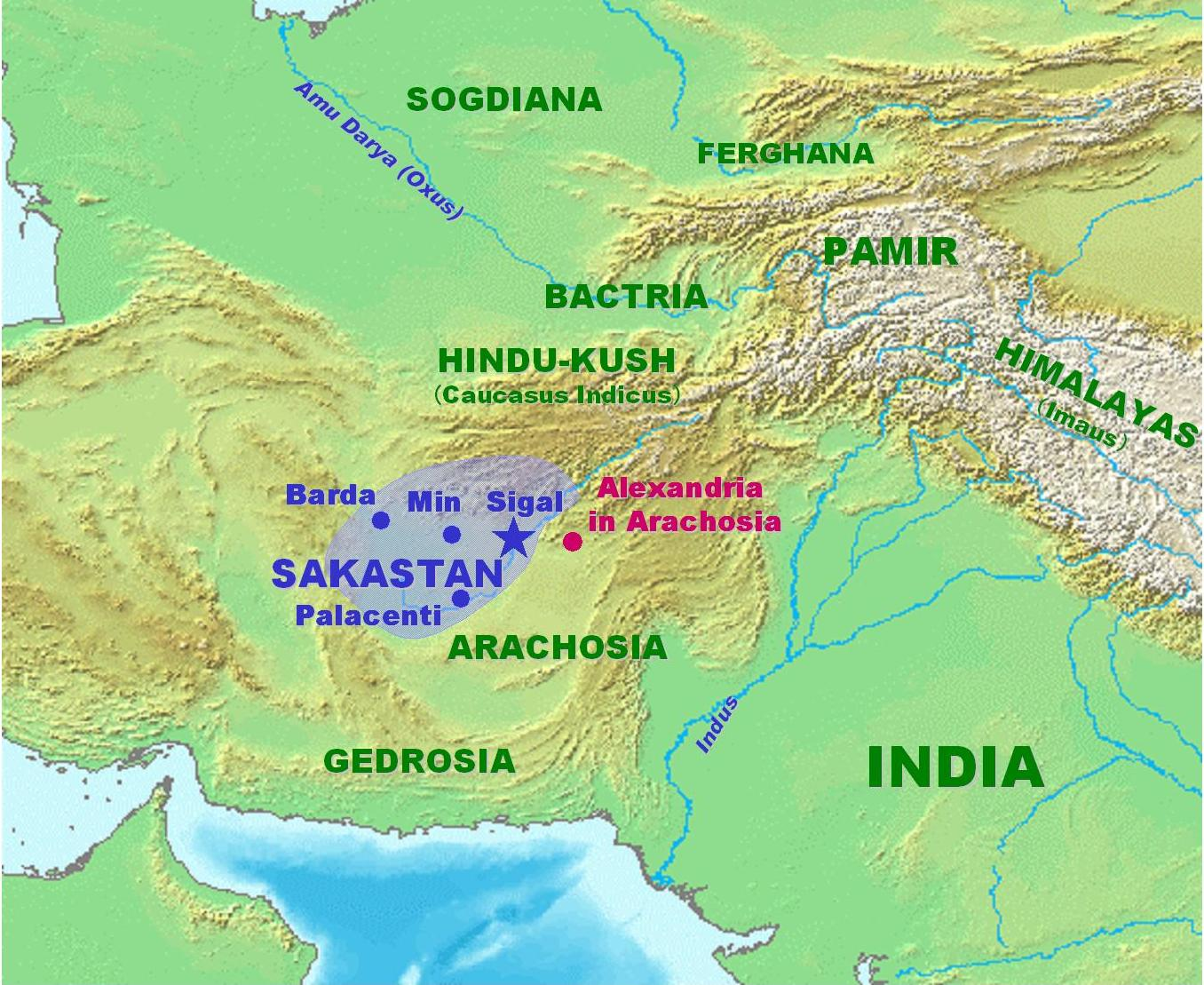
Map of Sakastan around 100 BCE

The Saka settled in regions mostly corresponding to the region of Drangiana, which was later called Sakastan or Sistan, a region of south-western Afghanistan, south-eastern Iran and extending across the borders of western Pakistan. The mixed Scythian hordes who migrated to Drangiana and the areas of Sakastan later gave rise to the Indo-Scythian Kingdom and vassal states in north and south-west India via the lower Indus valley. Beginning from Sovira, Gujarat, Rajasthan and north India, and expanding into kingdoms on the Indian mainland as well as increasing influence on other kingdoms.

The Arsacid emperor Mithridates II (c. 123–88/87 BCE) pursued an aggressive military policy in Central Asia and added a number of provinces to the Parthian Empire. This included western Bactria, which he seized from the Indo-Scythians.

Following military pressure from the Yuezhi (predecessors of the Kushana), some Indo-Scythians moved from Bactria to Lake Helmond (or Hāmūn) and settled in or near Drangiana (Sigal). The region came to be known as "Sakistana of the Skythian Sakai [sic]" towards the end of the first century BCE.

The presence of the Saka in Sakastan in the first century BCE is mentioned by Isidore of Charax in "The Parthian Stations". According to Isidore, they were bordered by Greek cities on the east (Alexandria of the Caucasus and Alexandria of the Arachosians) and the Parthian-controlled territory of Arachosia on the south:

Beyond is Sacastana of the Scythian Sacae, which is also Paraetacena, 63 schoeni. There are the city of Barda and the city of Min and the city of Palacenti and the city of Sigal; in that place is the royal residence of the Sacae; and nearby is the city of Alexandria (Alexandria Arachosia), and six villages.

== Kingdoms ==
=== Pamirs to Taxila ===
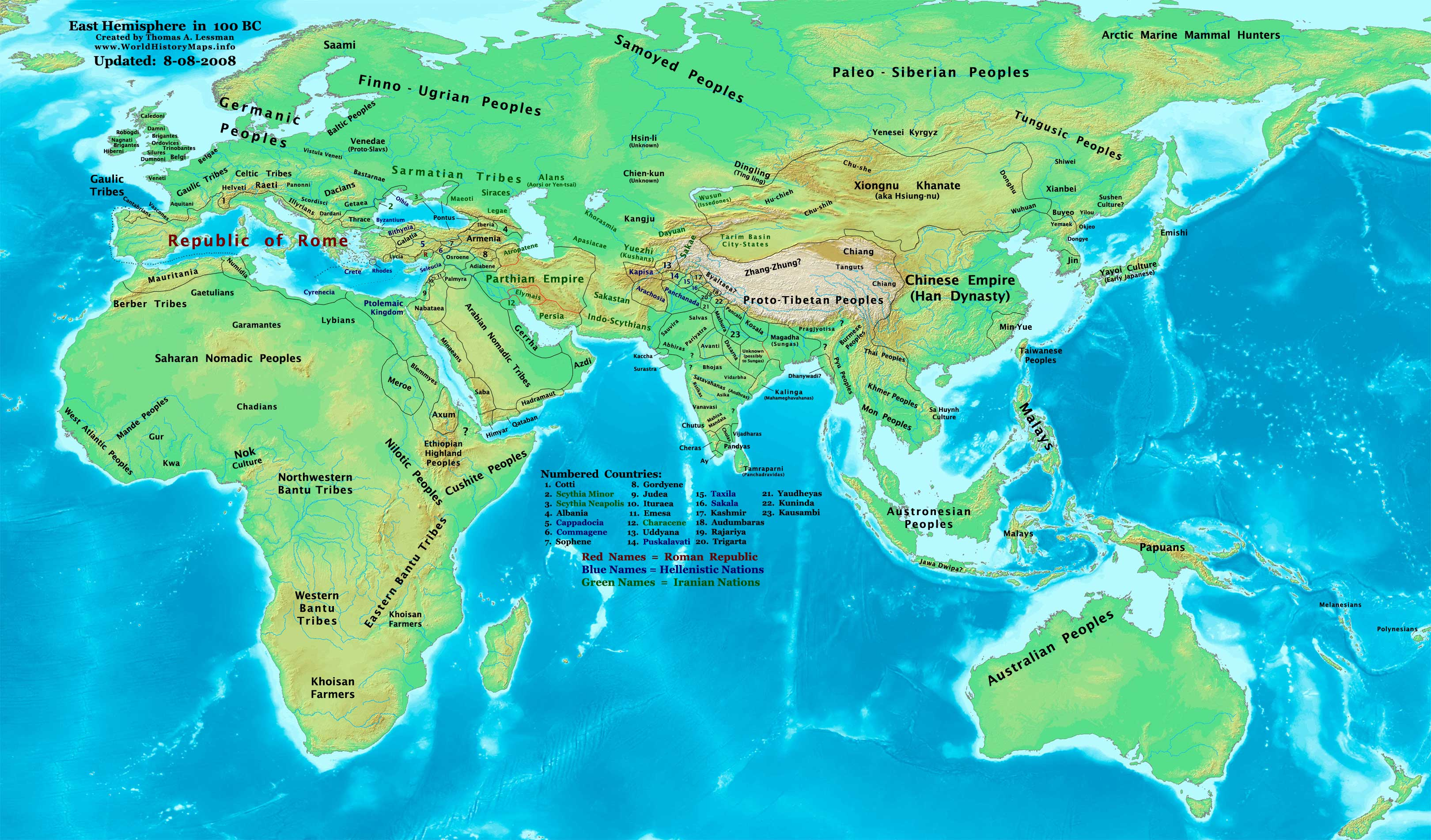
Asia in 100 BCE, showing the Saka and their neighbors

From petroglyphs left by Saka soldiers at river crossings in Chilas and on the Sacred Rock of Hunza in Pakistan, Ahmad Hassan Dani and Karl Jettmar have established the route across the Karakoram mountains used by Maues (the first Indo-Scythian king) to capture Taxila from Indo-Greek King Apollodotus II.

The first-century CE Periplus of the Erythraean Sea describes the Scythian territories:

Beyond this region (Gedrosia), the continent making a wide curve from the east across the depths of the bays, there follows the coast district of Scythia, which lies above toward the north; the whole marshy; from which flows down the river Sinthus, the greatest of all the rivers that flow into the Erythraean Sea, bringing down an enormous volume of water (...) This river has seven mouths, very shallow and marshy, so that they are not navigable, except the one in the middle; at which by the shore, is the market-town, Barbaricum. Before it there lies a small island, and inland behind it is the metropolis of Scythia, Minnagara; it is subject to Parthian princes who are constantly driving each other out ...

The Indo-Scythians established a kingdom in the northwest near Taxila, with two satraps: one at Mathura in the east, and the other at Surastrene (Gujarat) in the southwest.

=== Gandhara and Punjab ===
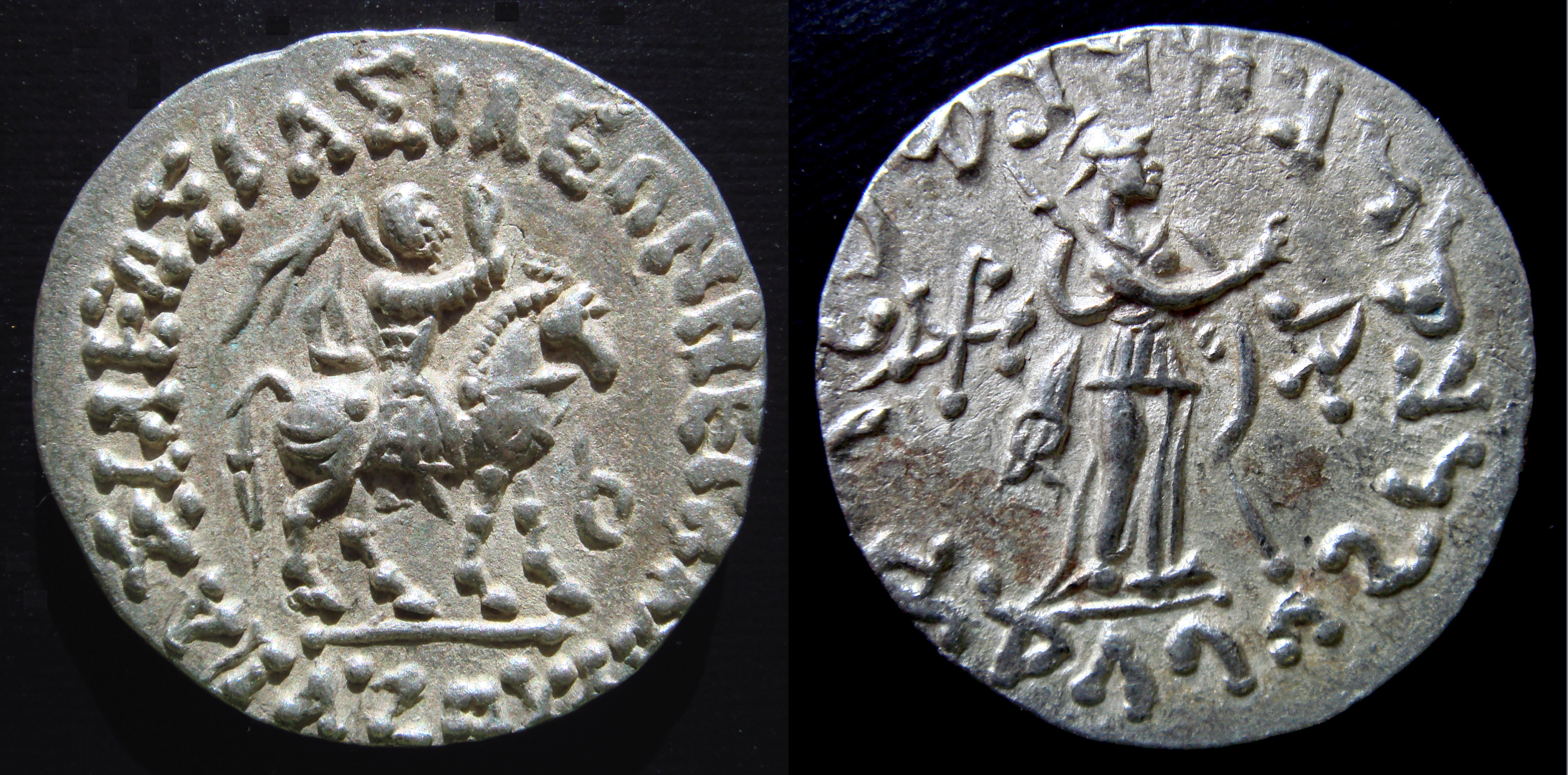
A coin of the Indo-Scythian king Azes

The presence of the Scythians in modern Pakistan and north-western India during the first century BCE was contemporaneous with the Indo-Greek kingdoms there, and they apparently initially recognized the power of the local Greek rulers. Maues first conquered Gandhara and Taxila in present-day Afghanistan and Pakistan c. 80 BCE, but his kingdom disintegrated after his death. In the east, the Indian king Vikrama retook Ujjain from the Indo-Scythians and celebrated his victory by establishing the Vikrama era in 58 BCE. Indo-Greek kings again ruled and prospered after Maues, as indicated by the profusion of coins from Kings Apollodotus II and Hippostratos. In 55 BCE, under Azes I, the Indo-Scythians took control of northwestern India with their victory over Hippostratos.

==== Sculpture ====
Excavations organized by John Marshall found several stone sculptures in the early Saka layer (layer number four, corresponding to the period of Azes I, in which a number of his coins were found). Several of them are toilet trays roughly imitative of finer Hellenistic examples found in earlier layers.

==== Bimaran casket ====
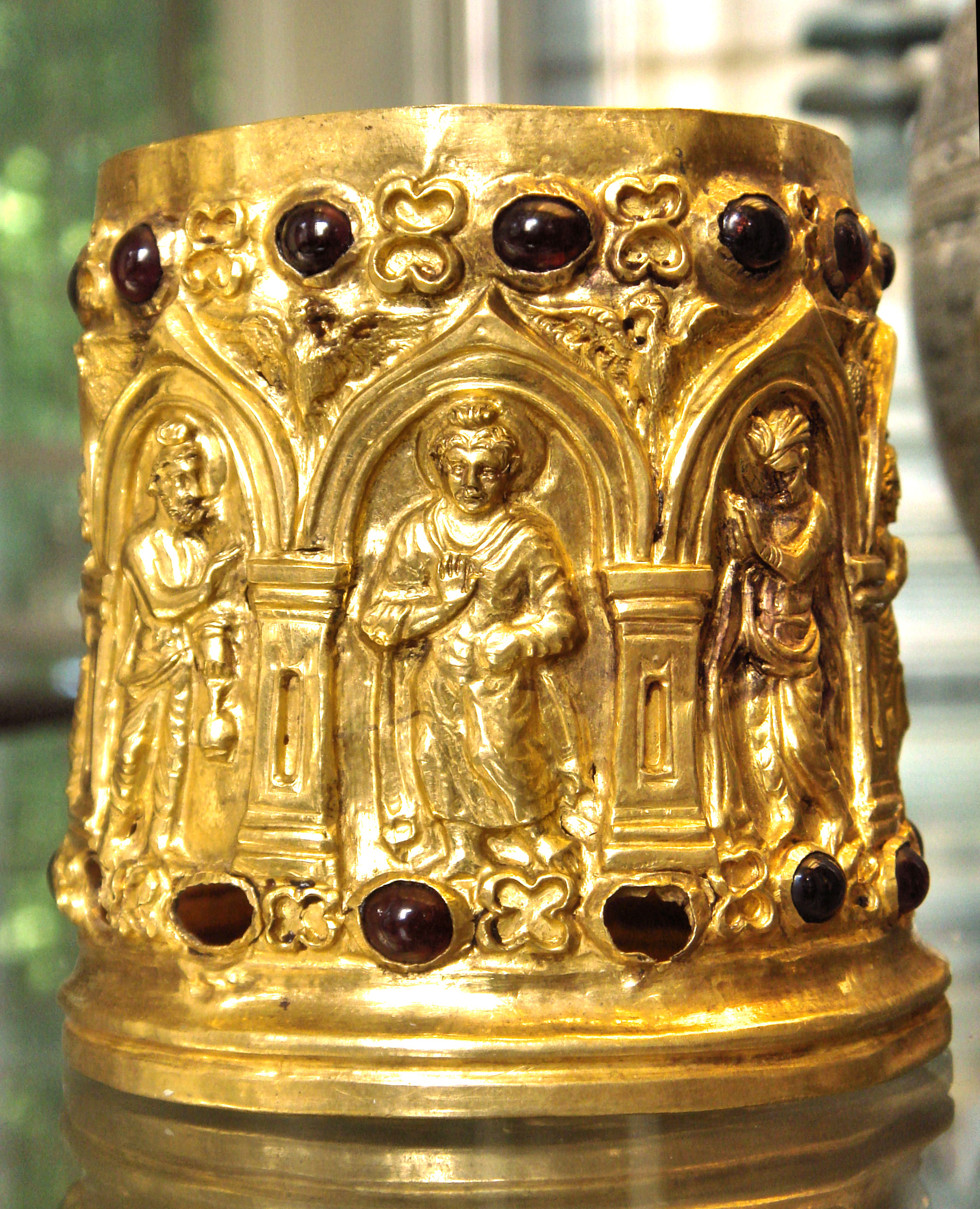
The Bimaran casket, representing the Buddha surrounded by Brahma (left) and Śakra, was found in a stupa with coins of Azes I inside. (British Museum)

Azes is connected to the Bimaran casket, one of the earliest representations of the Buddha. The reliquary was used for the dedication of a stupa in Bamiran, near Jalalabad in Afghanistan, and placed inside the stupa with several coins of Azes. This may have happened during the reign of Azes (60–20 BCE), or slightly later. The Indo-Scythians were connected with Buddhism.

=== Mathura region ===
In northern India, the Indo-Scythians conquered the Mathura region c. 60 BCE. Some of their satraps were Hagamasha and Hagana, who were followed by Rajuvula.

The Mathura lion capital, an Indo-Scythian sandstone capital which dates to the first century CE, describes in Kharoshthi script the gift of a stupa with a relic of the Buddha by Nadasi Kasa (Rajuvula's queen). The capital also mentions the genealogy of several Indo-Scythian Mathura satraps. Rajuvula apparently eliminated Strato II (the last Indo-Greek king) c. 10 CE and took Sagala, his capital city.

Coinage of the period, such as that of Rajuvula, tends to be crude. It is also debased; the silver content becomes lower and bronze content higher, an alloying technique suggesting a lack of wealth.

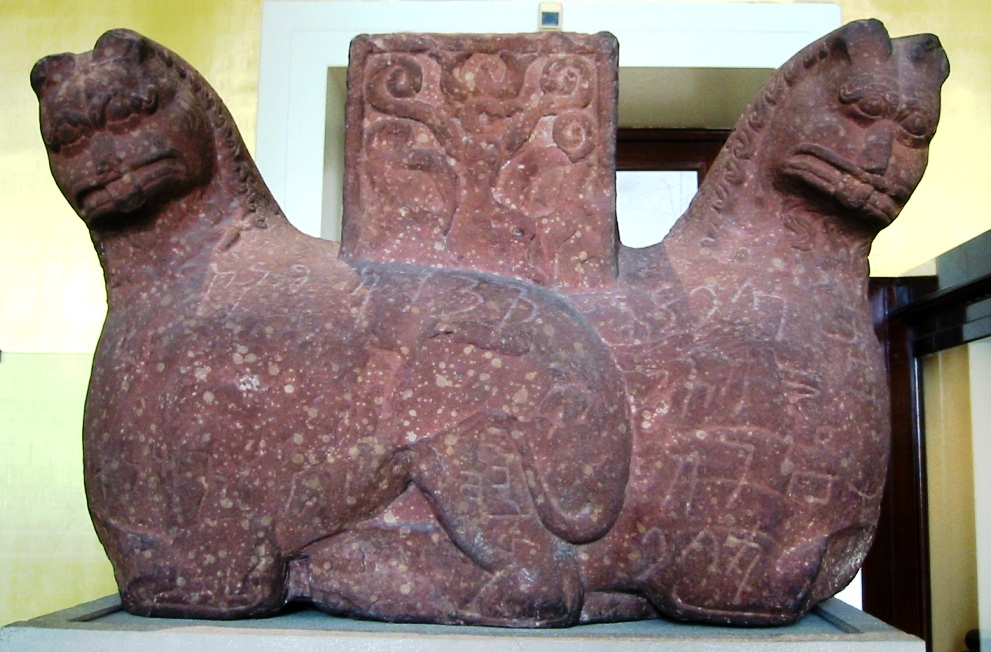
The Mathura lion capital

The Mathura lion capital inscriptions attest that Mathura came under Saka control. The inscriptions refer to Kharahostes and Queen Ayasia, the "chief queen of the Indo-Scythian ruler of Mathura, satrap Rajuvula." Kharahostes was the son of Arta, as attested by his own coins. Arta was the brother of King Maues.

The Indo-Scythian satraps of Mathura are sometimes called the Northern Satraps to distinguish them from the Western Satraps ruling in Gujarat and Malwa. After Rajuvula, several successors are known to have ruled as vassals of the Kushans. They include the "Great Satrap" Kharapallana and the satrap Vanaspara, who are known from an inscription discovered in Sarnath and dated to the third year of Kanishka (c. 130 CE), when they pledged allegiance to the Kushans.

=== Pataliputra ===
The Yuga Purana describes an invasion of Pataliputra by the Scythians during the first century BCE, after seven kings ruled in succession in Saketa following the retreat of the Yavanas. According to the Yuga Purana, the Saka king killed one-fourth of the population before he was slain by the Kalinga king Shata and a group of Sabalas.

=== Kushan and Indo-Parthian conquests ===
After Azes' death, Indo-Scythian rule in northwestern India ended with the rise of the Indo-Parthian ruler Gondophares late in the first century BCE. For the following decades, A number of minor Scythian leaders maintained themselves in local strongholds on the fringes of the loose Indo-Parthian empire over the next few decades, some paying allegiance to Gondophares I and his successors.

Indo-Parthian rule was gradually replaced with that of the Kushans, one of the five Yuezhi tribes who lived in Bactria for over a century and expanded into India during the late first century CE. The Kushans regained northwestern India c. 75 CE and the Mathura region c. 100, where they prospered for several centuries.

=== Western Satraps ===
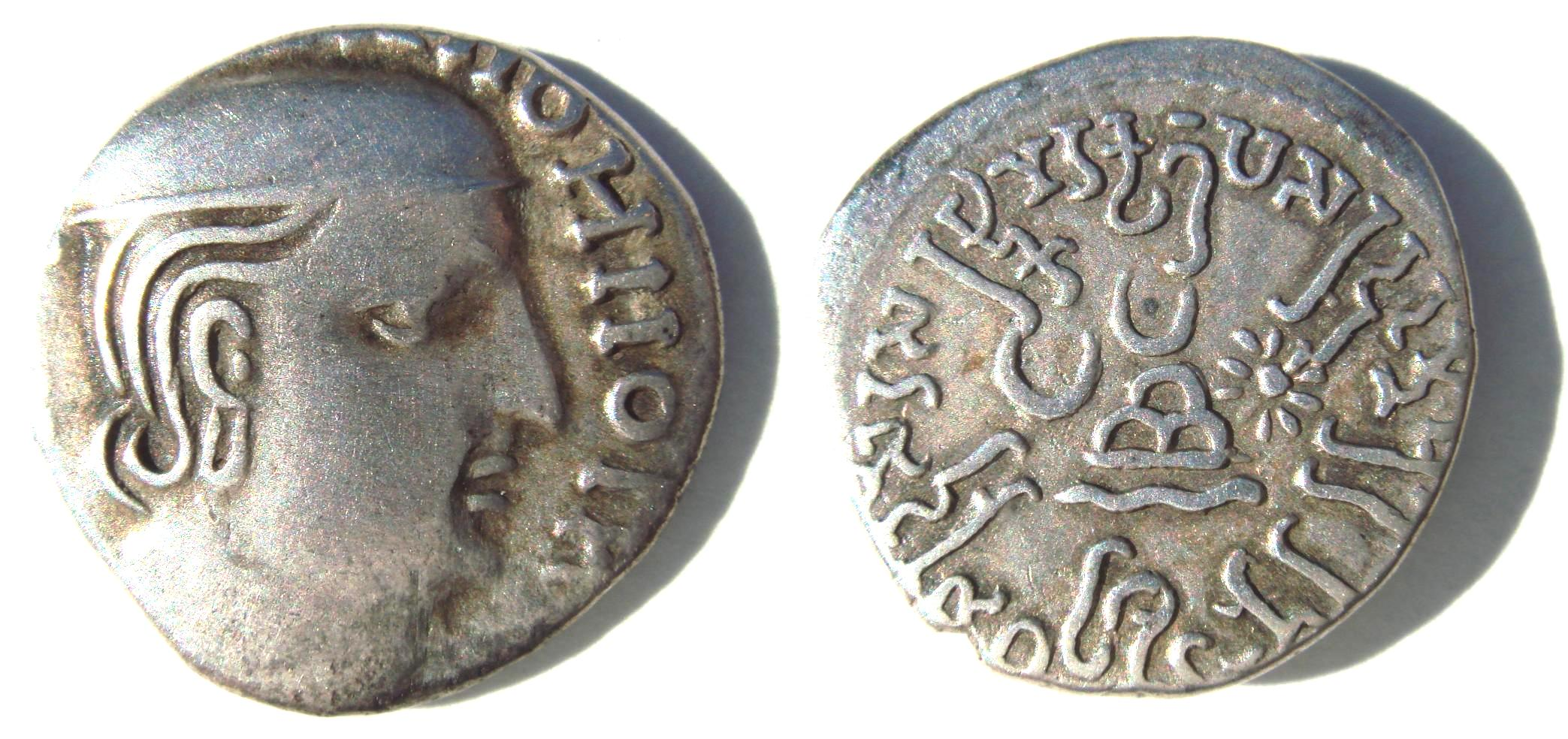
Coin of the western satrap Rudrasimha I (c. 175–197 CE), a descendant of the Indo-Scythians

Indo-Scythians continued to hold the Sistan region until the reign of Bahram II (276–293 CE), and held several areas of India well into the first millennium; Kathiawar and Gujarat were under Western Satrap rule until the fifth century. Rudradaman I's exploits are inscribed in the Junagadh rock inscription. During his campaigns, Rudradaman conquered the Yaudheyas and defeated the Satavahana Empire. The Western Satraps were conquered by the Gupta emperor Chandragupta II (also known as Vikramaditya).

== Coinage ==
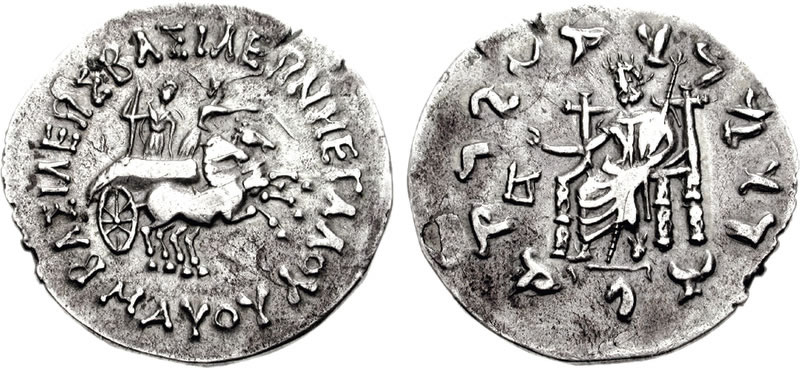
Silver tetradrachm of the Indo-Scythian king Maues (85–60 BCE)

Indo-Scythian coinage is generally of high quality, although the coins of Rajuvula deteriorate near the disintegration of Indo-Scythian rule c. 20 CE. A fairly high-quality, stereotypical coinage was continued by the Western Satraps until the fourth century.

Indo-Scythian coinage is generally realistic, artistically between Indo-Greek and Kushan coinage. It has been suggested that its coinage benefited from the help of Greek coin-makers. Indo-Scythian coins continue Indo-Greek tradition by using the Greek alphabet on the obverse and Kharoshthi script on the reverse. A portrait of the king is absent, with depictions of the king on a horse (sometimes on a camel) or sitting cross-legged on a cushion instead. The reverse of their coins typically show Greek gods.

Buddhist symbolism is present in Indo-Scythian coinage. The Indo-Scythians adopted the Indo-Greek practice (since Menander I) of depicting gods forming the vitarka mudra with their right hand (like Zeus on the coins of Maues or Azes II), the Buddhist lion on the coins of those two kings, or the triratana symbol on the coins of Zeionises.

== Art ==
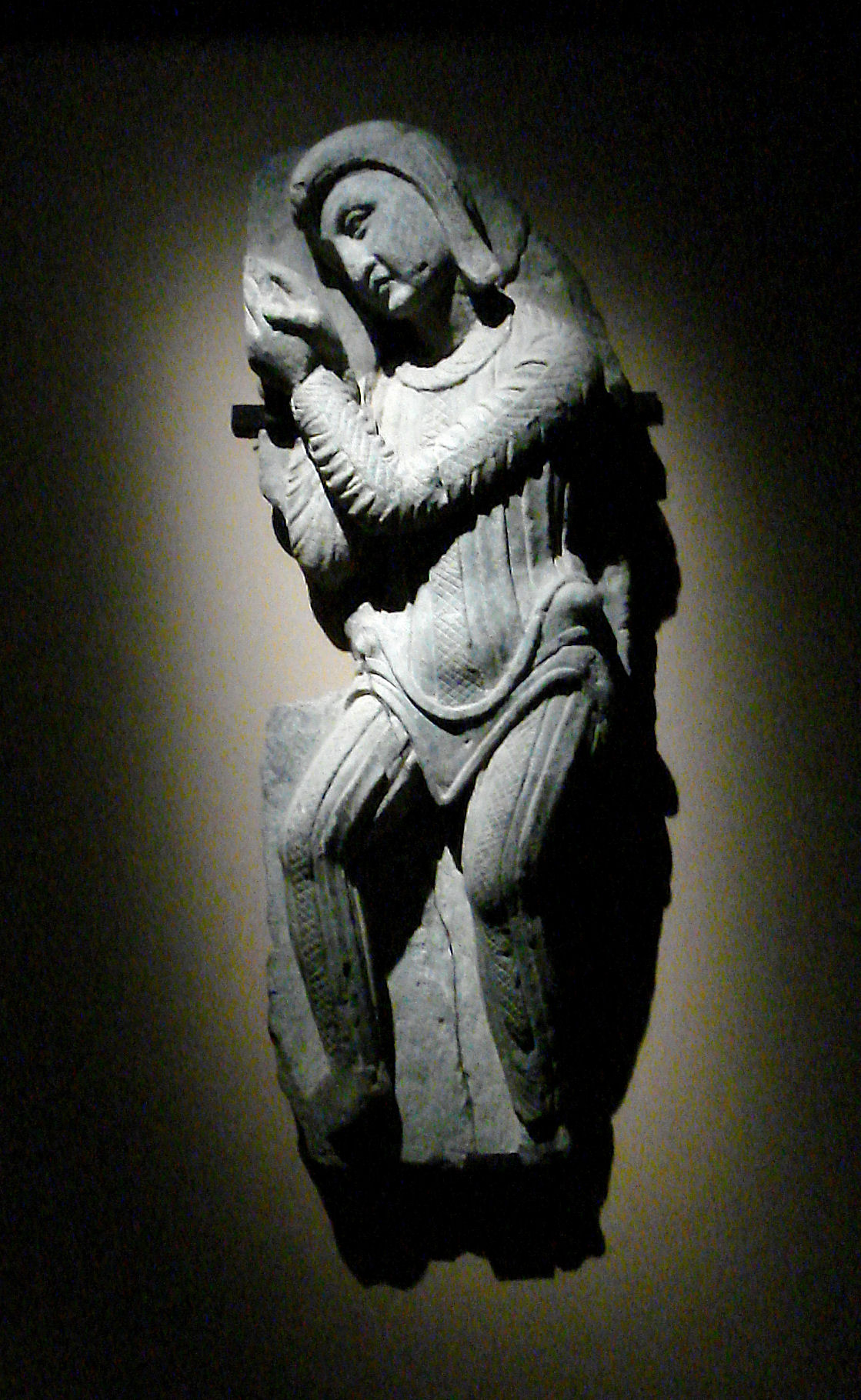
Scythian devotee, Butkara Stupa

Other than coins, few works of art are known to indisputably represent Indo-Scythians. Several Gandharan sculptures show foreigners in soft tunics, sometimes wearing the pointed hat typical of the Scythians. Kushan men seem to wear thick, rigid tunics, and are generally represented more simplistically.

=== Buner reliefs ===
Indo-Scythian soldiers in military attire are sometimes represented in Buddhist friezes in Gandharan art, particularly in the Buner reliefs. They are depicted in loose tunics with trousers, with heavy, straight swords. They wear pointed hoods or the Scythian cap; this distinguishes them from the Indo-Parthians, who wore a simple fillet over their bushy hair, and which is worn by Indo-Scythian rulers on their coins. With their right hand, some form the karana mudra to ward off evil spirits. In Gandhara, such friezes were used to decorate the pedestals of Buddhist stupas. They are contemporary with other friezes representing people in Greek attire, hinting at an intermixing of Indo-Scythians and Indo-Greeks. In another relief, the same type of soldiers are playing musical instruments and dancing; in Gandharan art, Indo-Scythians are typically depicted as reveling devotees.

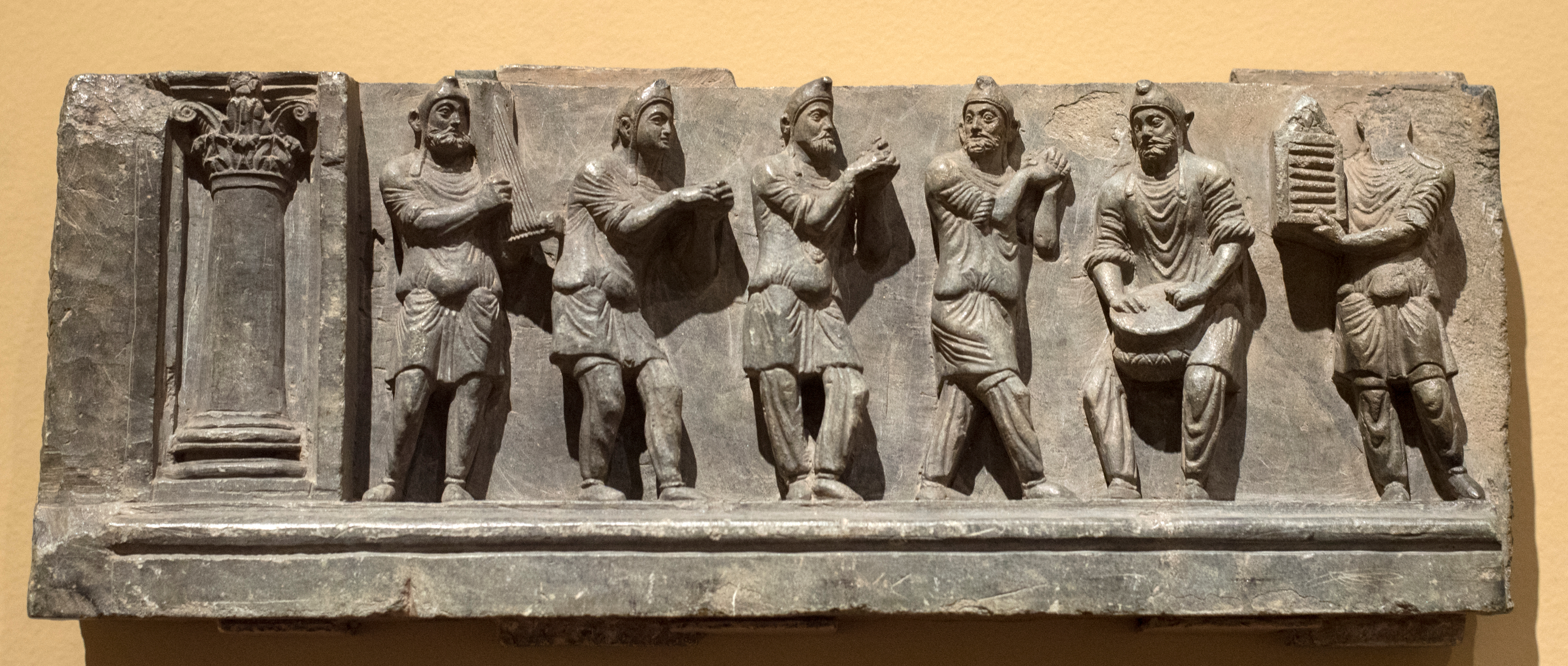
A Buner relief of Scythian soldiers dancing (Cleveland Museum of Art)

=== Stone palettes ===
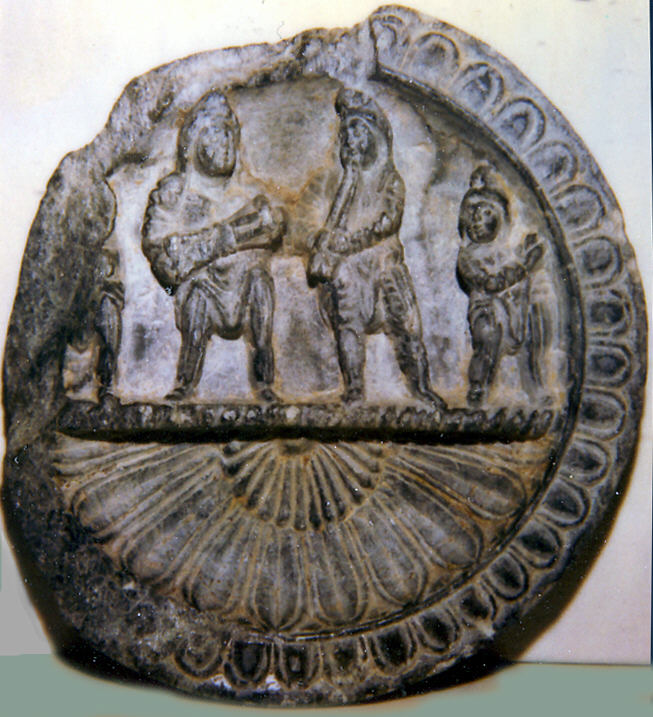
Gandhara stone palette of Scythians playing music

A number of stone palettes in Gandhara are considered representative of Indo-Scythian art. The palettes, which combine Greek and Iranian influences, often have a simple, archaic style. Stone palettes have only been found in archaeological layers corresponding to Indo-Greek, Indo-Scythian and Indo-Parthian rule, and are unknown in the preceding Mauryan layers or the succeeding Kushan layers.

The palettes often depict people in Greek dress in mythological scenes; a few have Parthian dress (headbands over bushy hair, crossed-over jacket on a bare chest, jewelry, belt, baggy trousers), and fewer have Indo-Scythian dress (Phrygian hat, tunic and straight trousers). A palette found in Sirkap, now in the New Delhi Museum, shows a winged Indo-Scythian horseman riding a winged deer and being attacked by a lion.

== Buddhism ==
The Indo-Scythians seem to have supported Buddhism, with many of their practices continuing those of the Indo-Greeks. They had an active role in the dissemination of Buddhism beyond India.

=== Royal dedications ===
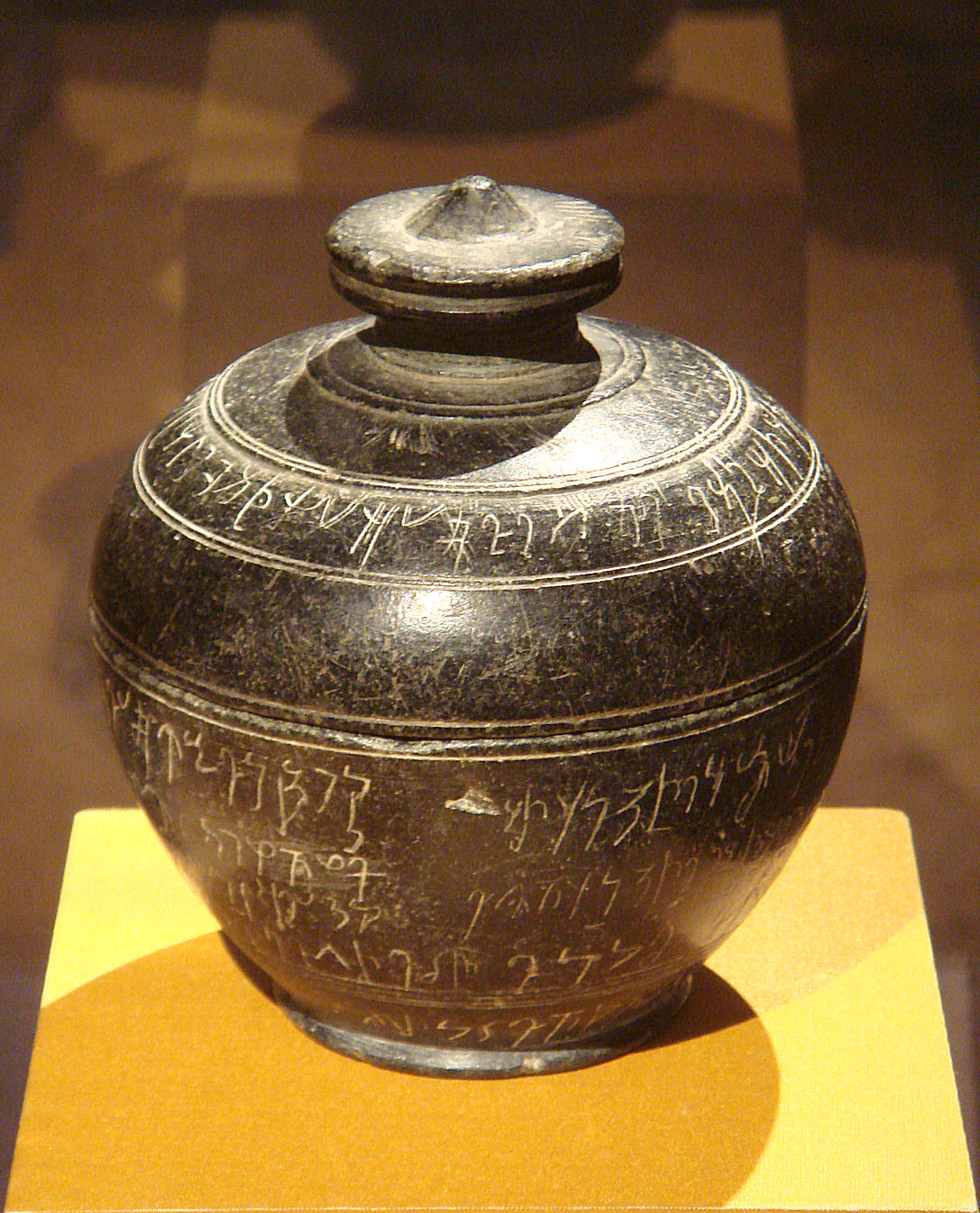
The Bajaur casket, dedicated by Indravarman (Metropolitan Museum of Art)

Several Indo-Scythian kings after Azes made Buddhist dedications in their name on plaques or reliquaries:

- Patika Kusulaka (25 BCE – 10 CE) related his donation of a relic of the Buddha Shakyamuni to a Buddhist monastery, in the Taxila copper plate.
- Kharahostes (10 BCE – 10 CE) is mentioned on the Buddhist Mathura lion capital and on a reliquary. His coins were also found in the Bimaran casket, a gold reliquary with an early image of the Buddha now in the British Museum. Some of his coins have the Buddhist triratna symbol.
- Vijayamitra (ruled 12 BCE - 15 CE) dedicated a Buddhist reliquary. Some of his coins bear the Buddhist triratna symbol.
- Indravarman, while a prince in 5-6 CE, dedicated the Bajaur casket now in the Metropolitan Museum of Art.
- Zeionises and Aspavarma used the triratna on their coins.
- Rajuvula erected the Mathura lion capital, which incorporates Buddhist symbols and relates the donations by his wife of relics to a stupa.

=== Butkara Stupa ===
Excavations at the Butkara Stupa in Swat by an Italian archaeological team have yielded Buddhist sculptures thought to belong to the Indo-Scythian period. An Indo-Corinthian capital of a Buddhist devotee in foliage has been found which had a reliquary and coins of Azes buried at its base, dating the sculpture to c. 20 BCE. A contemporary pilaster of a Buddhist devotee in Greek dress has been found at the same spot, again suggesting a mingling of the populations. Reliefs at the same location show Indo-Scythians, with characteristic tunics and pointed hoods, with reliefs of standing Buddhas.

== In Indian literature ==
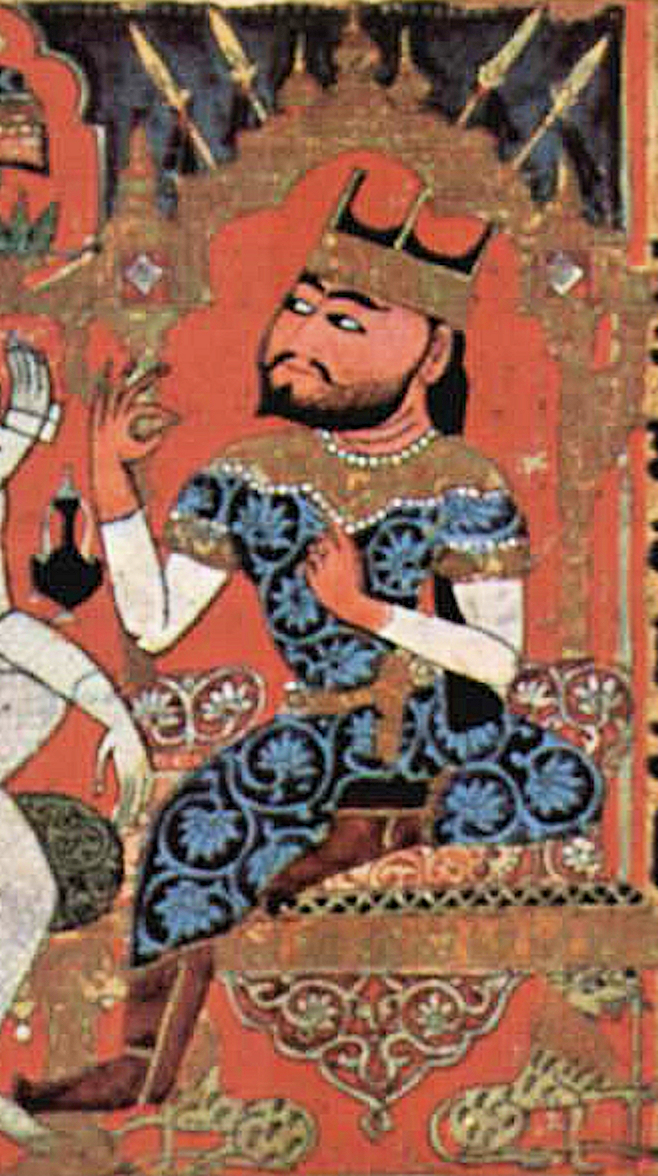
A Saka king of the 1st century BCE, in the Kālakācārya Kathā, circa 1400

The Indo-Scythians were named "Shaka" in India, a variation of the name "Saka" used by the Persians for Scythians. Shakas are mentioned in the Purāṇas, the Manusmṛti, the Rāmāyaṇa, the Mahābhārata, the Mahābhāṣya, the Bṛhat Saṃhitā by Varāhamihira, the Kāvyamīmāṃsā, the Bṛhatkathāmañjarīi, and the Kathāsaritsāgara. They are described as part of a group of other warlike tribes from the northwest.

There are references to the warring mleccha hordes of Sakas, Yavanas, Kambojas and Pahlavas in the Balakanda of the Ramayana. H. C. Raychadhury saw in these verses the struggles between the Hindus and the invading hordes of mleccha barbarians from the northwest beginning in the second century BCE, and fixed the date of the Ramayana around (or after) the 2nd century CE.

The Mahabharata also alludes to the invasion of mixed hordes from the northwest, with prophetic verses that "...the Mlechha (barbaric) kings of the Shakas, Yavanas, Kambojas, Bahlikas ... shall rule the earth un-righteously in Kali Yuga ..."

== Sai-Wang hordes ==
A portion of Central Asian Scythians under Sai-Wang reportedly moved south, crossed the Pamir Mountains and entered Chipin (or Kipin) after crossing the Xuandu (懸度, Hanging Pass) above the valley of Kanda in Swat. Chipin has been identified by Pelliot, Bagchi, Raychaudhury and others as Kashmir, but other scholars identify it as Kafiristan. Sai-Wang established his kingdom in Kipin. Konow interprets the Sai-Wang as the Śaka Murunda of Indian literature; murunda is synonymous with wang (king, master or lord). Bagchi interprets Wang as the king of the Scythians, but distinguishes the Sai Sakas from the Murunda Sakas. The Sai Scythians may have been Kamboja Scythians; the Sai-Wang were part of the Parama Kamboja kingdom of Transoxiana, and returned after being evicted from their ancestral land. Maues might have belonged to this group of Scythians who migrated from the Sai country (Central Asia) to Chipin.

== Evidence of joint invasions ==
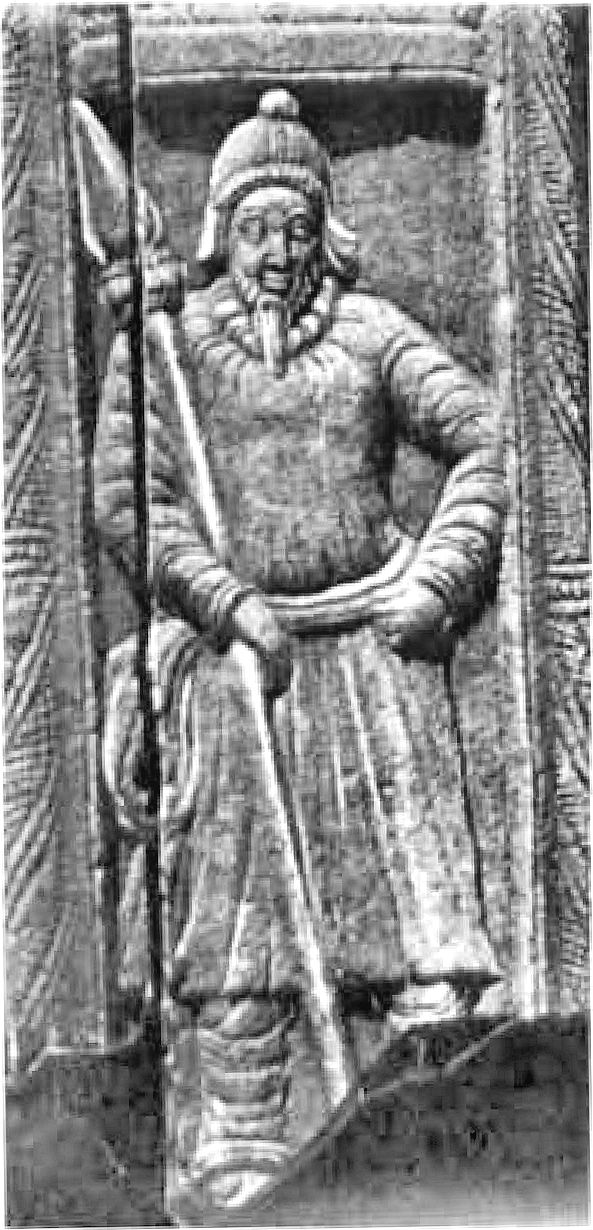
"Scythian" soldier, Nagarjunakonda.

The Scythian groups who invaded India and established kingdoms included, in addition to the Saka, allied tribes such as the Medii, Xanthii, and Massagetae. These peoples were absorbed into mainstream Indian society.

The Shakas were from the trans-Hemodos region—the Shakadvipa of the Puranas or the Scythia of classical writings. At the beginning of the first century CE, Isidore of Charax notes their presence in Sistan. The Periplus of the Erythraean Sea (c. 70–80 CE) documents a Scythian district in the lower Indus Valley, with Minnagra its capital. Ptolemy (c. 140 CE) also documents an Indo-Scythia in south-western India which consisted of the Patalene and Surastrene (Saurashtra) territories. The second-century BCE Scythian invasion of India was probably carried out jointly by the Saka, Pahlavas, Kambojas, Paradas, Rishikas and other allied tribes from the northwest.

== Legacy ==
Tadeusz Sulimirski notes that the Saka invaded parts of northern India. Indian linguist Weer Rajendra Rishi has identified linguistic affinities between Indian and Central Asian languages, which also suggests a Saka influence in northern India.

== See also ==
- Central Asians in ancient Indian literature
- Han–Xiongnu War

== Sources ==
- Bailey, H. W. 1958. "Languages of the Saka." Handbuch der Orientalistik, I. Abt., 4. Bd., I. Absch., Leiden-Köln. 1958.
- Faccenna D., "Sculptures from the sacred area of Butkara I", Istituto Poligrafico Dello Stato, Libreria Dello Stato, Rome, 1964.
- Harmatta, János, ed., 1994. History of civilizations of Central Asia, Volume II. The development of sedentary and nomadic civilizations: 700 B.C. to A.D. 250. Paris, UNESCO Publishing.
- Hill, John E. 2004. The Peoples of the West from the Weilue 魏略 by Yu Huan 魚豢: A Third Century Chinese Account Composed between AD 239 and 265. Draft annotated English translation.
- Hill, John E. (2009) Through the Jade Gate to Rome: A Study of the Silk Routes during the Later Han Dynasty, 1st to 2nd Centuries AD. BookSurge, Charleston, South Carolina. ISBN 978-1-4392-2134-1.
- Hirakawa, Akira (1993). History of Indian Buddhism: From Śākyamuni to Early Mahāyāna. Motilall Banarsidas.
- Hulsewé, A. F. P. and Loewe, M. A. N. 1979. China in Central Asia: The Early Stage 125 BC – AD 23: an annotated translation of chapters 61 and 96 of the History of the Former Han Dynasty. E. J. Brill, Leiden.
- Huet, Gerard (2010) "Heritage du Sanskrit Dictionnaire, Sanskrit-Francais," p. 128. Archived 27 February 2008 at the Wayback Machine
- Litvinsky, B. A., ed., 1996. History of civilizations of Central Asia, Volume III. The crossroads of civilizations: A.D. 250 to 750. Paris, UNESCO Publishing.
- Liu, Xinru 2001 "Migration and Settlement of the Yuezhi-Kushan: Interaction and Interdependence of Nomadic and Sedentary Societies." Journal of World History, Volume 12, No. 2, Fall 2001. University of Hawaii Press, pp 261–292. .
- Bulletin of the Asia Institute: The Archaeology and Art of Central Asia. Studies From the Former Soviet Union. New Series. Edited by B. A. Litvinskii and Carol Altman Bromberg. Translation directed by Mary Fleming Zirin. Vol. 8, (1994), pp 37–46.
- Millward, James A. (2007). Eurasian Crossroads: A History of Xinjiang. Columbia University Press, New York. ISBN 978-0-231-13924-3.
- Neelis, Jason (2010). arly Buddhist Transmission and Trade Networks: Mobility and Exchange Within and Beyond the Northwestern Borderlands of South Asia. BRILL.
- Pulleyblank, Edwin G. 1970. "The Wu-sun and Sakas and the Yüeh-chih Migration." Bulletin of the School of Oriental and African Studies 33 (1970), pp 154–160.
- Ptolemy (1932). The Geography. Translated and edited by Edward Luther Stevenson. 1991 unabridged reproduction. Dover Publications, Mineola, N. Y. ISBN 0-486-26896-9 (pbk)
- Puri, B. N. 1994. "The Sakas and Indo-Parthians." In: History of civilizations of Central Asia, Volume II. The development of sedentary and nomadic civilizations: 700 B.C. to A.D. 250. Harmatta, János, ed., 1994. Paris: UNESCO Publishing, pp 191–207.
- Ronca, Italo (1971). Ptolemaios Geographie 6,9–21. Ostrian und Zentralasien, Teil I. IsMEO — ROM.
- Seldeslachts, Erik (2007). "Greece, the Final Frontier? The Westwards Spread of Buddhism". In Heirman, Ann; Bumbacher, Stephan Peter (eds.). The Spread of Buddhism. BRILL.
- Watson, Burton. Trans. 1993. Records of the Grand Historian of China: Han Dynasty II (Revised Edition). Translated from the Shih chi of Ssu-ma Ch'ien. Chapter 123: The Account of Ta-yüan. Columbia University Press. ISBN 0-231-08167-7
- Wilcox, Peter and Angus McBride (1986). Rome's Enemies (3): Parthians and Sassanid Persians (Men-at-Arms). Osprey Publishing; illustrated edition. ISBN 978-0-85045-688-2.
- Yu, Taishan. 1998. A Study of Saka History. Sino-Platonic Papers No. 80. July 1998. Dept. of Asian and Middle Eastern Studies, University of Pennsylvania.
- Yu, Taishan. 2000. A Hypothesis about the Source of the Sai Tribes. Sino-Platonic Papers No. 106. September 2000. Dept. of Asian and Middle Eastern Studies, University of Pennsylvania.
- Political History of Ancient India, 1996, H. C. Raychaudhury
- Hindu Polity, A Constitutional history of India in Hindu Times, 1978, K. P. Jayswal
- Geographical Data in Early Puranas, 1972, M. R. Singh
- India and Central Asia, 1955, P. C. Bagchi.
- Geography of Puranas, 1973, S. M. Ali
- Greeks in Bactria and India, W. W. Tarn
- Early History of North India, S. Chattopadhyava
- Sakas in Ancient India, S. Chattopadhyava
- Development of Kharoshthi script, C. C. Dasgupta
- Ancient India, 1956, R. K. Mukerjee
- Ancient India, Vol III, T. L. Shah
- Hellenism in Ancient India, G. N. Banerjee
- Manu and Yajnavalkya, K. P. Jayswal
- Anabaseeos Alexanddrou, Arrian
- Mathura lion capital inscriptions
- Corpus Inscriptionium Indicarum, Vol II, Part I, S. Konow

Territories/ dates	Western India	Western Pakistan Balochistan	Paropamisadae Arachosia	Bajaur	Gandhara	Western Punjab	Eastern Punjab	Mathura
			INDO-GREEK KINGDOM					
90–85 BCE			Nicias	Menander II		Artemidoros		
90–70 BCE			Hermaeus	Archebius				
85-60 BCE			INDO-SCYTHIAN KINGDOM; Maues					
75–70 BCE			Vonones; Spalahores	Telephos		Apollodotus II		
65–55 BCE			Spalirises; Spalagadames			Hippostratos	Dionysios	
55–35 BCE			Azes I				Zoilos II	
55–35 BCE			Azilises; Azes II				Apollophanes	Indo-Scythian dynasty of the NORTHERN SATRAPS; Hagamasha
25 BCE – 10 CE				Indo-Scythian dynasty of the APRACHARAJAS; Vijayamitra (ruled 12 BCE - 15 CE) (Note: From the dated inscription on the Rukhana reliquary)	Liaka Kusulaka; Patika Kusulaka; Zeionises	Kharahostes (ruled 10 BCE– 10 CE) (Note: An Inscribed Silver Buddhist Reliquary of the Time of King Kharaosta and Prince Indravarman, Richard Salomon, Journal of the American Oriental Society, Vol. 116, No. 3 (Jul. - Sep., 1996), pp. 442); Mujatria	Strato II and Strato III	Hagana
10-20 CE		INDO-PARTHIAN KINGDOM; Gondophares		Indravasu	INDO-PARTHIAN KINGDOM; Gondophares		Rajuvula	
20-30 CE			Ubouzanes; Pakores	Vispavarma (ruled c.0-20 CE) (Note: A Kharosthī Reliquary Inscription of the Time of the Apraca Prince Visnuvarma, by Richard Salomon, South Asian Studies 11 1995, Pages 27-32, Published online: 09 Aug 2010)	Sarpedones		Bhadayasa	Sodasa
30-40 CE			KUSHAN EMPIRE; Kujula Kadphises	Indravarma	Abdagases		...	...
40-45 CE				Aspavarma	Gadana		...	...
45-50 CE				Sasan	Sases		...	...
50-75 CE							...	...
75-100 CE	Indo-Scythian dynasty of the WESTERN SATRAPS; Chastana		Vima Takto				...	...
100-120 CE	Abhiraka		Vima Kadphises				...	...
120 CE	Bhumaka; Nahapana	PARATARAJAS; Yolamira	Kanishka I				Great Satrap Kharapallana and Satrap Vanaspara for Kanishka I	
130-230 CE	Jayadaman; Rudradaman I Damajadasri I Jivadaman; Rudrasimha I Satyadaman; Jivadaman; Rudrasena I	Bagamira; Arjuna; Hvaramira; Mirahvara	Vāsishka (c. 140 – c. 160); Huvishka (c. 160 – c. 190); Vasudeva I (c. 190 – to at least 230)					
230-280 CE	Samghadaman; Damasena; Damajadasri II; Viradaman; Isvaradatta; Yasodaman I Vijayasena; Damajadasri III; Rudrasena II; Visvasimha	Miratakhma; Kozana; Bhimarjuna; Koziya; Datarvharna; Datarvharna	INDO-SASANIANS; Ardashir I, Sassanid king and "Kushanshah" (c. 230 – 250); Peroz I, "Kushanshah" (c. 250 – 265); Hormizd I, "Kushanshah" (c. 265 – 295)			Kanishka II (c. 230 – 240); Vashishka (c. 240 – 250); Kanishka III (c. 250 – 275)		
280-300 CE	Bhratadarman	Datayola II	Hormizd II, "Kushanshah" (c. 295 – 300)			Vasudeva II (c. 275 – 310)		
300-320 CE	Visvasena; Rudrasimha II; Jivadaman		Peroz II, "Kushanshah" (c. 300 – 325)			Vasudeva III; Vasudeva IV; Vasudeva V Chhu (c. 310? – 325)		
320-388 CE	Yasodaman II; Rudradaman II; Rudrasena III; Simhasena; Rudrasena IV		Shapur II Sassanid king and "Kushanshah" (c. 325); Varhran I, Varhran II, Varhran III "Kushanshahs" (c. 325 – 350); Peroz III "Kushanshah" (c. 350 –360); HEPHTHALITE/ HUNAS invasions			Shaka I (c. 325 – 345); Kipunada (c. 345 – 375)		GUPTA EMPIRE; Chandragupta I Samudragupta
388-395 CE	Rudrasimha III		Chandragupta II					

Timeline and cultural period	Indus plain (Punjab-Sapta Sindhu-Gujarat)	Gangetic Plain			Central India	Southern India
Timeline and cultural period	Indus plain (Punjab-Sapta Sindhu-Gujarat)	Upper Gangetic Plain (Ganga-Yamuna doab)	Middle Gangetic Plain	Lower Gangetic Plain	Central India	Southern India
IRON AGE
Culture	Late Vedic Period	Late Vedic Period; Painted Grey Ware culture	Late Vedic Period; Northern Black Polished Ware		Pre-history	
6th century BCE	Gandhara	Kuru-Panchala	Magadha		Adivasi (tribes)	Assaka
Culture	Persian-Greek influences	"Second Urbanisation"; Rise of Shramana movements Jainism - Buddhism - Ājīvika - Yoga			Pre-history	
5th century BCE	(Persian conquests)		Shaishunaga dynasty		Adivasi (tribes)	Assaka
4th century BCE	(Greek conquests)	Nanda empire				
HISTORICAL AGE
Culture	Spread of Buddhism				Pre-history	
3rd century BCE	Maurya Empire					Satavahana dynasty Sangam period (300 BCE – 200 CE); Early Cholas; Early Pandyan kingdom Cheras
Culture	Preclassical Hinduism (Note: Michaels (2004) p.39) - "Hindu Synthesis" (Note: Hiltebeitel (2002)) (ca. 200 BCE - 300 CE) (Note: Michaels (2004) p.39) (Note: Hiltebeitel (2002)); Epics - Puranas - Ramayana - Mahabharata - Bhagavad Gita - Brahma Sutras - Smarta Tradition; Mahayana Buddhism					
2nd century BCE	Indo-Greek Kingdom		Shunga Empire; Maha-Meghavahana Dynasty			Satavahana dynasty Sangam period (300 BCE – 200 CE); Early Cholas; Early Pandyan kingdom Cheras
1st century BCE	Indo-Greek Kingdom		Shunga Empire; Maha-Meghavahana Dynasty			Satavahana dynasty Sangam period (300 BCE – 200 CE); Early Cholas; Early Pandyan kingdom Cheras
1st century CE	Indo-Scythians; Indo-Parthians		Kuninda Kingdom			Satavahana dynasty Sangam period (300 BCE – 200 CE); Early Cholas; Early Pandyan kingdom Cheras
2nd century	Kushan Empire					Satavahana dynasty Sangam period (300 BCE – 200 CE); Early Cholas; Early Pandyan kingdom Cheras
3rd century	Kushano-Sasanian Kingdom; Western Satraps	Kushan Empire		Kamarupa kingdom	Adivasi (tribes)	Satavahana dynasty Sangam period (300 BCE – 200 CE); Early Cholas; Early Pandyan kingdom Cheras
Culture	"Golden Age of Hinduism"(ca. CE 320-650) (Note: Michaels (2004) p.40); Puranas - Kural; Co-existence of Hinduism and Buddhism					
4th century	Kidarites	Gupta Empire; Varman dynasty				Andhra Ikshvakus; Kalabhra dynasty Kadamba Dynasty; Western Ganga Dynasty
5th century	Hephthalite Empire	Alchon Huns				Vishnukundina; Kalabhra dynasty
6th century	Nezak Huns; Kabul Shahi; Maitraka				Adivasi (tribes)	Vishnukundina; Badami Chalukyas; Kalabhra dynasty
Culture	Late-Classical Hinduism (ca. CE 650-1100) (Note: Michaels (2004) p.41); Advaita Vedanta - Tantra; Decline of Buddhism in India					
7th century	Indo-Sassanids		Vakataka dynasty Empire of Harsha	Mlechchha dynasty	Adivasi (tribes)	Badami Chalukyas; Eastern Chalukyas; Pandyan kingdom (revival); Pallava
7th century	Karkota dynasty				Adivasi (tribes)	
8th century	Kabul Shahi	Pala Empire			Adivasi (tribes)	Eastern Chalukyas; Pandyan kingdom Kalachuri
9th century	Gurjara-Pratihara				Adivasi (tribes)	Rashtrakuta Empire; Eastern Chalukyas; Pandyan kingdom Medieval Cholas; Chera Perumals of Makkotai
10th century	Ghaznavids			Pala dynasty Kamboja-Pala dynasty	Adivasi (tribes)	Kalyani Chalukyas; Eastern Chalukyas; Medieval Cholas; Chera Perumals of Makkotai; Rashtrakuta
References and sources for table References Sources: Flood, Gavin D. (1996), An Introduction to Hinduism, Cambridge University Press; Hiltebeitel, Alf (2002), Hinduism. In: Joseph Kitagawa, "The Religious Traditions of Asia: Religion, History, and Culture", Routledge; Michaels, Axel (2004), Hinduism. Past and present, Princeton, New Jersey: Princeton University Press
