= Palacenti =

Palacenti was an ancient town of Drangiana in southwest Afghanistan. It is located above Tazarene on the Etymandrus river.
