= Weer Rajendra Rishi =

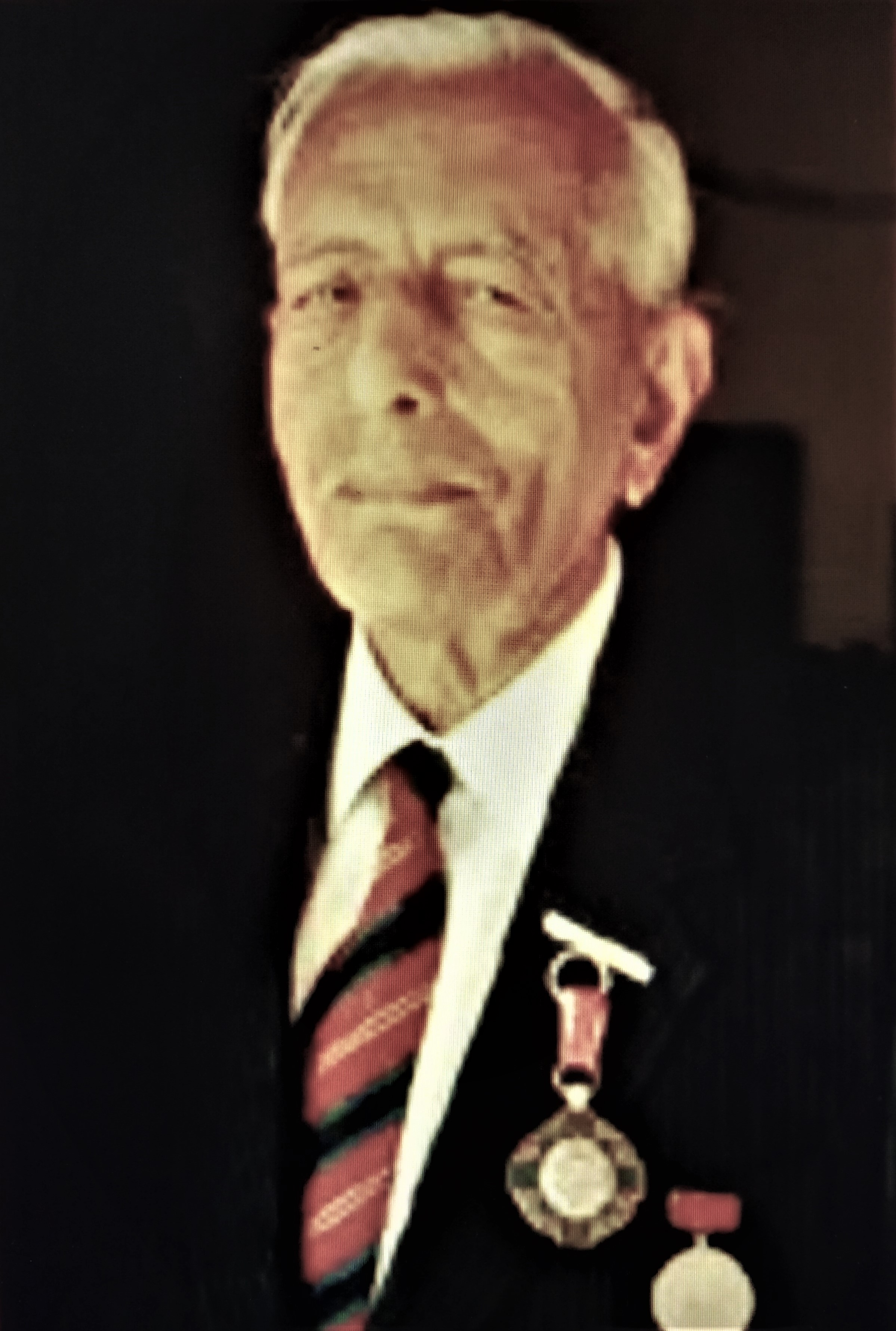
- Dr. Weer Rajendra Rishi in a formal event
- Born: 4 January 1917 Makrampur, Patiala State, British India
- Died: 1 December 2002 (aged 85) Chandigarh, India
- Occupation: Linguist; Diplomatic Translator; Professor
- Language: English; Hindi; Punjabi; Russian; Romani

Weer Rajendra Rishi (4 January 1917 (Note: According to the source,"Rishi was born Waliati Ram Rishi on September 23, 1917, at Makarampur, Patiala, but the date was officially recorded as January 4, 1917, which he always stated as his birthday.")– 1 December 2002) was an Indian linguist, diplomatic translator, and Romani studies scholar.

Rishi was born Waliati Ram Rishi in Makarampur, Punjab on 23 September 1917. He married in 1938 and entered the civil service soon thereafter. He changed his given names to Weer Rajendra in 1948. He completed an MA in Russian language and literature, and in 1950, another MA in English at Nagpur University.

Rishi worked in the Indian Embassy at Moscow (1950–1952) and later, at the Indian High Commissions at Singapore (1962–1965) and London (1969–1971). His Russian language skills allowed him to work as interpreter for various Soviet dignitaries including Khrushchev, Marshal Bulganin, Marshal Voroshilov, Marshal Zakharov and Prime Minister Alexei Kosygin. He also served as an interpreter for the ex-President of India, Dr. Rajendra Prasad, on an official visit to the Soviet Union in 1960. Rishi retired from the Indian Foreign Service in 1973.

Rishi then served as the director of the Indian Institute of Romani Studies at Chandigarh and the editor of Roma - Half-Yearly Journal on the Life, Language and Culture of Roma. He was later named Honorary President of the International Romani Union.

He died in Chandigarh on December 1, 2002, aged 85.

== Honours ==
Rishi received India's Padma Shri award in 1970. He also received a National Millennium Award at the Millennium World Hindi Conference in 2000.

== Bibliography ==
- Hindi translation of Alexander Pushkin's poem The Gypsies (1955)
- Russian-Hindi Dictionary, with foreword by the late Pandit Jawaharlal Nehru (Naʼī Dihlī : Sāhitya Akādemī, 1957)
- Russian Grammar [in Hindi]
- Russian Folklore [in Hindi]
- Marriages of the Orient (Singapore: Chopmen Enterprises, 1970)
- History of Russian literature [in Hindi] (1972)
- Roma - The Panjabi Emigrants in Europe, Central and Middle Asia, the USSR, and the Americas (Patiala: Punjabi University, 1976 & 1996)
- Multilingual Romani Dictionary [Romani/English/Hindi/Russian/French] (Chandigarh, India: Roma Publications, 1974)
- Romani-Punjabi-English Conversation Book(Patial, India: Language Dept., Punjab, 1980)
- Romani-Punjabi-English Dictionary (Patial, India: Language Dept., Punjab, 1981)
- India & Russia - Linguistic & Cultural Affinity (Chandigarh, India: Roma Publications, 1982)
- Gandamula To Sumeru [his autobiography] (Chandigarh, India: Roma Publications, 1992)
- Learn Romani - set of 20 lessons
