= Tazarene =

Tazarene was an ancient town of Drangiana in southwest Afghanistan. It is located above Alexandria of the Caucasus on the Etymandrus river.
