= Sigal, Sakastan =

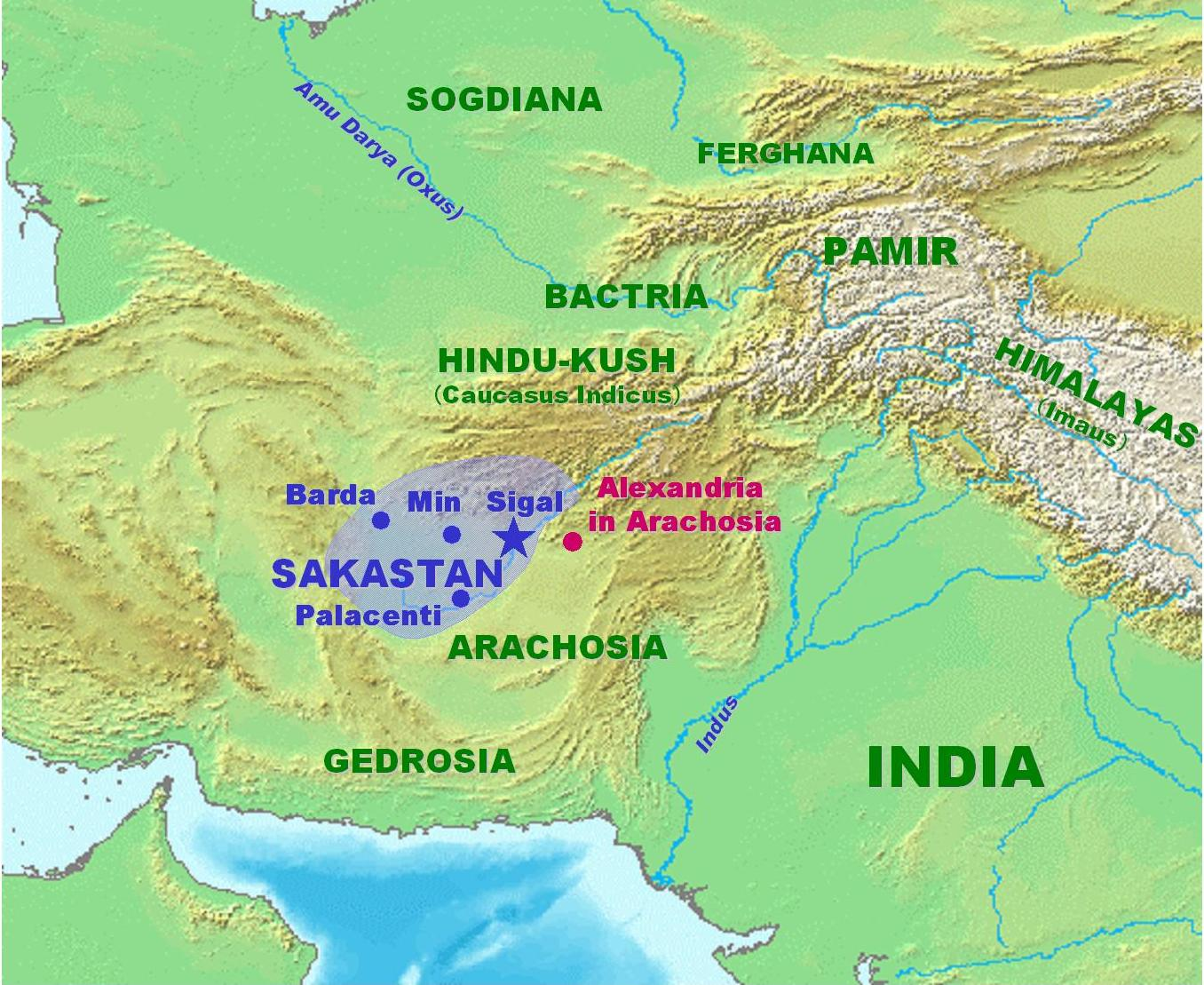
Map of Sakastan, with the capital Sigal.

Sigal was a city of the Helmund valley in south-west Afghanistan (ancient Sacastene).

The presence of the Sakas in Sakastan in the 1st century BCE, with their capital at Sigal, is mentioned by Isidore of Charax in his "Parthian stations". He explained that they were bordered at that time by Greek cities to the east (Alexandria of the Caucasus and Alexandria of the Arachosians), and the Parthian-controlled territory of Arachosia to the south:

"Beyond is Sacastana of the Scythian Sacae, which is also Paraetacena, 63 schoeni. There are the city of Barda and the city of Min and the city of Palacenti and the city of Sigal; in that place is the royal residence of the Sacae; and nearby is the city of Alexandria (and nearby is the city of Alexandropolis), and six villages." Parthian stations, 18.
