= Mahrampur =

- Village
- Location in Punjab, India Mahrampur (India)
- Coordinates: 31.0753029°N 76.042471°E
- Country: India
- State: Punjab
- District: Shaheed Bhagat Singh Nagar

Government
  - Type: Panchayat raj
  - Body: Gram panchayat
- Elevation: 251 m (823 ft)

Population (2011)
  - Total: 622
- Sex ratio 316/306 ♂/♀

Languages
  - Official: Punjabi
- Time zone: UTC+5:30 (IST)
- PIN: 144518
- Telephone code: 01823
- ISO 3166 code: IN-PB
- Post office: Garcha
- Website: nawanshahr.nic.in

Mahrampur is a village in Shaheed Bhagat Singh Nagar district of Punjab State, India. It is located 1.9 kilometres (1.2 mi) away from post office Garcha, 9.4 kilometres (5.8 mi) from Nawanshahr, 3.9 kilometres (2.4 mi) from district headquarter Shaheed Bhagat Singh Nagar and 96.7 kilometres (60.1 mi) from state capital Chandigarh. The village is administrated by Sarpanch an elected representative of the village.

== Demography ==
As of 2011, Mahrampur has a total number of 133 houses and population of 622 of which 316 include are males while 306 are females according to the report published by Census India in 2011. The literacy rate of Mahrampur is 80.63%, higher than the state average of 75.84%. The population of children under the age of 6 years is 85 which is 13.67% of total population of Mahrampur, and child sex ratio is approximately 1297 as compared to Punjab state average of 846.

Most of the people are from Schedule Caste which constitutes 64.79% of total population in Mahrampur. The town does not have any Schedule Tribe population so far.

As per the report published by Census India in 2011, 182 people were engaged in work activities out of the total population of Mahrampur which includes 172 males and 10 females. According to census survey report 2011, 56.04% workers describe their work as main work and 43.96% workers are involved in Marginal activity providing livelihood for less than 6 months.

== Education ==
KC Engineering College and Doaba Khalsa Trust Group Of Institutions are the nearest colleges. Industrial Training Institute for women (ITI Nawanshahr) is 11 kilometres (6.8 mi). The village is 73 kilometres (45 mi) away from Chandigarh University, 55 kilometres (34 mi) from Indian Institute of Technology and 47 kilometres (29 mi) away from Lovely Professional University.

List of schools nearby:

- Dashmesh Model School, Kahma
- Govt Primary School, Kahlon
- Govt High School, Garcha

== Transport ==
Nawanshahr train station is the nearest train station however, Garhshankar Junction railway station is 22 kilometres (14 mi) away from the village. Sahnewal Airport is the nearest domestic airport which located 54 kilometres (34 mi) away in Ludhiana and the nearest international airport is located in Chandigarh also Sri Guru Ram Dass Jee International Airport is the second nearest airport which is 156 kilometres (97 mi) away in Amritsar.

== See also ==
- List of villages in India
