= Coinage of Asia =

The earliest coinage of Asia is also the oldest coinage of the world. Coins were invented several times independently of each other. The earliest coins from the Mediterranean region are from the kingdom of Lydia, and are now dated ca. 600 BCE. The dating of the earliest coins of China and India is difficult and the subject of debate. Nevertheless, the first coins of China are at least as old as the earliest Lydian coins and possibly older, while the earliest coins of India seems to have appeared at a later stage.

Pre-modern Chinese coins were always cast bronze or brass issues. This concept was later adopted by Japan, Korea and Annam (Vietnam), and also influenced regions in South-East Asia.

The Lydian coins consisted of discs or lumps of electrum (a natural gold/silver alloy), and were stamped on two sides with dies. This concept spread rapidly to neighbouring Greek city states in Asia Minor and across the Aegean Sea, and eventually throughout the Mediterranean. When Lydia was conquered by Achaemenid Persia, the production of Lydian coins continued in the guise of silver Siglos and gold Darics. Other parts of Persia only began to mint coins at the time of Alexander the Great's conquest.

Coinage of India began in the 7th century BCE, as small native states known as the Mahajanapadas began to mint coins of silver. The concept of coinage, and many design elements, spread across the Indian subcontinent within centuries. India subsequently absorbed and modified numerous influences, including Greek, Roman, Arabic and Persian.

== Coinage of East Asia ==
=== China ===
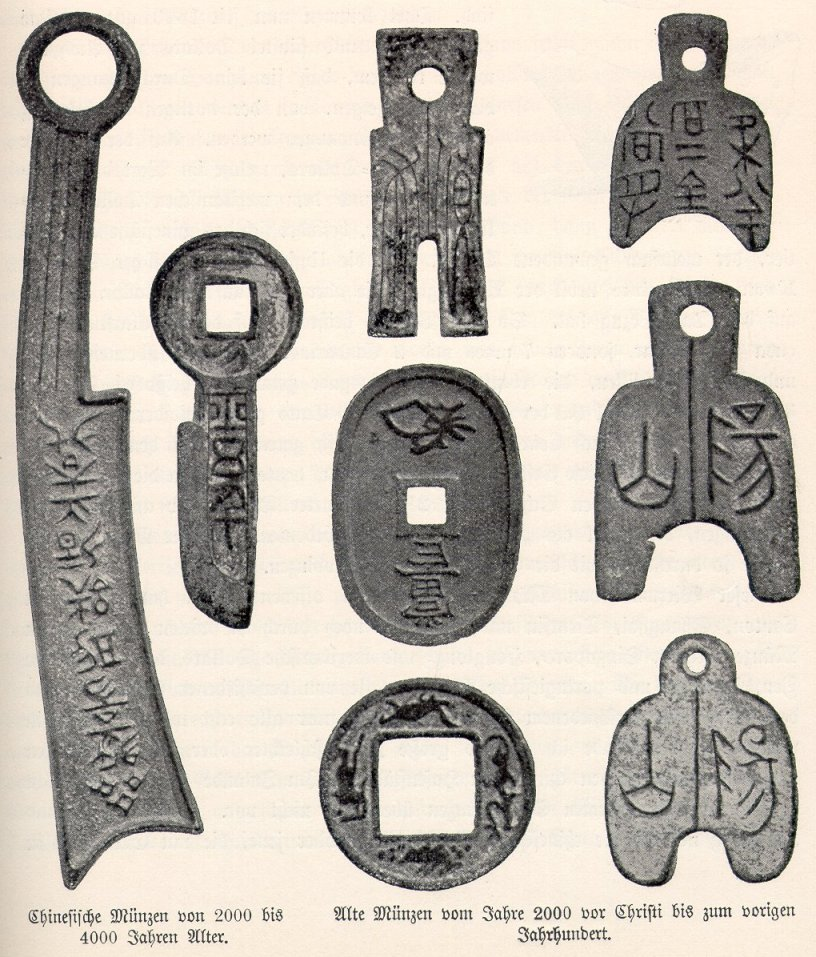
Ancient Chinese knife and spade coins of the Zhou and Xin dynasties, Japanese Tenpō Tsūhō and some others. Some appear to be forgeries.

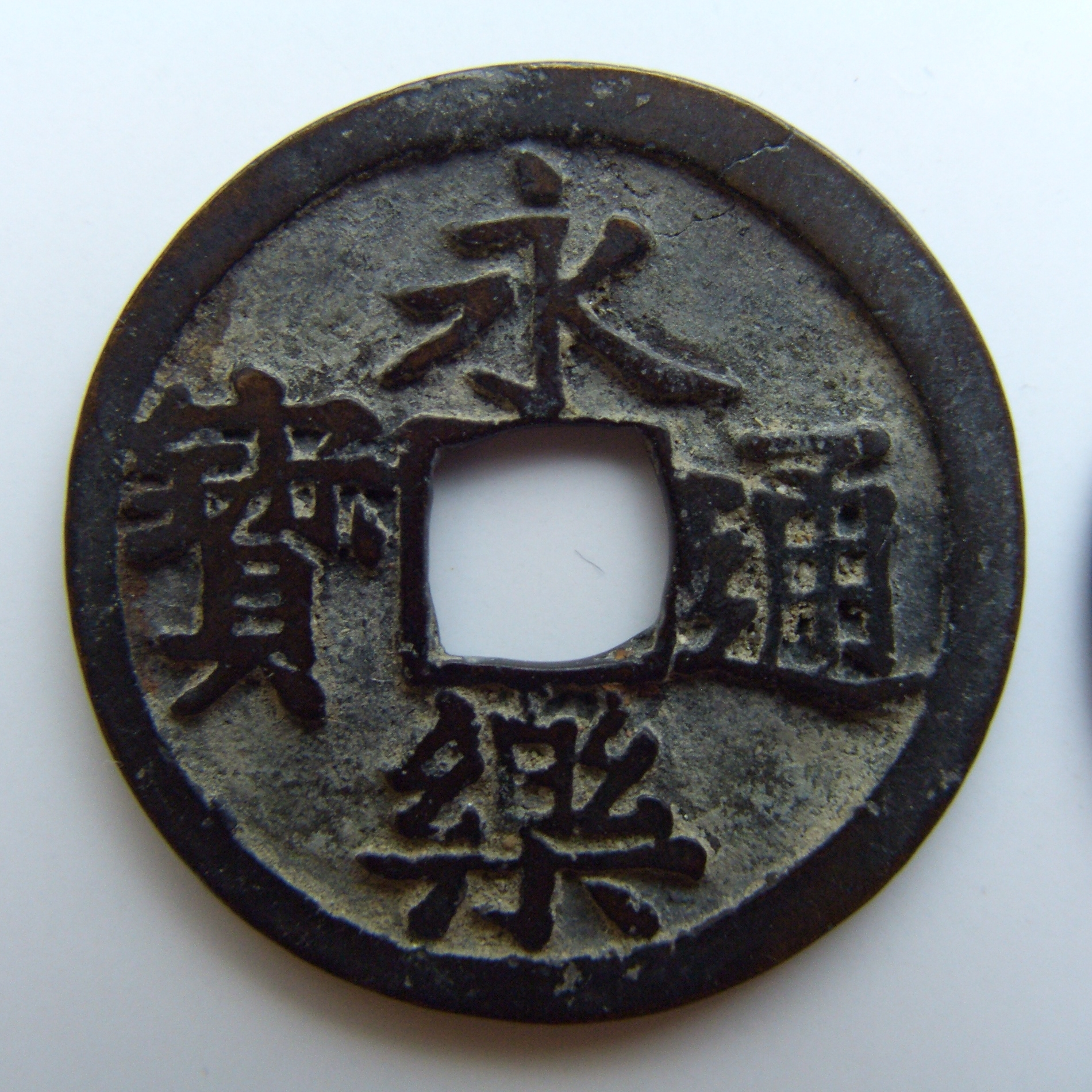
A Chinese coin of the Ming dynasty, inscribed 永樂通寶 (Yong Le tong bao) or Yong Le currency. Yong Le was the regnal name of Emperor Zhu Di (1402–24).

Some time around the 7th century BCE, coins shaped like utensils emerged in China. In most regions, spade-shaped coins were issued, while knife-shaped coins were issued in the North-East. In the state of Chu (in Southern China), small oval bronze pieces were issued. Numismatists and archaeologists believe that the minting of coins was not organized by the central authority, i.e. the royal court of Zhou. The spade and knife coins underwent a number of changes in size, shape and inscriptions.

Cowrie shells are found in archaeological excavations that date back to the Shang era (2nd millennium BCE). These might have been used as currency, but there is not agreement as to whether they did serve a currency purpose or not. Various other bronze artifacts have been described as money (e.g. "bridge money"); these are now believed to be various types of ornaments, not related to currency.

During the 4th century BCE, a new type of coins, the "ban liang" type, was introduced in the Western state of Qin. The ban liang coins were round, cast bronze coins with a hole in the center, inscribed "ban liang", or half liang (a weight unit). Qin eventually conquered the other states of China and replaced the defunct Zhou dynasty with the Qin dynasty in 221 BCE. The monetary systems of China were now standardized, based on the Qin model, and knife and spade coins were replaced with ban liang coins. The round, cast base metal coins of the Far East are known as cash coins. The cash coins were customarily strung together with hempen threads into standard-size strings of cash, representing a fixed value.

In 118 BCE, the ban liang coins were replaced by another type, the "wu zhu" type, that was inscribed "wu zhu", or five zhu (another weight unit). These were minted until 621 CE, shortly after the establishment of the Tang dynasty. Being minted for almost a thousand years combined, the ban liang and wu zhu coins come in a great number of varieties. The uncovering of the history of these varieties is an ongoing process.

The coins issued during the Tang dynasty were unusual in their day, in the sense that the obverse inscription consisted of four characters instead of two. The "Kai Yuan tong bao" coins were minted throughout the Tang era, and subsequent Chinese coin issues (up to around 1900) were based on this precedent.

During the Song, Ming and Qing dynasties, the first two (out of four) characters of the obverse inscription represented the name of the current regnal era, thereby indicating the emperor under which the individual coin was minted. A system of discrete calligraphical variation was employed, thereby facilitating identification of the mint that was responsible for minting any given coin. During the Song and Ming dynasties, the reverse was often blank, although some carry the regnal year of the emperor or some other inscription. During the Qing dynasty, the reverse explicitly indicated the mint, initially in Chinese, but later in Manchu. Unlike the Song and Ming dynasties, Qing dynasty coins come in one denomination only until the mid 19th century. During the Taiping Rebellion, inflated large size coins (e.g. coins representing 50 or 100 cash/units) were minted.

During the colonial era, foreign silver coins entered China 1. Traditionally, China did not have a silver coinage, although silver was stored in the shape of silver bars (so-called sycees). As the Chinese harbours were forcibly opened for foreign trade by the colonial powers, foreign silver coins poured into China, and profoundly altered the monetary system and modes of economic transaction. The production of traditional cash coins ceased, and various provinces began, during the 1880s, to acquire modern equipment, capable of minting modern Western style coinage, akin to the coinage that was being introduced through foreign trade. This put the traditional cash coinage to rest, while the modern coinage of China began.

=== Japan ===
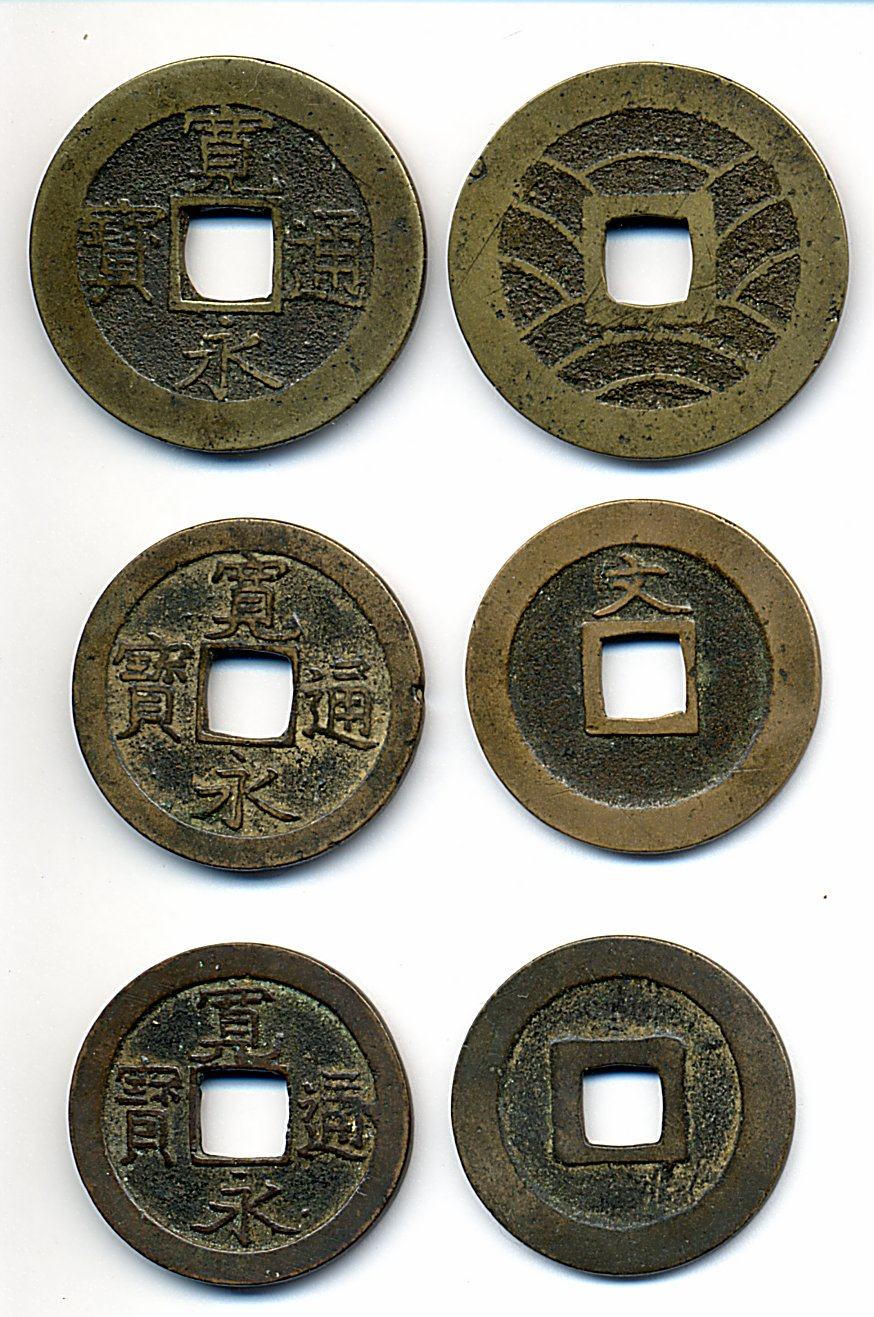
Japanese coins of the 17th to 19th centuries

Coinage in Japan initially consisted of Chinese coins that arrived in Japan through trade. It is not clear when the influx of Chinese coins began. In the late 7th century CE, domestically minted coins commenced. Such domestically minted coins, modelled on the Tang dynasty precedent, continued to be emitted until 958. These coins were minted in comparatively small numbers and amounted only to a supplement, not an alternative, to the imported coins. For centuries to come, there was no domestic Japanese coinage, except some interimistically manufactured reproductions of pre-existing coin types. Cash coins were known as "mon" in Japanese.

Only with the unification of Japan achieved by Oda Nobunaga, Toyotomi Hideyoshi and Tokugawa Ieyasu (late 16th, early 17th centuries), a proud domestic coinage was revived. Base metal coins were modelled on the Chinese cash type, while various types of standardized silver and gold bars served as precious metal currency. Such coins continued to be minted until the 1860s, when the Shogunate was abolished and a series of modernizing reforms began, including modernization of Japanese currency.

=== Korea ===
Issues based on the Chinese cash were issued from 1888 to 1892 of 1 hwan = 1000 mun or cash. Replaced in 1892 with 1 hwan = 5 yang.

=== Tibet ===
Tibetan coins were struck in Lhasa and in the Kong-po province between 1763 and 1954. Since 1959 Chinese currency replaces that of Tibet.

== Coinage of South Asia ==
=== India ===
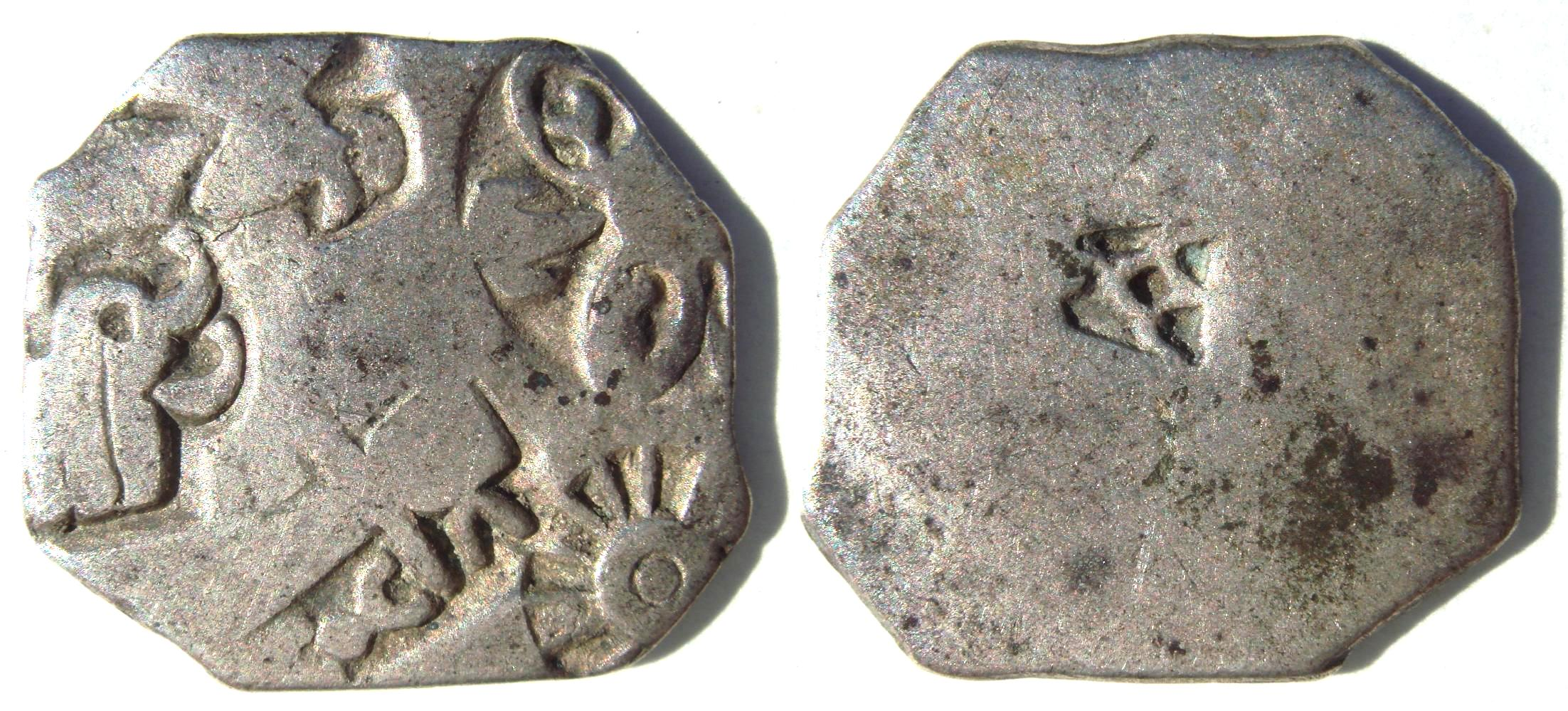
A punch-marked coin from the Nanda Empire.

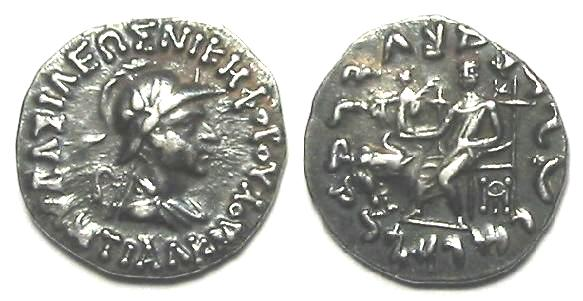
A silver drachm of king Antialkidas (c. 145–135 B.C.), an Indo-Greek ruler in the Indus region.

The first Indian coins were either round, square or long sticks of silver with punch marks issued under various kingdoms starting from around 600 BCE onwards. Issuers included Kashi, Kosala, the Magadha Empire, Kuru, Panchala, Taxila, Gandhara, Kamboja, Avanti in the Narbada Valley, Saurashtra Peninsula, and the Eastern Deccan. The first coins issued by a unified Indian empire was from the Maurya Empire, though they were similar to the older issues. During the 4th century BC, after Alexander the Great's conquest of the Indus Valley and Punjab region, the Greek currency Drachma was introduced and was carried on by Bactria, Indo-Scythians and Kushans. All these were of the Attica weight standard.

== Coinage of Southeast Asia ==
=== Funan, Dvaravat and Khmer Empires ===
Not much is known of the currency of the Funan, Dvaravati, Chenla or Kambuja in Cambodia and the Khmer Empire from 100 to 1370 CE. The origin of the coins were based on ancient Indian coinage that has been more stylised over the millennia. Funan and Dvaravat coins were silver and bronze or brass. Khmer coins were made of lead and came in 3 weights, 1unit, 3unit and 6unit, a 10unit coin may exist but is debatable. There is not much variation to these coins when compared to Indian coinage, Roman coinage or Greek coins.

=== Annam ===
pope coins were based on the Chinese cash coinage, mostly imitations at first then issued with Chinese characters but in Vietnamese.

=== Indonesia/Malaysia region ===
These coins were mainly issued by the Chinese diaspora and Islamic sultanates all over the Indonesian archipelago who minted coins based mainly on the Chinese cash coinage.

== See also ==
- Chinese tael
- Chinese yuan
- Achaemenid currency
- Seleucid coinage
- Nabataean coinage
- Historical money of Tibet
- Silk Road Numismatics
- Yarmaq
