= Coinage of India =

Coinage of India

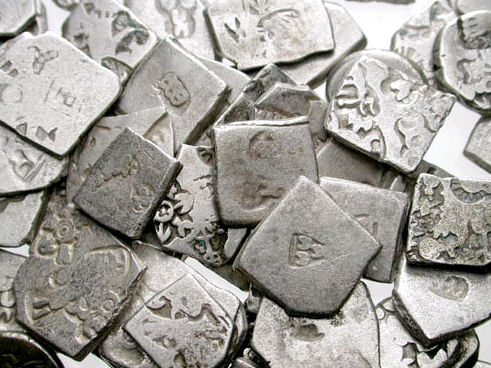
Hoard of mostly Maurya Empire coins

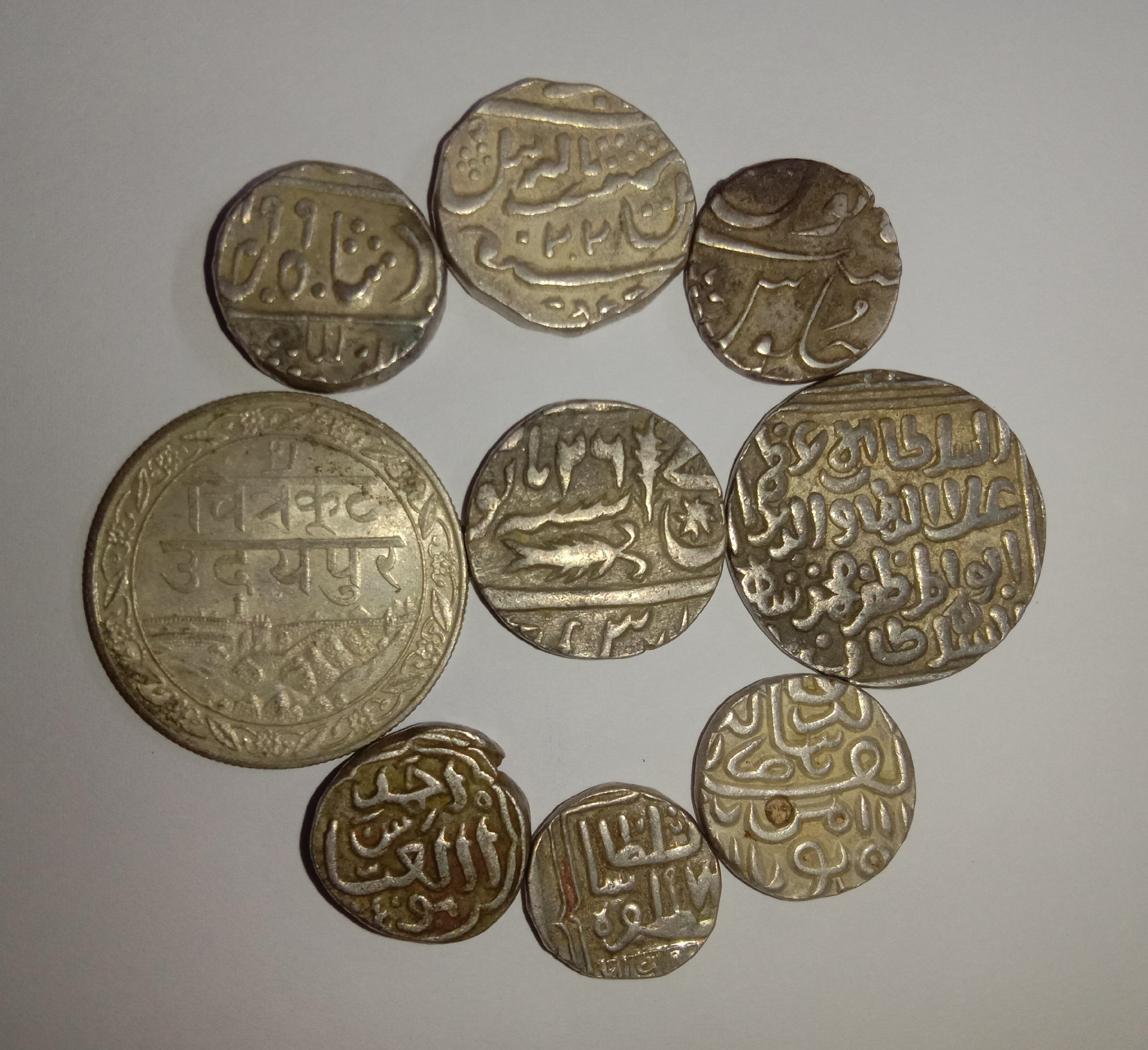
Silver Tanka and Rupee coins from different sultanates and princely states of India

The Coinage of India began anywhere between early 1st millennium BCE to the 6th century BCE, and consisted mainly of copper and silver coins in its initial stage. The coins of this period were Karshapanas or Pana. A variety of earliest Indian coins, however, unlike those circulated in West Asia, were stamped bars of metal, suggesting that the innovation of stamped currency was added to a pre-existing form of token currency which had already been present in the Janapadas and Mahajanapada kingdoms of the Early historic India. The kingdoms that minted their own coins included Gandhara, Kuntala, Kuru, Magadha, Panchala, Shakya, Surasena, Surashtra and Vidarbha etc.

The tradition of Indian coinage in the 2nd millennium evolved with Indo Islamic rule in India. and the British Raj in the 19th century.

== Origin of currency in Indian subcontinent ==
=== Prehistoric and Bronze Age origins ===
Cowry shells were first used in India as commodity money. The Indus Valley Civilisation may have used metals of fixed weights such as silver for trade activities which is evident from the DK area of Mohenjo Daro from the late Harappan period (dated 1900–1800 BC or 1750 BC). D.D Kosambi proposed a connection between Mohenjodaro class IV silver pieces and class D pieces with the Punch marked coins based on their remarkable similarity and identity between D-class weights. The remarkable similarities between Punch marked coin symbols with those appearing in the Indus seals have also been highlighted. Chalcolithic unmarked gold disc discovered from Eran have been dated to 1000 BC and due to their lack of ornamental use, it has been proposed that it was utilized as an object of money A similar gold token piece from Pandu Rajar Dhibi has also been interpreted as a coin, it is hammered on the edges and bears parallel marks, although weighing 14 grams, a quarter of the piece is missing hence its full weight of 21 grams would conform to the ancient coinage weight standards of India and confirm the vedic literary references of circulation of gold tokens in that period. Similar interpretations have been made regarding the use of silver circular objects from the Gungeria hoard.

=== Weight standard ===
Since the Bronze Age, ratti (0.11 or 0.12 gram) or the weight of the Gunja seeds have been used as a base unit for the measurement of mass in the Indus Valley civilization, the smallest weight of Indus was equal to 8 rattis (0.856 gram) and the binary system was used for the multiple of weights for instance 1:2:4:8:16:32, the 16th ratio being the standard regular weight (16 × smallest weight), etc. This weight system seems to have been replicated in the earliest Indian coins. The Masha coins were quarter Karshapanas, karshapanas themselves being the quarter value of Karsha (13.7 gram, 128 ratti) or 32 ratti which is the same as the regular weight used in the Indus Valley civilization. This standard (of 32 rattis) has been declared as Purana or Dharana by Kautilya. The Karsha weight differed based on the differing values of mashas, for instance arthashastra mentions a masha equal to 5 ratti as opposed to 8 ratti mashas which is described as the prevalent standard during Kautilya's time. The Gandharan quarter svarna coins conform to a different 5 ratti mashas system mentioned in the Arthashastra as do the copper punch marked coins (80 ratti, 146 grain, 9.46 gram). A shatamana (lit. 100 units) weight system has been first mentioned in Satapatha Brahmana which is equal to 100 krishnalas, each krishnala being equal to one ratti. The weight of the ancient Indian silver Karshapana and satamana coin is given below:

1 Satamana = 100 Rattis / 11 grams of pure silver

1 Karshapana = 32 Rattis/ 3.3 grams of pure silver

½ Karshapana = 16 Rattis

¼ Karshapana (masha) = 8 Rattis

1/8 Karshapana = 4 Rattis

=== Early literary references ===
There is evidence of countable units of precious metal being used for exchange from the Vedic period onwards. A term Nishka appears in this sense in the Rigveda. Later texts speak of cows given as gifts being adorned with pandas of gold. A pāda, literally a quarter, would have been a quarter of some standard weight. A unit called Stamina, literally a 'hundred standard', representing 100th krishnadas is mentioned in Satapatha Brahmana. A later commentary on Katyayana Suryaputra explains that a Stamina could also be a 100 rattis. All these units referred to gold currency in some form but they were later adopted to silver currency.

Panini's grammar text indicates that these terms continued to be used into the historical period. He mentions that something worth a nishka is called naishka and something worth a Śatamāna is called a Śatamānam etc. The units were also used to represent the assets of individuals, naishka‐śatika or naishka‐sahasrika (some one worth a hundred nishkas or a thousand nishkas).

Panini uses the term rūpa to mean a piece of precious metal (typically silver) used as a coin, and a rūpya to mean a stamped piece of metal, a coin in the modern sense. The term rūpya continues into the modern usage as the rupee.

Ratti based measurement is the oldest measurement system in the Indian subcontinent. The smallest weight in the Indus Valley civilization was equal to 8 rattis and were the bases for the weight standards for the first Indian coins in the seventh century BC. Ratti and is still used in India as Jewellers weight.

=== Theory of West Asian influences ===
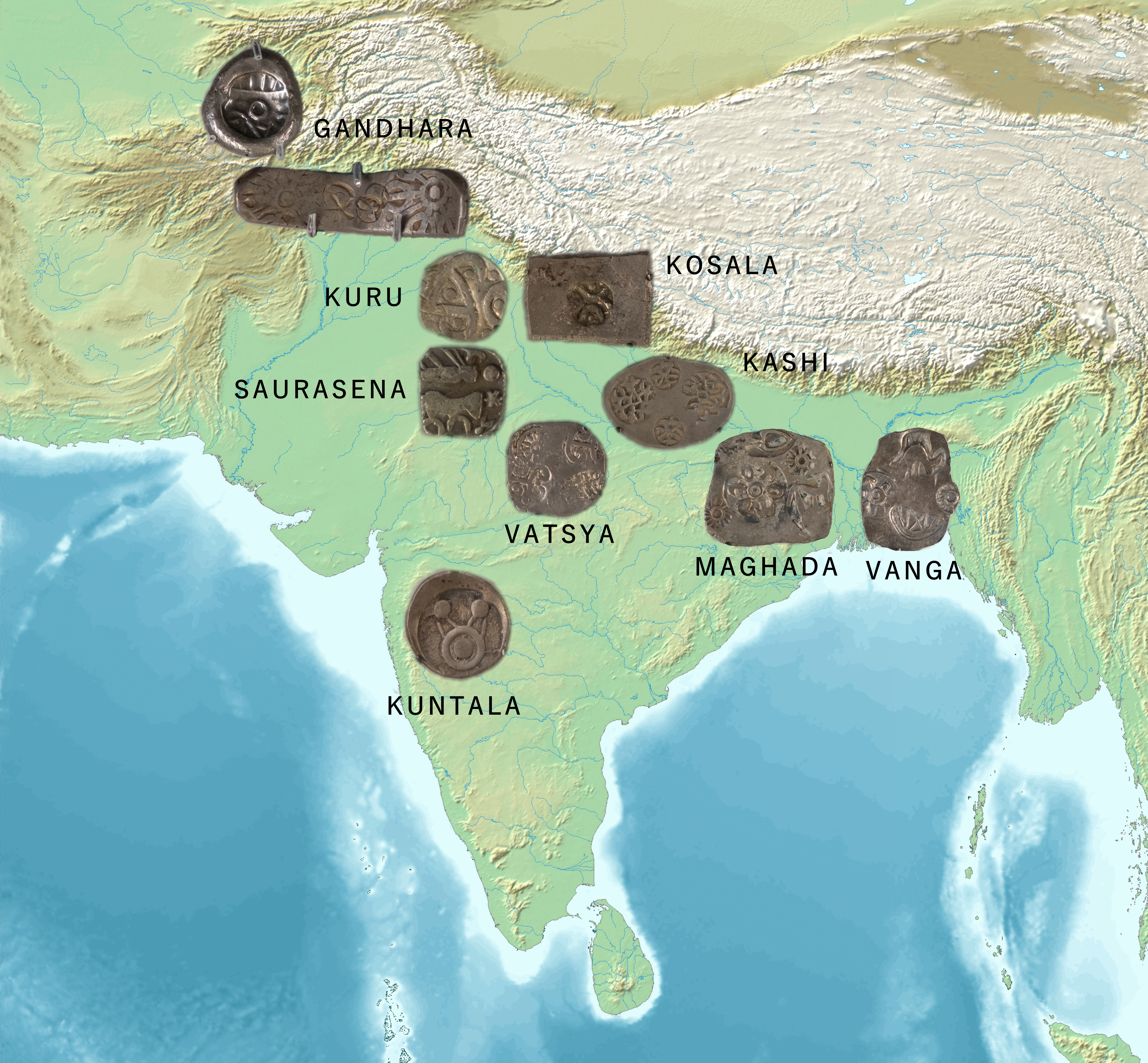
"The First South Asian coins", 400–300 BCE, British Museum.

Scholars remain divided over the origins of Indian punch-marked coinage (PMC). What is known, however, is that the earliest extant evidence, of silver currency, are bent silver bars, in the North West of the sub-continent, and consistent with those found in Iran, from the 7th century BCE Nush-i-jan hoard, and the 4th Century BCE, Chaman Huzuri (Kabul) hoard. Extant evidence of the earliest Metal currency in the South and East of India is later than the North West, and coeval with the Northern Black Polished Ware culture, minted before the Maurya Empire (322–185 BCE), with radio carbon dating indicating post 5th century BCE dates. According to some scholars minted coins spread to the Indo-Gangetic Plain from West Asia.

According to Joe Cribb (2003), a "marriage between Greek coinage and Iranian bar currency" was at the origin of Indian punch-marked coins, which used minting technology derived from Greek coinage. Daniel Schlumberger also considers that punch-marked bars, similar to the many punch-marked bars found in northwestern India, initially originated in the Achaemenid Empire, rather than in the Indian heartland:

“The punch-marked bars were up to now considered to be Indian (...) However the weight standard is considered by some expert to be Persian, and now that we see them also being uncovered in the soil of Afghanistan, we must take into account the possibility that their country of origin should not be sought beyond the Indus, but rather in the oriental provinces of the Achaemenid Empire"

— Daniel Schlumberger, quoted from Trésors Monétaires, p.42.

The Western origins hypothesis had previously been proposed before any serious attempts were made in the study of PMC coins such as:

- John Allan (1936), asserted "the idea of a coinage came to India in the late fifth or early fourth century B. C. from Achaemenid territory, conjecturing that the bent bar or wheel-marked coins "were struck on a Persian standard and represented double sigloi or staters....". Arguing no evidence coinage, in India, exists before the Nanda period, with the earliest finds from: Golakpur, Paila, and Set Mahet indicating the region in which local punch-marked coins originated.
- James Kennedy (1898), the PMC were copied form Babylonian originals as a result of trade between India and Babylon in the 6th century BC.
- James Princep (1835), who proposed the Greo-Bactrian (256-100 BCE) origin of the PMC coins, this was also supported by C.W King. Princep later admitted that due to the archaic nature of PMC, they were older than the Greo-Bactrian coinage.

The weight standard of the Gandharan, Shatamana, Bent Bar coins is asserted, by like of Cribb, Allan, and Schlumberger, as twice the Sigloi weight and hence represent the Persian weight standards. Other scholars such as Vincent Smith recognised the Satamana as 100 ratti weight system of Iron Age in India.

Cunningham (1891) asserts that ancient India had an abundance of gold but little silver. The gold to silver ratio in India was 10 to 1 or 8 to 1. In contrast, in the neighbouring Persia, it was 13 to 1. This value differential would have incentivised the exchange of gold for silver, resulting in an increasing supply of silver in India.

==== Achaemenid coinage in northwestern India ====
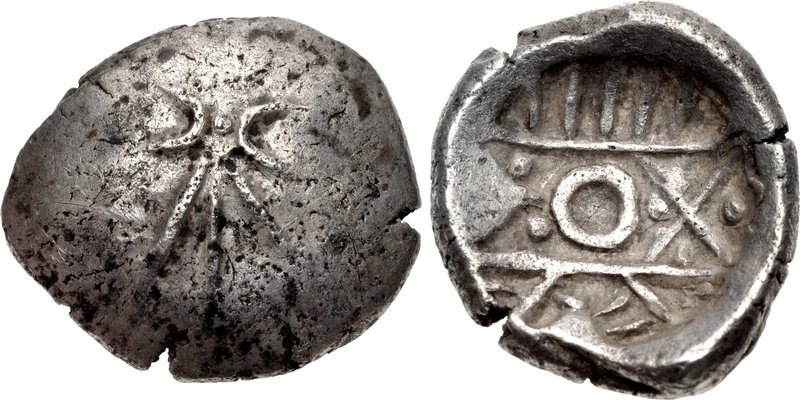
Punch-marked coin minted in the Kabul Valley under the Achaemenid administration. c. 500–380 BC, or c. 350 BCE.

Coin finds in the Chaman Hazouri hoard in Kabul or the Shaikhan Dehri hoard in Pushkalavati have revealed numerous Achaemenid coins as well as many Greek coins from the 5th and 4th centuries BCE were circulating in the area, at least as far as the Indus during the reign of the Achaemenids, who were in control of the areas as far as Gandhara. In 2007 a small coin hoard was discovered at the site of ancient Pushkalavati (Shaikhan Dehri) in Pakistan. The hoard contained a tetradrachm minted in Athens c. 500/490-485/0 BCE, together with a number of local types as well as silver cast ingots. The Athens coin is the earliest known example of its type to be found so far to the east.

== Early historic period (early 1st millennium BCE – 300 BCE) ==
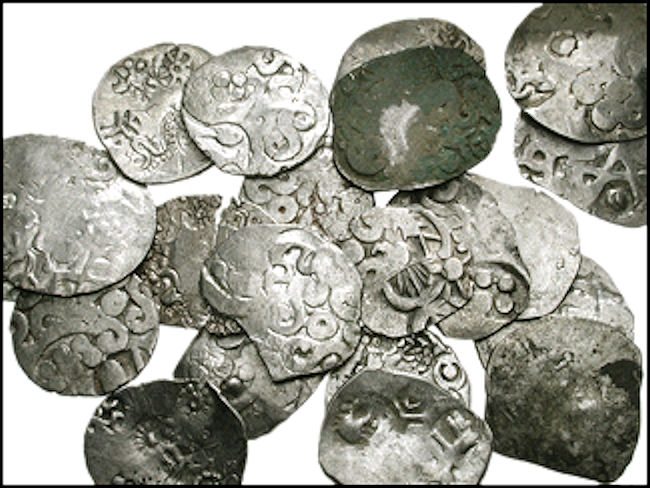
Kosala karshapanas. Circa 525–465 BC. Average diameter 25 mm, average weight 2.70 gram. Each piece with a variety of separate punch-marks applied to both sides.

=== Indian Punched mark Karshapana coins ===
Sometime around 600BC in the lower Ganges valley in eastern India a coin called a punchmarked Karshapana was created. According to Hardaker, T.R. the origin of Indian coins can be placed at 575 BCE and according to P.L. Gupta in the seventh century BCE, proposals for its origins range from 1000 BCE to 500 BCE. According to Page. E, Kasi, Kosala and Magadha coins can be the oldest ones from the Indian Subcontinent dating back to 7th century BC and kosambi findings indicate coin circulation towards the end of 7th century BC. It is also noted that some of the Janapadas like shakiya during Buddha's time were minting coins both made of silver and copper with their own marks on them.

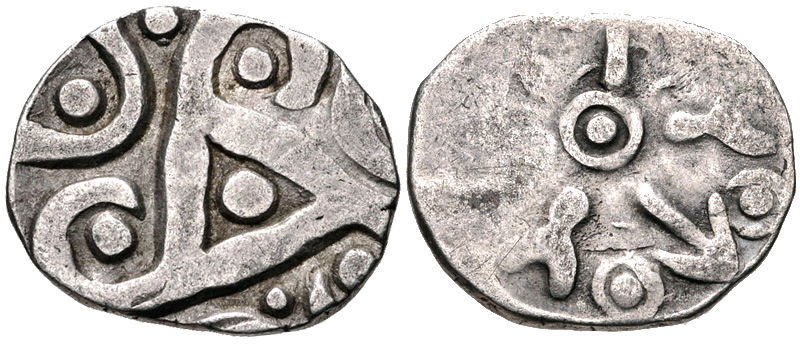
Kurus (Kurukshetras) circa 350–315 BCE

The study of the relative chronology of these coins has successfully established that the first punch-marked coins initially only had one or two punches, with the number of punches increasing over time.

The first PMC coins in India may have been minted around the 6th century BCE by the Mahajanapadas of the Indo-Gangetic Plain, The coins of this period were punch-marked coins called Puranas, old Karshapanas or Pana. Several of these coins had a single symbol, for example, Saurashtra had a humped bull, and Dakshin Panchala had a Swastika; Others, like Magadha had several symbols. These coins were made of silver of a standard weight but with an irregular shape. This was gained by cutting up silver bars and then making the correct weight by cutting the edges of the coin.

They are mentioned in the Manu, Panini, and Buddhist Jataka stories and lasted three centuries longer in the south than the north (600 BCE – 300 CE).

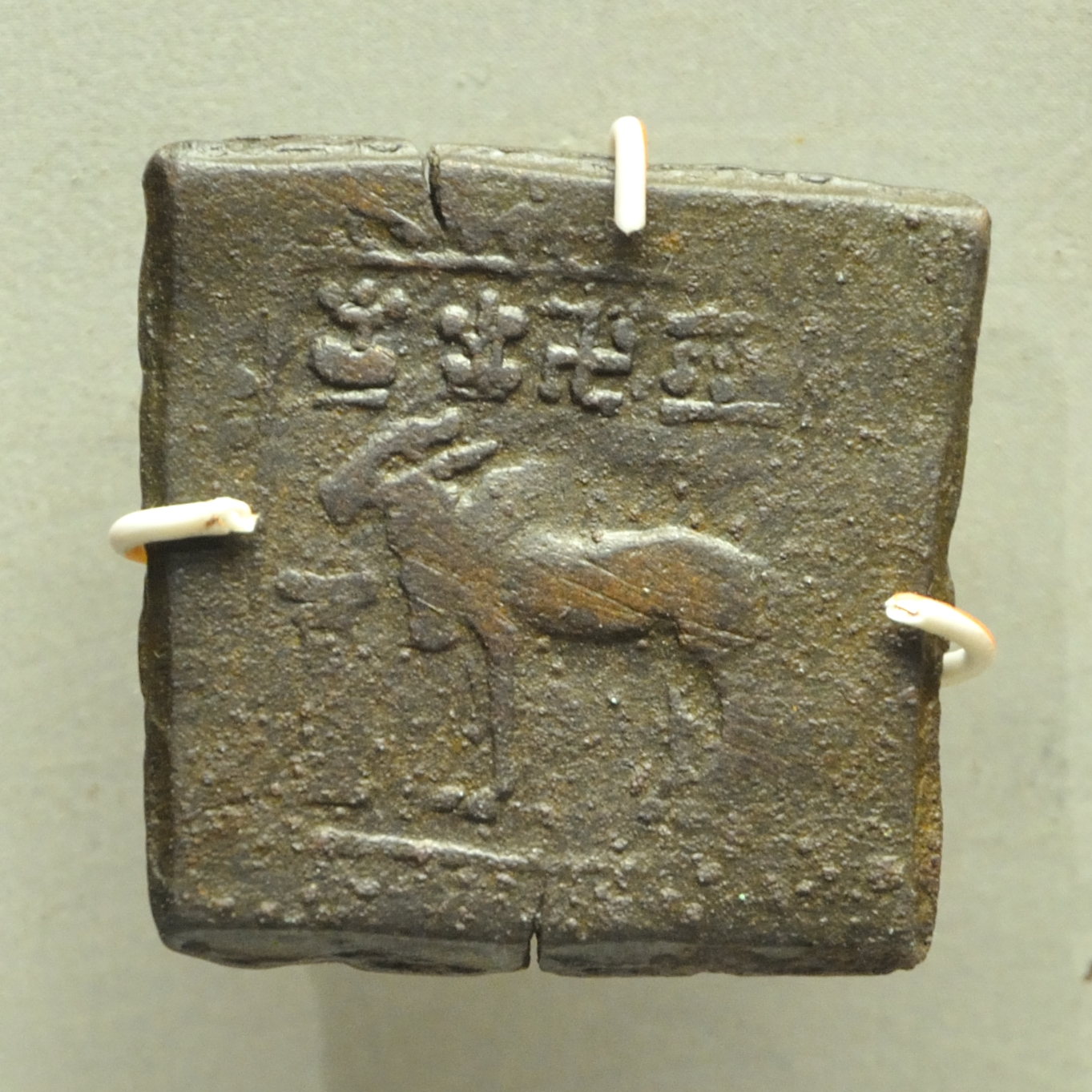
Cast Copper Coin C. 5-4th Century BCE-2nd Century CE

=== Uninscribed Cast Copper Coins ===
A small square bronze coin recovered from Pandu Rajar Dhibi has a primitive human figure on obverse and striations on reverse and may recall striated coins of Lydia and Ionia in 700 BC may well be dated before the punch marked coins of ancient India. Cast copper coins along with punch marked coins are the earliest examples of coinage in India, archaeologist G. R. Sharma based on his analysis from Kausambi dates them to pre Punched Marked Coins (PMC) era between 855 and 815 BC on the basis of obtaining them from pre NBPW period, while some date it to 500 BC and some date them to pre NBPW end of 7th century BC. Archaeological excavations have revealed these coins both from PMC and pre PMC era. The dating of these coins remain a controversy.

=== Die struck coins ===
According to some scholars Punch marked coins were replaced at the fall of the Maurya Empire by cast, die-struck coins. The coin devices are Indian, but it is thought that this coin technology was introduced from the West, either from the Achaemenid Empire or from the neighboring Greco-Bactrian Kingdom.

==== Saurashtra die struck coins (5th century – 4th century BC) ====
Saurashtra Janapada coins are probably the earliest die-struck figurative coins from ancient India from 450 to 300 BCE which are also perhaps the earliest source of Hindu representational forms. Most coins from Surashtra are approximately 1 gram in weight. Rajgor believes they are therefore quarter karshapanas of 8 rattis, or 0.93 gm. Mashakas of 2 rattis and double mashakas of 4 rattis are also known.

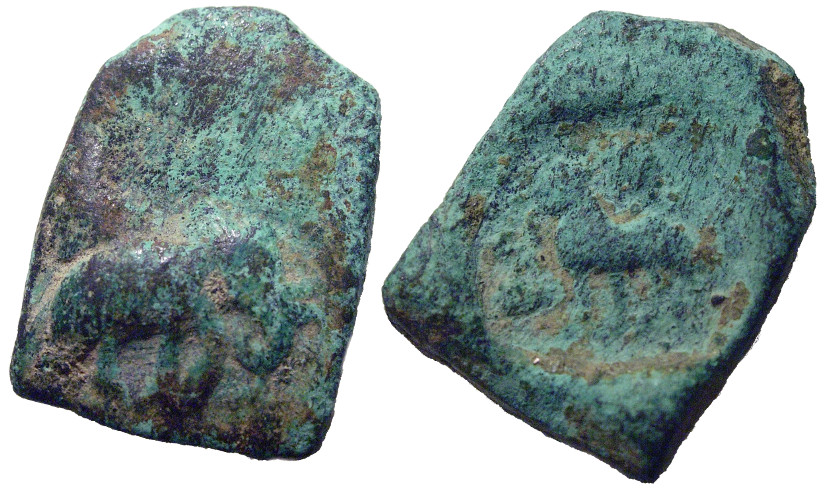
Copper Die struck Coin from Gandhara, c. 304–232 BC.

The coins appear to be uniface, in that there is a single die-struck symbol on one side. However, most of the coins appear to be overstruck over other Surashtra coins and thus there is often the remnant of a previous symbol on the reverse, as well as sometimes under the obverse symbol as well.

==== Uninscribed Die struck coins (4th century BC) ====
Uninscribed die struck coins appeared around 4th century BC in Taxila and Ujjain. These coins were mostly in copper and rarely in silver, the metal dies were cast carefully with the required designs. These coins had some symbols similar to Punch marked coins.

=== Svarna coins ===
Quarter svarna coins have been excavated from gandhara. Besides svarna being a term for gold coins (called Svarna Rupa), it was also a weight standard which replaced Purana or Dharana in ancient India. According to Arthashastra one svarna or karsha was equal to 80 rattis (based on 1 masha = 5 ratti standard)

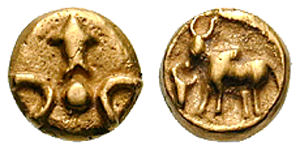
Taxila Quarter Svarna coin 185–170 BC weight 2.34 gm

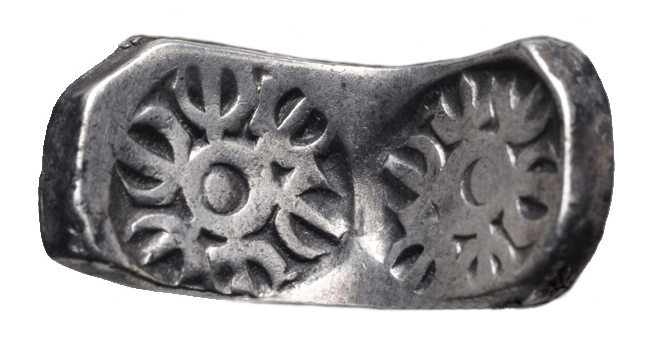
"Bent bar" Shatamana coin according to some experts were minted under Achaemenid administration, Gandhara, c. 350 BCE.

== Classical period (300 BCE – 1100 CE) ==
=== Mauryan Empire ===
The Mauryan Empire coins were punch marked with the royal standard to ascertain their authenticity. The Arthashastra, written by Kautilya, mentions minting of coins but also indicates that the violation of the Imperial Maurya standards by private enterprises may have been an offence. Kautilya also seemed to advocate a theory of bimetallism for coinage, which involved the use of two metals, copper and silver, under one government. The Mauryan rule also saw a steady emergence of inscribed copper coins in India as evidenced by Tripuri coins in Ashokan brahmi script and various pre Satavahana coins dated 3rd-2nd century BC in Deccan.

Maurya Empire coinage
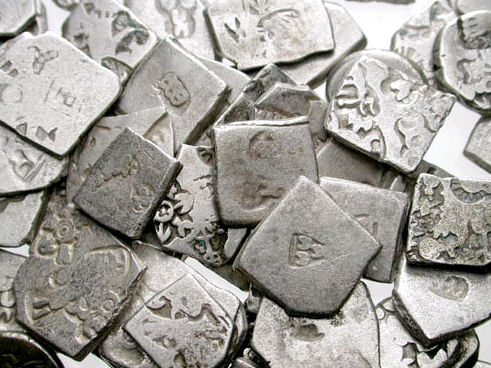
Hoard of mostly Mauryan coins.

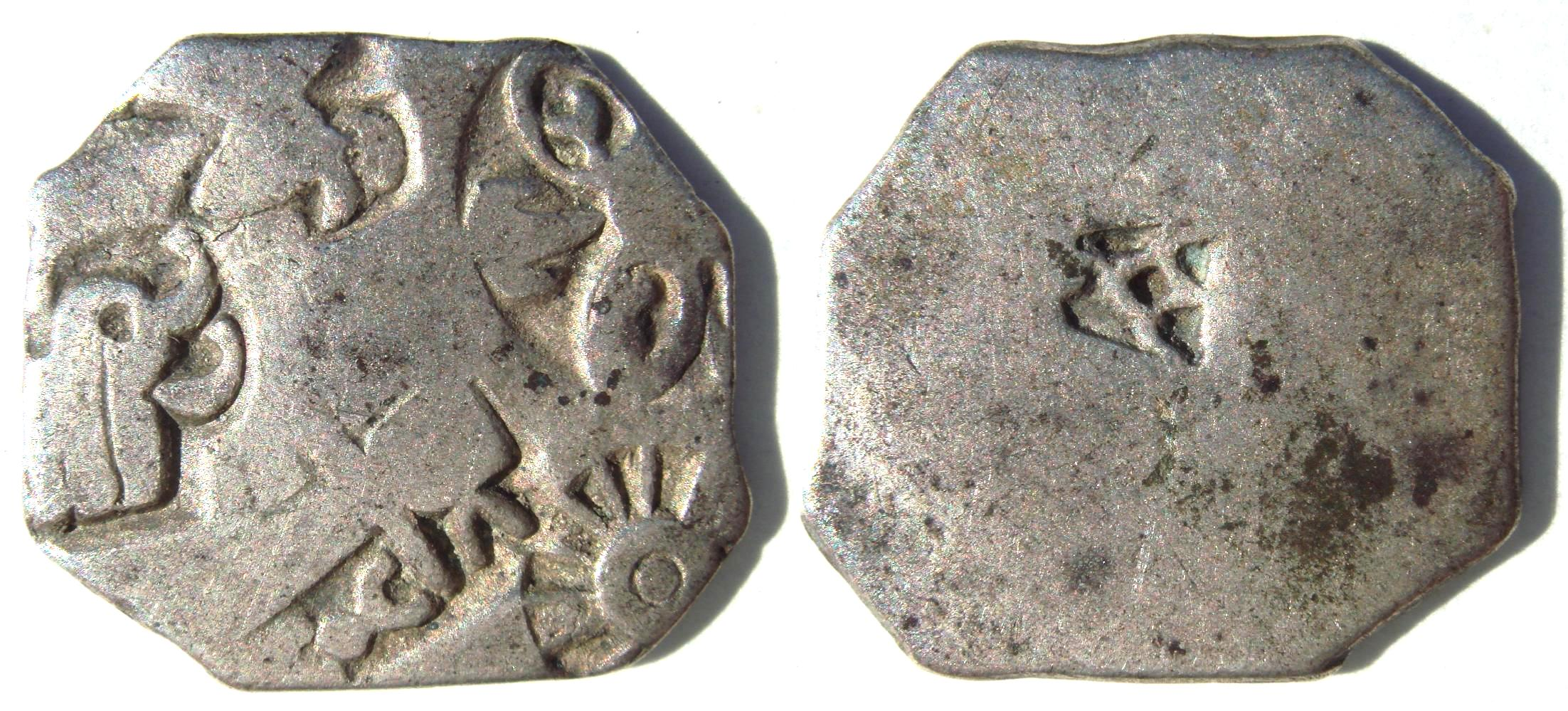
Silver punch mark coin of the Maurya empire, with symbols of wheel and elephant. 3rd century BCE.

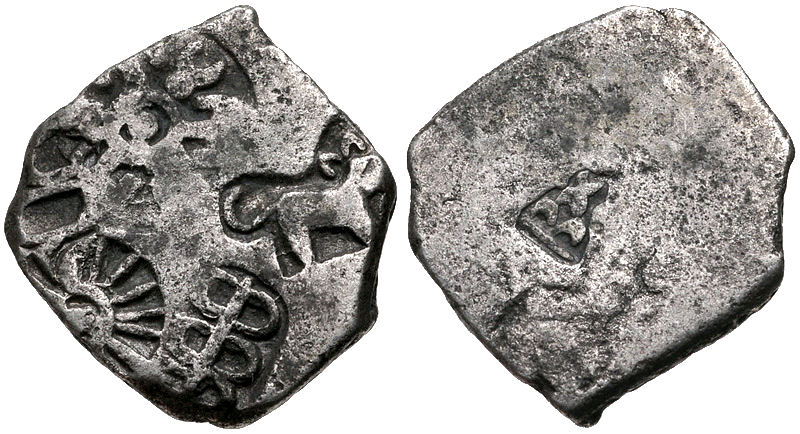
Mauryan coin with arched hill symbol on reverse.

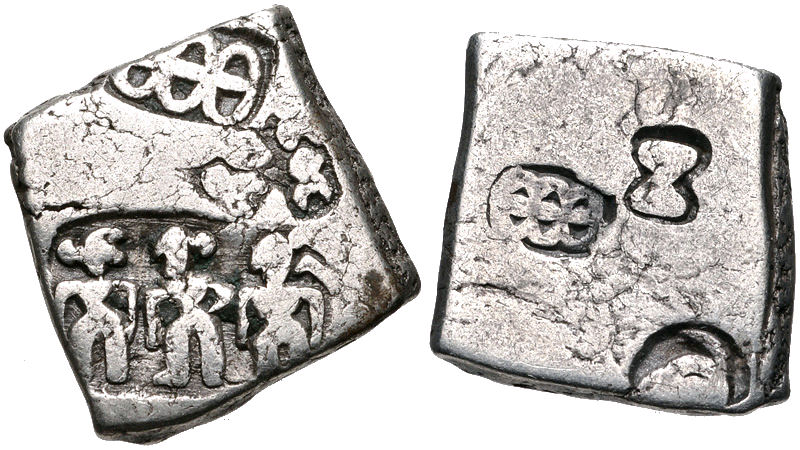
Mauryan Empire coin. Circa late 4th-2nd century BCE.

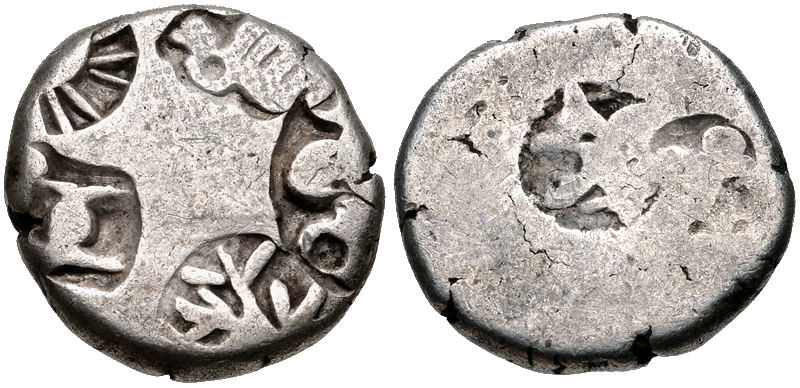
Mauryan Empire, Emperor Salisuka or later. Circa 207-194 BCE.

=== The Indo-Greeks ===
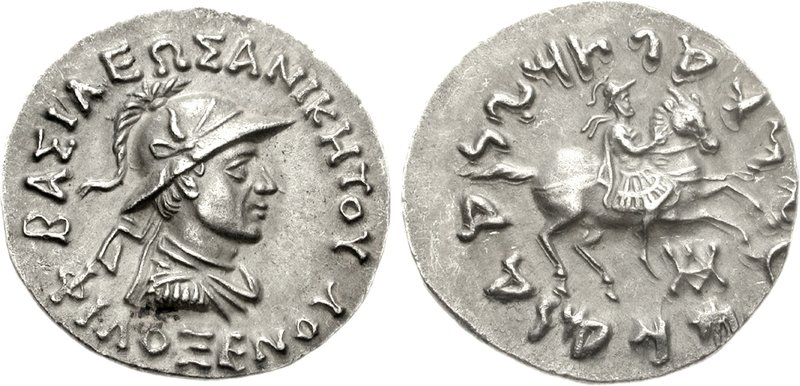
Silver tetradrachm of Indo-Greek king Philoxenus. Obv: Helmetted, diademed and draped bust of Philoxenus. Greek legend ΒΑΣΙΛΕΩΣ ΑΝΙΚΗΤΟΥ ΦΙΛΟΞΕΝΟΥ "Of the Invincible King Philoxenus" Rev: King on prancing horse in military dress. Kharoshti legend MAHARAJASA APADIHATASA PHILASINASA "Undefeatable King Philoxenus".

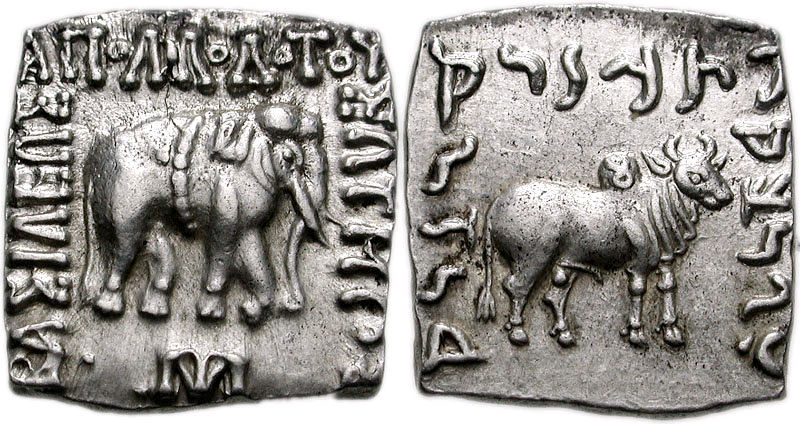
Coin of Apollodotus I, with a nandipada taurine symbol on the hump of the zebu bull. Obv: Elephant and Greek legend ΒΑΣΙΛΕΩΣ ΑΠΟΛΛΟΔΟΤΟΥ ΣΩΤΗΡΟΣ, "of Saviour King Apollodotus".

The Indo-Greek kings introduced Greek types, and among them the portrait head, into the Indian coinage, and their example was followed for eight centuries. Every coin has some mark of authority in it, this is what known as "types". It appears on every Greek and Roman coin. Demetrios was the first Bactrian king to strike square copper coins of the Indian type, with a legend in Greek on the obverse, and in Kharoshthi on the reverse. Copper coins, square for the most part, are very numerous. The devices are almost entirely Greek, and must have been engraved by Greeks, or Indians trained in the Greek traditions. The rare gold staters and the splendid tetradrachms of Bactria disappear. The silver coins of the Indo-Greeks, as these later princes may conveniently be called, are the didrachm and the hemidrachm. With the exception of certain square hemidrachms of Apollodotos and Philoxenos, they are all round, are struck to the Persian (or Indian) standard, and all have inscriptions in both Greek and Kharoshthi characters.

Coinage of Indo-Greek Kingdom began to increasingly influence coins from other regions of India by the 1st century BCE. By this time a large number of tribes, dynasties and kingdoms began issuing their coins; Prākrit legends began to appear. The extensive coinage of the Kushan Empire (1st–3rd centuries CE) continued to influence the coinage of the Guptas (320 to 550 CE) and the later rulers of Kashmir.

During the early rise of Roman trade with India, up to 120 ships were setting sail every year from Myos Hormos to India. Gold coins, used for this trade, was apparently being recycled by the Kushan empire for their own coinage. In the 1st century CE, the Roman writer Pliny the Elder complained about the vast sums of money leaving the Roman empire for India:

India, China and the Arabian peninsula take one hundred million sesterces from our empire per annum at a conservative estimate: that is what our luxuries and women cost us. For what percentage of these imports is intended for sacrifices to the gods or the spirits of the dead? - Pliny, Historia Naturalis 12.41.84.

The trade was particularly focused around the regions of Gujarat, ruled by the Western Satraps, and the tip of the Indian peninsular in Southern India. Large hoards of Roman coins have been found and especially in the busy maritime trading centers of South India. The South Indian kings reissued Roman-like coinage in their own name, either producing their own copies or defacing real ones in order to signify their sovereignty.

=== The Sakas (200 BCE – 400 CE) ===
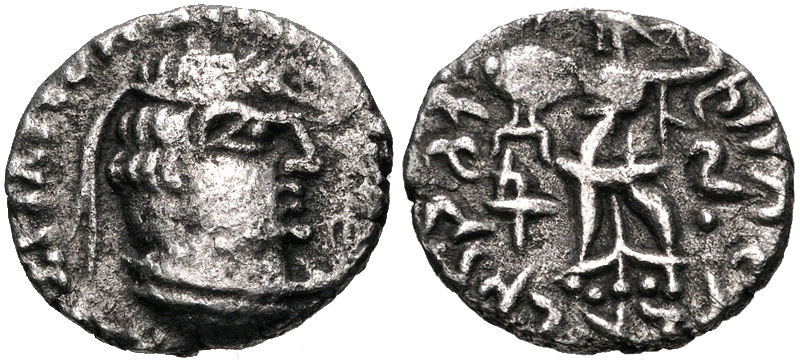
Coin of Indo-Scythian Northern Satrap Rajuvula. Obv. Bust of king and Greek legend. Rev. Athena Alkidemos and Kharoshthi legend chatrapasa apratihatachakrasa rajuvulasa "the Satrap Rajuvula whose discus [cakra] is irresistible".The coins are derived from the Indo-Greek types of Strato II.

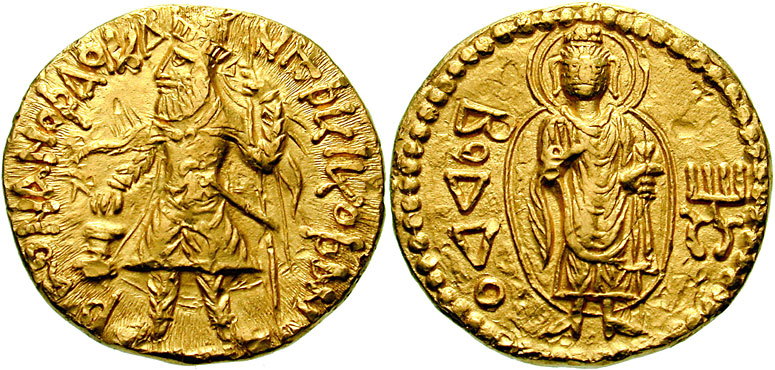
Coin of Kanishka in Greek script, with illustration of the Buddha on the reverse

During the Indo-Scythians period whose era begins from 200 BCE to 400 CE, a new kind of the coins of two dynasties were very popular in circulation in various parts of the then India and parts of central and northern South Asia (Sogdiana, Bactria, Arachosia, Gandhara, Sindh, Kashmir, Punjab, Haryana, Rajasthan, Uttar Pradesh and Bihar). These dynasties were Saka and The Pahlavas. After the conquest of Bactria by the Sakas in 135 BCE there must have been considerable intercourse sometimes of a friendly, sometimes of a hostile character, between them and the Parthians, who occupied the neighboring territory.

Maues, whose coins are found only in the Punjab, was the first king of what may be called the Azes group of princes. His silver is not plentiful; the finest type is that with a "biga" (two-horsed chariot) on the obverse, and this type belongs to a square Hemi drachm, the only square aka silver coin known. His most common copper coins, with an elephant's head on the obverse and a "Caduceus" (staff of the god Hermes) on the reverse are imitated from a round copper coin of Demetrius. On another copper square coin of Maues the king is represented on horseback. This striking device is characteristic both of the Saka and Pahlava coinage; it first appears in a slightly different form on coins of the Indo-Greek Hippostratos; the Gupta kings adopted it for their "horseman" type, and it reappears in Medieval India on the coins of numerous Hindu kingdoms until the 14th century CE.

=== Kanishka and Huvishka (100–200 CE) ===
Kanishka's copper coinage which came into the scene during 100–200 CE was of two types: one had the usual "standing king" obverse, and on the rarer second type the king is sitting on a throne. At about the same time there was Huvishka's copper coinage which was more varied; on the reverse, as on Kanishka's copper, there was always one of the numerous deities; on the obverse the king was portrayed (1) riding on an elephant, or (2) reclining on a couch, or (3) seated cross-legged, or (4) seated with arms raised.

== Middle Kingdoms (230 BCE – 1206 CE) ==
=== Gupta Empire (320 – 480 CE) ===
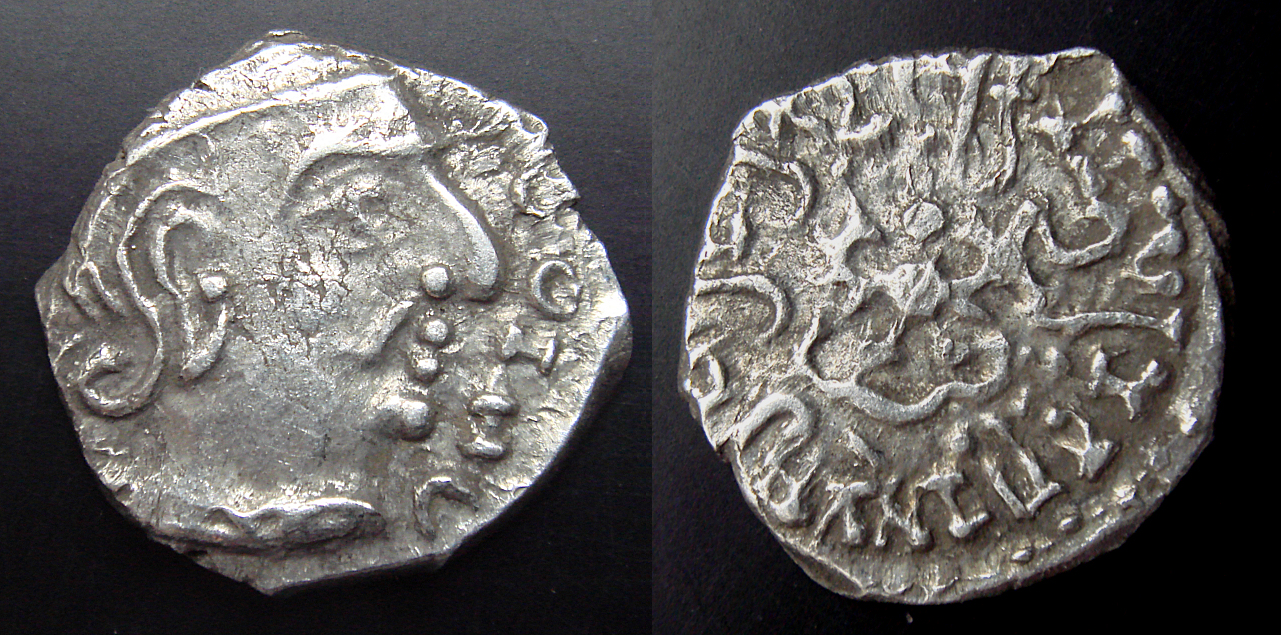
Silver coin of Chandragupta II of Gupta Empire, in the style of the Western Satrap, with pseudo-Greek script on the obverse, 400 CE

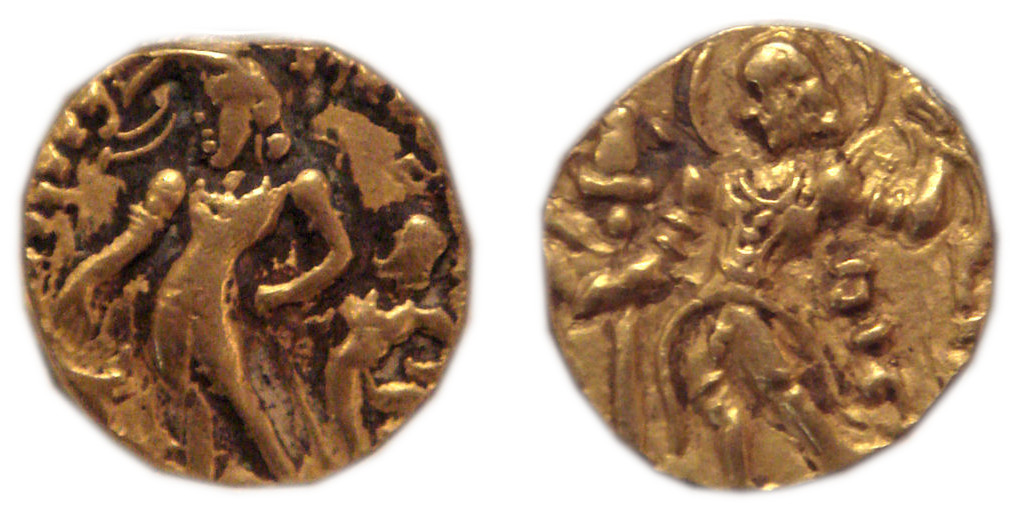
Gold coins of Chandragupta II of Gupta Empire, 400 CE

The Gupta Empire produced large numbers of gold coins depicting the Gupta kings performing various rituals, as well as silver coins clearly influenced by those of the earlier Western Satraps by Chandragupta II. The standard gold coin was the 8g Dīnāra (Sanskrit: दीनार), modelled after the Roman denarius. Skandagupta later introduced the 9.2g Suvarṇa (Sanskrit: सुवर्ण). The silver Rūpaka (Sanskrit: रूपक) was worth 1/16 of a Dinara, and weighed approximately 20 ratis (2.2678g).

The gold coinage of Guptas, with its many types and infinite varieties and its inscriptions in Sanskrit, are examples of pure Indian art. Their era starts from around 320 with Chandragupta I's accession to the throne. Son of Chandragupta I-Samudragupta, the real founder of the Gupta Empire had coinage made of gold only. There were seven different varieties of coins that appeared during his reign. Out of them the archer type is the most common and characteristic type of the Gupta dynasty coins, which were struck by at least eight succeeding kings and was a standard type in the kingdom.

The silver coinage of Guptas starts with the overthrow of the Western Satraps by Chandragupta II. Kumaragupta and Skandagupta continued with the old type of coins (the Garuda and the Peacock types) and also introduced some other new types. The copper coinage was mostly confined to the era of Chandragupta II and was more original in design. Eight out of the nine types known to have been struck by him have a figure of Garuda and the name of the King on it. The gradual deterioration in design and execution of the gold coins and the disappearance of silver money, bear ample evidence to their curtailed territory. The percentage of gold in Indian coins under the reign of Gupta rulers showed a steady financial decline over the centuries as it decreases from 90% pure gold under Chandragupta I (319–335) to a mere 75–80% under Skandagupta (467).

=== Indo-Sasanian coinage (530–1202 CE) ===
There is a whole category of Indian coins, in the "Indo-Sassanian style", also sometimes called Gadhaiya paisa, that were derived from the Sasanian coinage in a rather geometric fashion, among the Gurjaras, Gurjar-Pratiharas, Chaulukya-Paramara and Palas from c. 530 CE to 1202 CE. Typically, the bust of the king on the obverse is highly simplified and geometric, and the design of the fire altar, with or without the two attendants, appears as a geometrical motif on the reverse of this type of coinage.

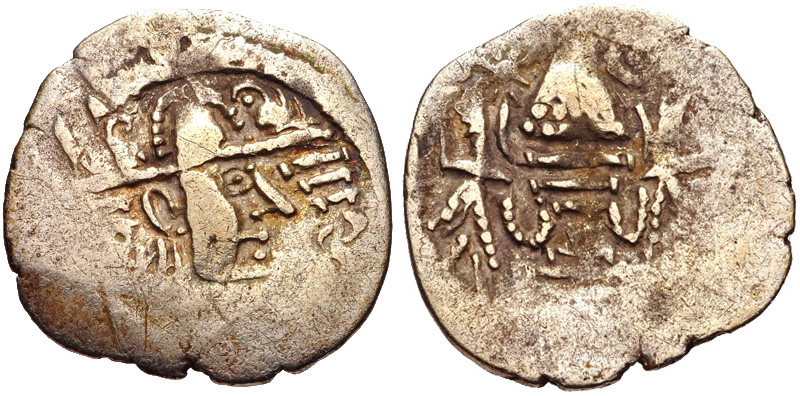
Coin of the Gurjara Confederacy, on the model of the Sasanian coinage of Sindh. Sindh. c. 570–712 CE

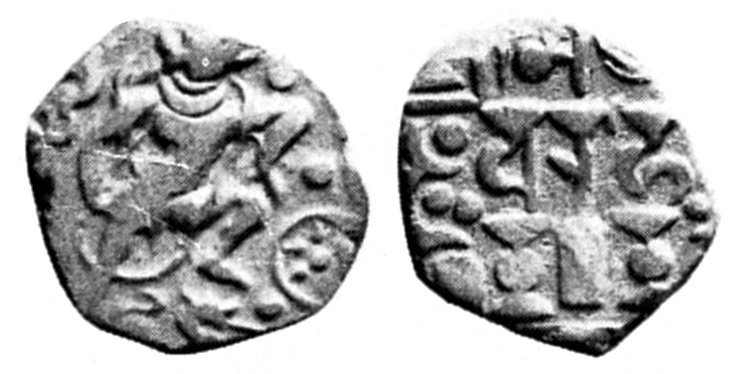
Gurjara-Pratihara coinage of Bhoja or Mihara, King of Kanauj, 850–900 CE. Obv: Boar, incarnation of Vishnu, and solar symbol. Rev: "Traces of Sasanian type". Legend: Srímad Ādi Varāha "The fortunate primaeval boar".

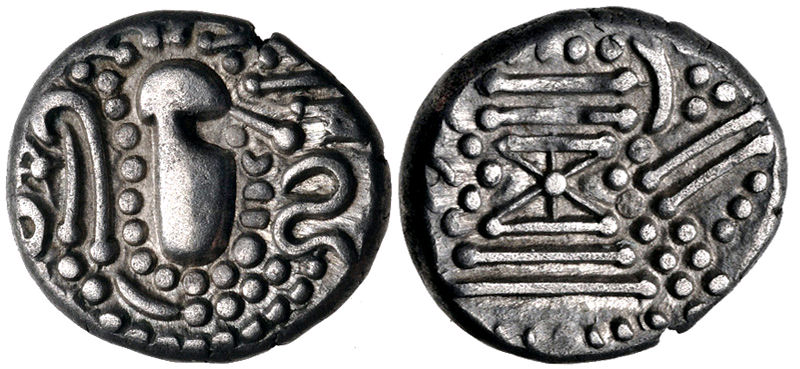
A Chaulukya-Paramara coin, circa 950–1050 CE. Stylized rendition of Chavda dynasty coins: Indo-Sassanian style bust right; pellets and ornaments around / Stylised fire altar; pellets around.

=== Chola Empire (850–1279 CE) ===
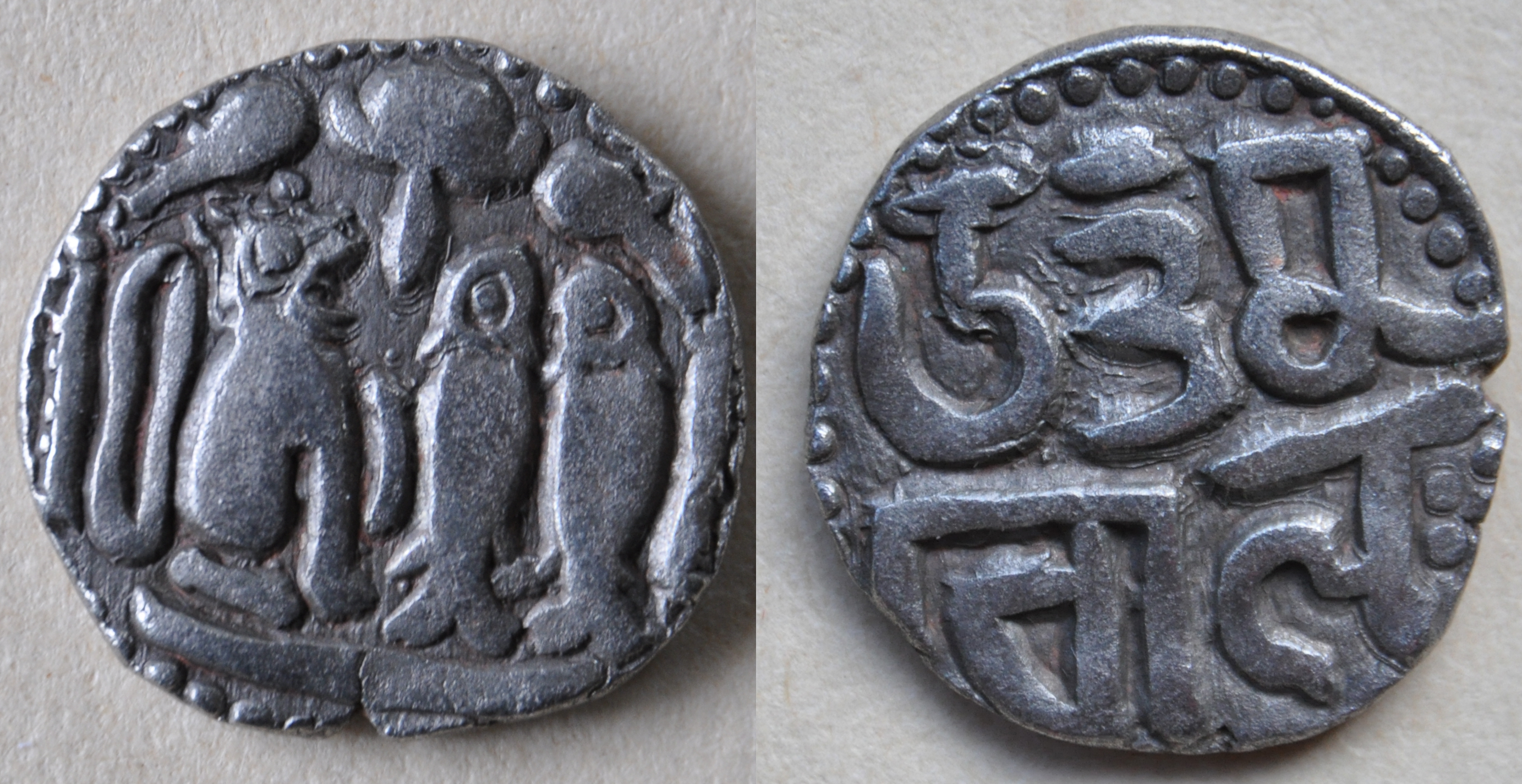
An early silver coin of Uttama Chola showing the tiger emblem of the Chola and in Nagari script

The coins of the Chola Empire bear similarities with other South Indian dynastic issue coins. Chola coins invariable display a tiger crest. The appearance of the fish and bow on Chola issue coins that were emblems associated with the Pandyas and Cheras respectively suggests successful political conquest of these powers as well as co-option of existing coin issuing practices.

=== Rajput Kingdoms (1200–1400 CE) ===
The coins of various Rajput princess's ruling in Hindustan and Central India were usually of gold, copper or billon, very rarely silver. These coins had the familiar goddess of wealth, Lakshmi on the obverse. In these coins, the Goddess was shown with four arms than the usual two arms of the Gupta coins; the reverse carried the Nagari legend. The seated bull and horseman were almost invariable devices on the Rajput jital coin of copper or billon (silver/copper alloy).

=== Eastern Ganga Empire (1038–1434 CE) ===
The Eastern Ganga coinage consisted of gold fanams. The obverse typically depicts a couchant bull along with other symbols. The reverse features a symbol which represents the letter sa (for samvat, which means year) flanked by elephant goads or an elephant goad with a battle axe, along with a number below, which depicts the regnal year(anka year) of the reigning monarch. Some coins also carry the legend śrī rāma on the reverse above the letter sa.

An interesting aspect of the Eastern Ganga coin dates is that these coins may be the earliest Hindu coins using decimal numbers for dating. Earlier dated coins, such as those of the Western Satraps, the Guptas etc., used the old Brahmic numbering system with separate symbols representing each of the single digits, separate symbols representing two-digit multiples of ten, such as 20, 30, 40, and so on, and further separate symbols representing three-digit numbers such as 100, 200, etc. Thus a number like 123 was written as 100-20-3. But the Eastern Ganga coins were written using the symbols for the single digits, with the position of the number indicating the value such as tens or hundreds, thus effectively using the Zero-place holder system.

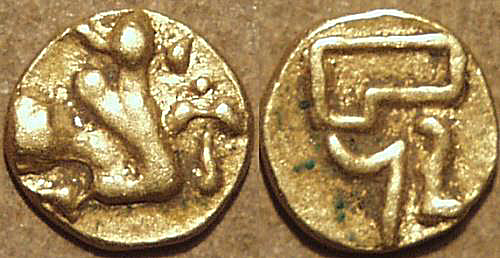
Eastern Ganga fanam of Anantavarman Chodaganga (Anka year 63–1128 CE)

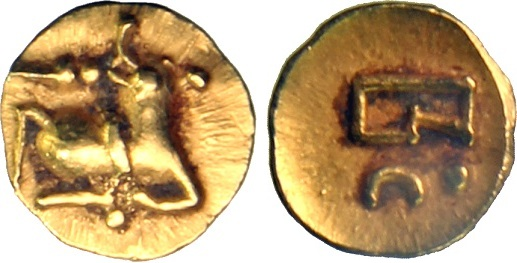
A Fanam (Coin) of Eastern Ganga Dynasty

=== Ghaznavids ===
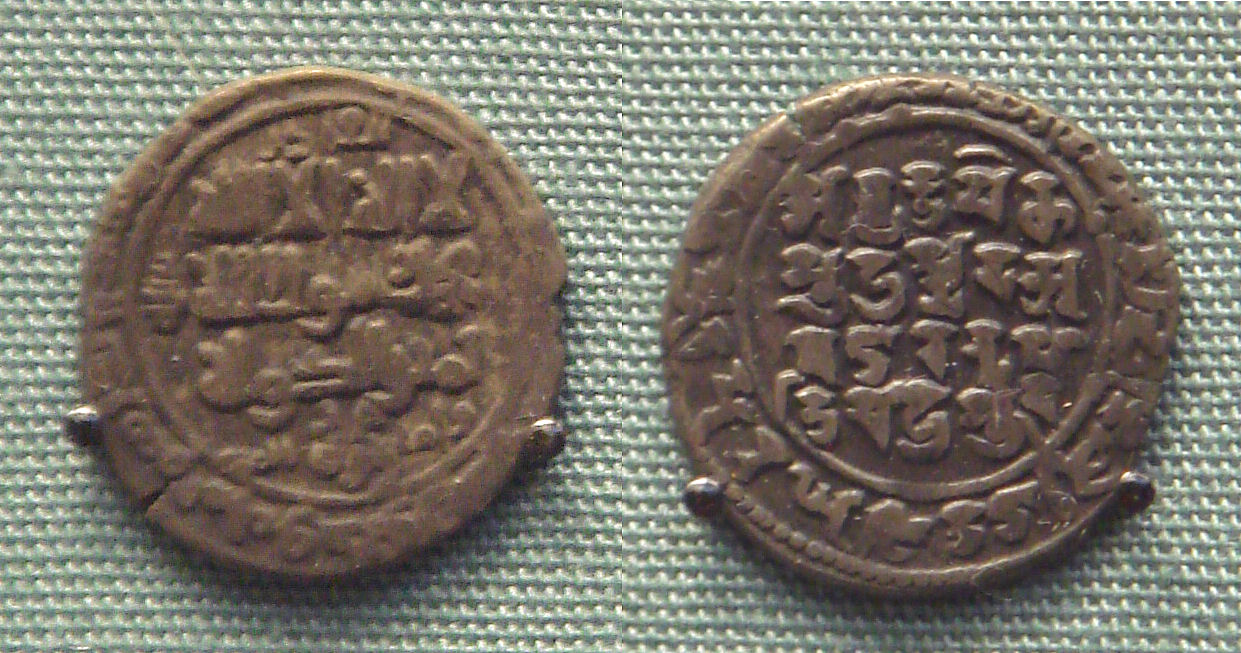
Silver jitals of Mahmud of Ghazni with bilingual Arabic and Sanskrit minted in Lahore 1028. Legend – verse: la ilaha illa'llah muhammad rasulullah sal allahu alayhi wa sallam; reverse: avyaktam eka muhammada avatāra nrpati mahamuda.

Some bilingual silver jitals were issued by the Ghaznavids from Lahore included both Arabic and Sanskrit inscriptions, with Sanskrit in Sharada script.

== Late Medieval and Early Modern period (c. 1300–1858 CE) ==
=== Delhi Sultanate (c. 1206–1526 CE) ===
==== Razia Sultana ====
Razia Sultana was one of the few queens regnant in the history of India, and thus one of the few women to issue coins.

==== Alauddin Khalji ====
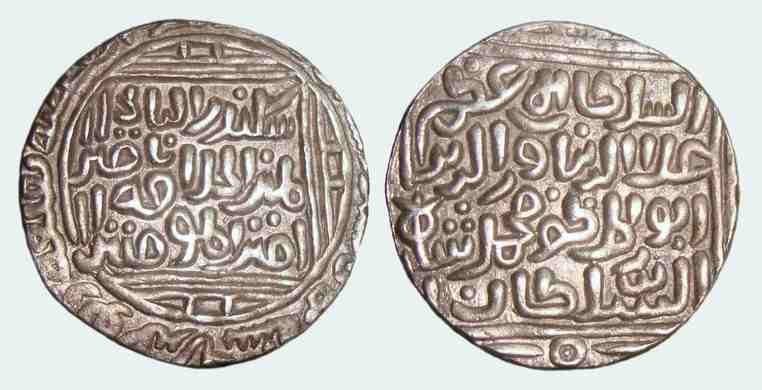
Silver Tanka of Alauddin Khalji.

Alauddin Khalji minted coins with the legend struck as Sikander Sani. Sikander is Old Persian for 'victor', a title popularized by Alexander. While sani is Arabic for to 'second'. The coin legend (Sikander-e -Sani) translates to 'Second Alexander' in recognition of his military success. His coins omitted the mention of the Khalifa, replacing it with the self-laudatory title Sikander-us-sani Yamin-ul-Khilafat.

==== Token currency of Muhammad bin Tughluq ====
The Sultan of Delhi, Muhammad bin Tughluq, issued token currency; that is coins of brass and copper were minted whose value was equal to that of gold and silver coins. Historian Ziauddin Barani felt that this step was taken by Tughluq as he wanted to annex all the inhabited areas of the world for which a treasury was required to pay the army. Barani had also written that the sultan's treasury had been exhausted by his action of giving rewards and gifts in gold. This experiment failed, because, as said by Barani, "the house of every Hindu became a mint". During his time, most of the Hindu citizens were goldsmiths and hence they knew how to make coins. In the rural areas, officials like the muqaddams paid the revenue in brass and copper coins and also used the same coins to purchase arms and horses. As a result, the value of coins decreased and, as said by Satish Chandra, the coins became "as worthless as stones".

=== Ahom Kingdom (1228–1826 CE) ===
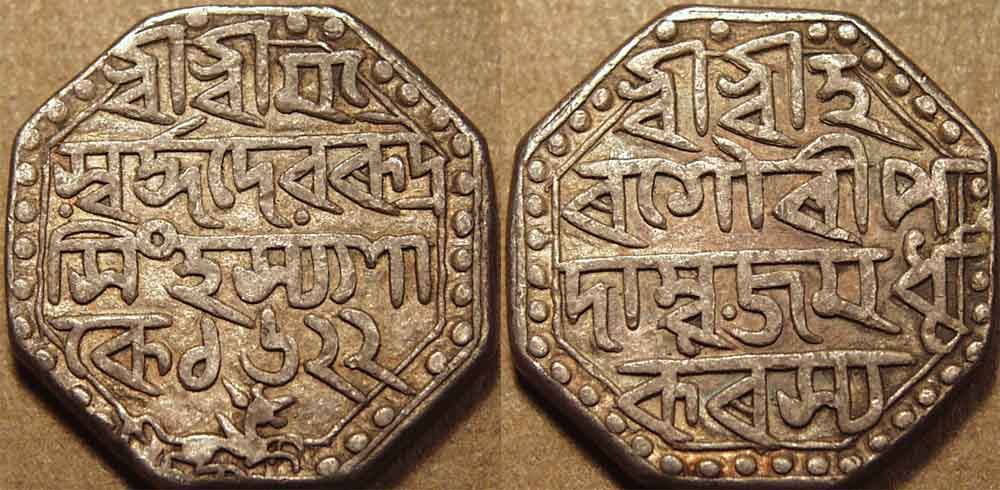
Rajmohuree (rupee) of Rudra Singha

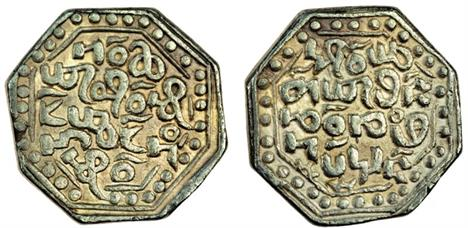
Coin of Udayaditya Singha in Ahom script

=== Vijayanagara Empire (c. 1336–1646 CE) ===
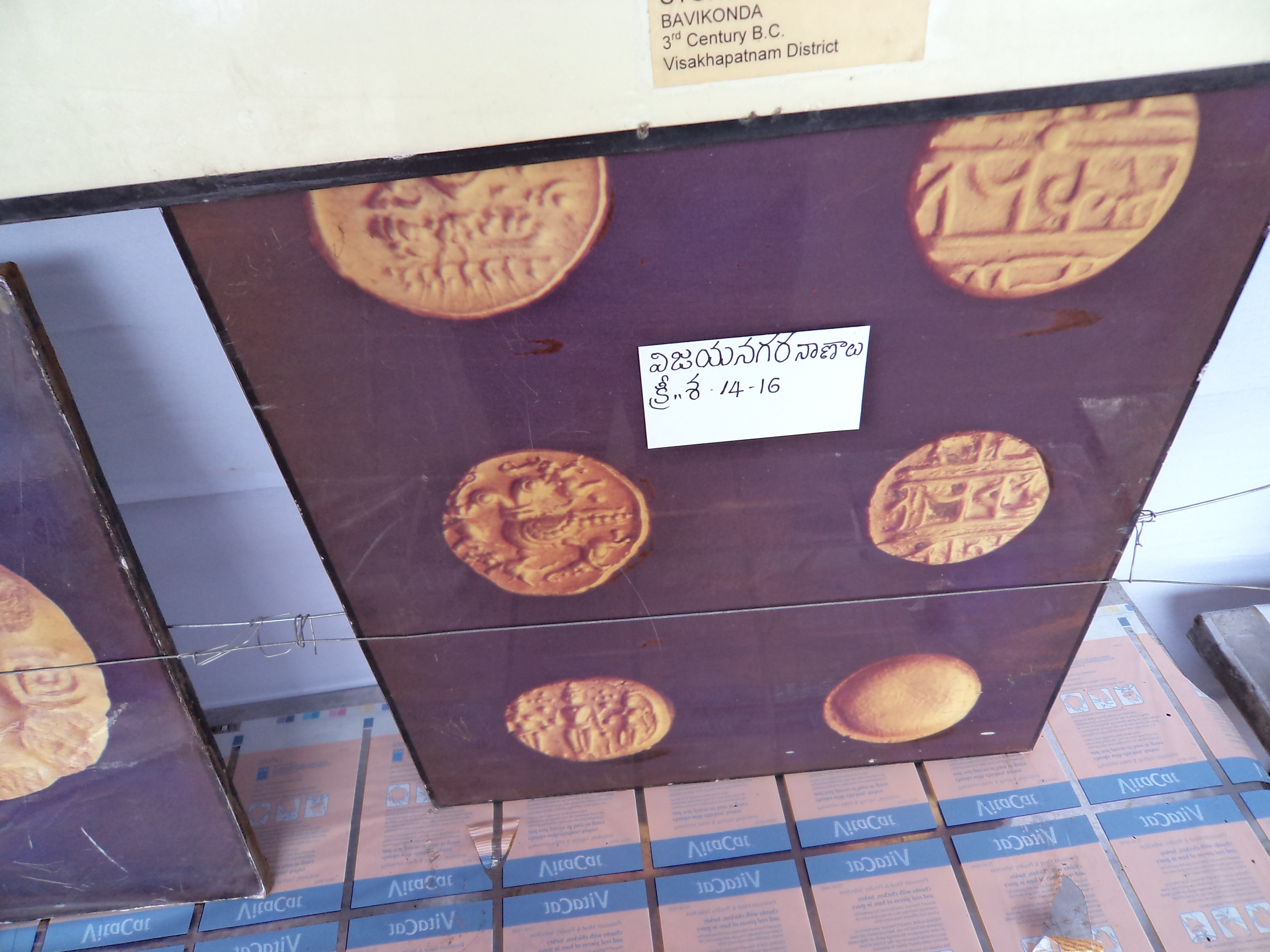
Coins of the Vijayanagara Empire on display

The standard coin issued by the Vijayanagara Empire was the gold Pagoda or Varaha of 3.4 g. The Varaha was also called the Hon, Gadyana or a Pon and came in the Ghattivaraha, Doddavaraha and Suddhavaraha coin. In the gold issue, the different coins came in Varaha, this is used as a reference for the other coins values. There were also other units of silver and copper based on their relationship with the Pagodagold. Several gold ramatankas (token coins), feature the scene of Rama's incoronation, were also issued in the Vijayanagara Empire.

=== Early Mughal Emperors (c. 1526–1540 CE) ===
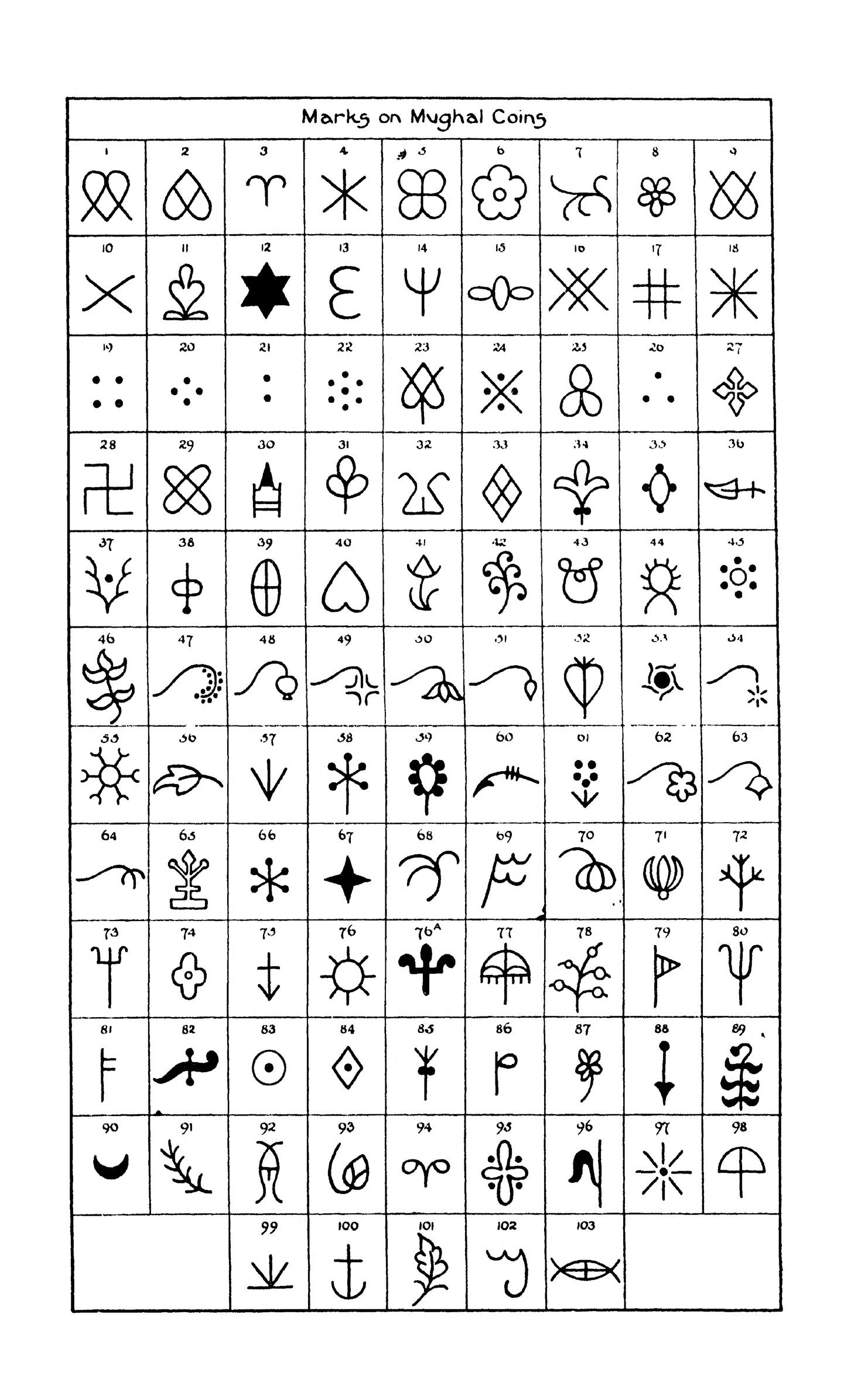
Marks on Mughal coins

The Mughal Emperor Babur issued standard Timurid currency coins known as the shahrukhi, named after Shahrukh Mirza, Timur's eldest son. The Shahrukhis were essentially thin broad-flanned coins imprinted with the Sunni kalima or credo on its obverse at the center with the names of the first four caliphs around it. The reverse had the king's name and titles along with the date in the Hijri era and the name of the minting town. Babur's successor Humayun continued the minting of Shahrukhi-styled coins.

=== Sur Empire (c. 1540–1556 CE) ===
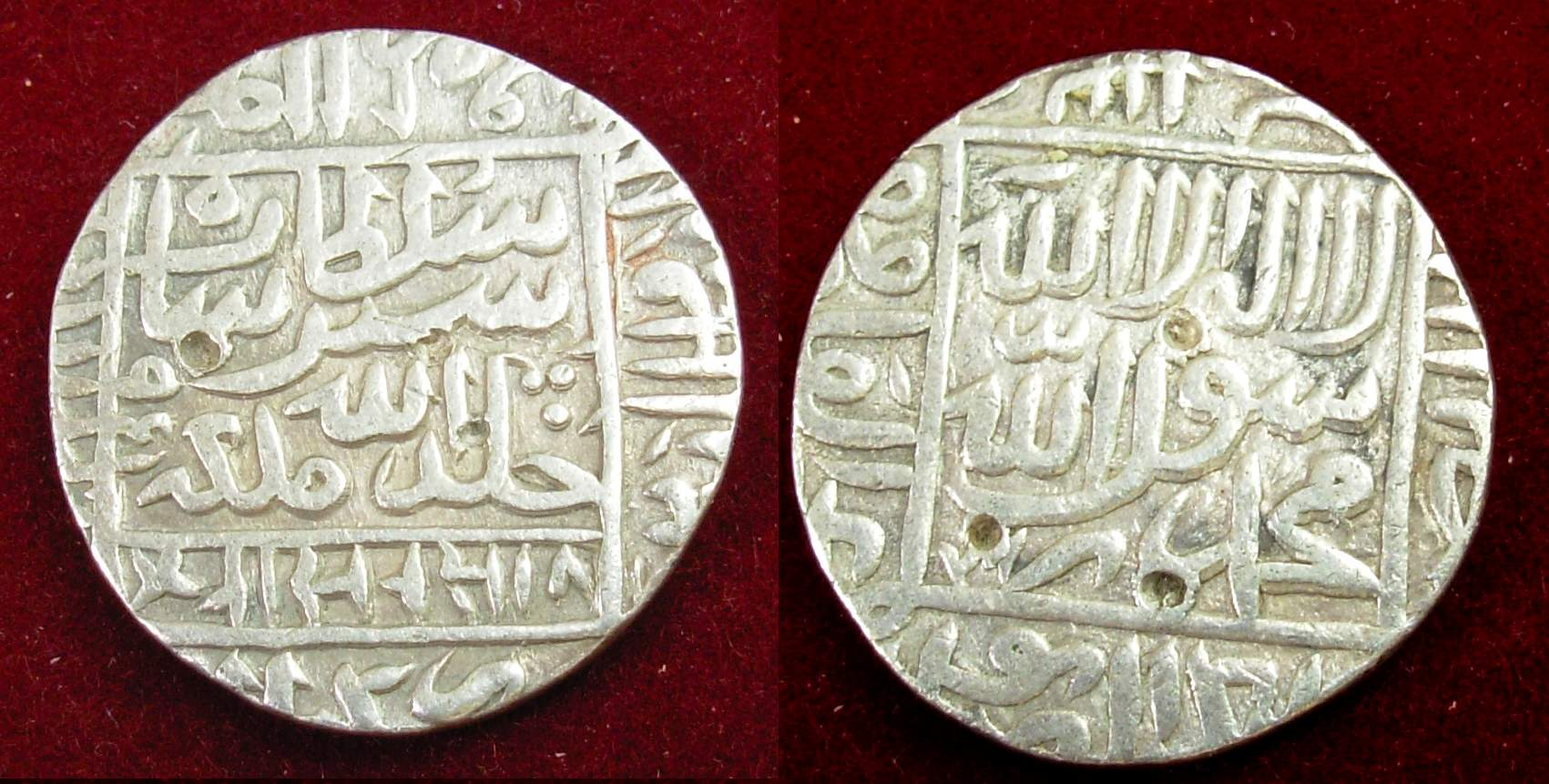
Silver Rupee introduced by Sher Shah Suri.

The system of tri-metalism which came to characterize Mughal coinage was introduced by Sher Shah Suri. While the term rūpya had previously been used as a generic term for any silver coin, during his rule the term rūpee came to be used as the name for a silver coin of a standard weight of 178 grains, which was the precursor of the modern rupee.

=== Later Mughal Emperors (c. 1555–1857 CE) ===
==== All Coins of Akbar ====
Political orders in Medieval India were based on a relationship and association of power by which the supreme ruler, especially a monarch was able to influence the actions of the subjects. In order for the relationship to work, it had to be expressed and communicated in the best possible way.

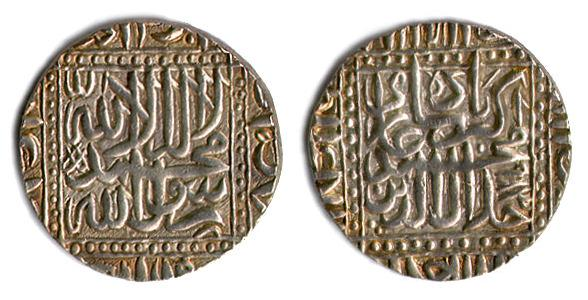
Silver Rupee of Akbar with inscriptions of the Islamic declaration of faith, the inscription reads: "There is no god but Allah, and Muhammad is the messenger of Allah."

In other words, power was by nature declarative from the point of view of its intelligibility and comprehensibility to the audience and required modes of communication to take effect by means of which sovereign power was articulated in the 16th century India. An examination was done of a series of coins officially issued and circulated by the Mughal emperor Akbar (r. 1556–1605) to illustrate and project a particular view of time, religion, and political supremacy being fundamental and co-existing in nature. Coins constitute part of the evidence that project the transmission of religious and political ideas in the last quarter of the 16th century. The word 'Alf' refers to the millennium.

The following are the extraordinary decisions, though bizarre, were taken by King Akbar.

- The date in coins were written in words and not in figures.
- If the intention was to refer to the year 1000 (yak hazar) of the Islamic calendar (hijri era) as is traditionally believed, the expression adopted for it (Alf) was unorthodox and eccentric.
- Akbar, ultimately and more importantly, commanded Alf to be imprinted on the coins in 990 hijri (1582 CE ), or ten years before the date (1000 hijri) was due.

The order was a major departure and extremely unconventional and eccentric from the norm of striking coins in medieval India. Till the advent of Alf, all gold and silver coins had been stuck with figure of the current hijri year. Akbar's courtier and critic, Abdul Badani, presents and explains in brevity the motive for these unconventional decisions while describing the events that took place in 990 AH (1582 CE):

And having thus convinced himself that the thousand years from the prophethood of the apostle (B'isat I Paighambar) the duration for which Islam [lit. religion] would last was now over, and nothing prevented him from articulating the desires he so secretly held in his heart, and the space became empty of the theologians (ulema) and mystics (mashaikh) who had carried awe and dignity and no need was felt for them: he [Akbar] felt himself at liberty to refute the principles of Islam and to institute new regulations, obsolete and corrupt but considered precious by his pernicious beliefs. The first order, which was given to write the date Alf on coins (Dar Sikka tank half Navisand) and to write the Tarikh-i Alfi [history of the millennium] from the demise (Rihlat) of the prophet (Badauni II: 301).

The evidence, both textual and numismatic, actually makes it clear that Akbar's decisions to mint the Alf coins and commission the Tarikh-i-Alfi were based on a new communication and interpretation of the terminal dates of the Islamic millennium. What the evidence doesn't explain is the source of the idea as well as the reason for persisting with the same date on the imperial coinage even after the critical year had passed.

==== Jahangir ====
Jahangir issued coins with the images of various zodiac signs to illustrate the date as well as portraits of himself with a cup of wine in his hand. This was resented by the clergy, as representation of living beings was forbidden in Islam. These coins were melted during the reign of Shah Jahan, and only a few specimens survive today.

=== Maratha Empire ===
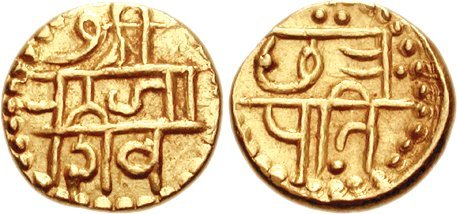
Maratha Empire, Chhatrapati Shivaji, Gold hon, c. 1674–80 CE

The Marathas became powerful under leadership of Chatrapati Maharaj Shivaji who ascended to throne in 1674. The Marathas became very powerful and controlled vast territory of the Indian subcontinent by the early eighteenth century. The Marathas issued Shivrai coins. The obverse of the coin had the inscription ' Sri Raja Shiv' in devanagari. The reverse of the coin had 'Chatrapati' in devanagari. The coins were issued in copper for the masses. Very few gold coins known as Shivrai hon were also issued.

== British Colonial period (c. 1858–1947 CE) ==
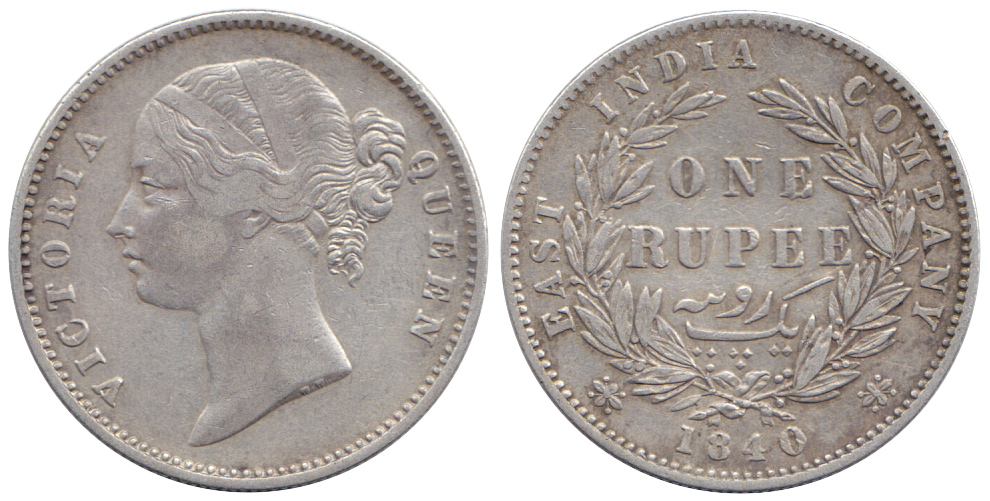
1840 East India Company Rupee coin depicting Queen Victoria. It was minted in Bombay, Calcutta and Madras.

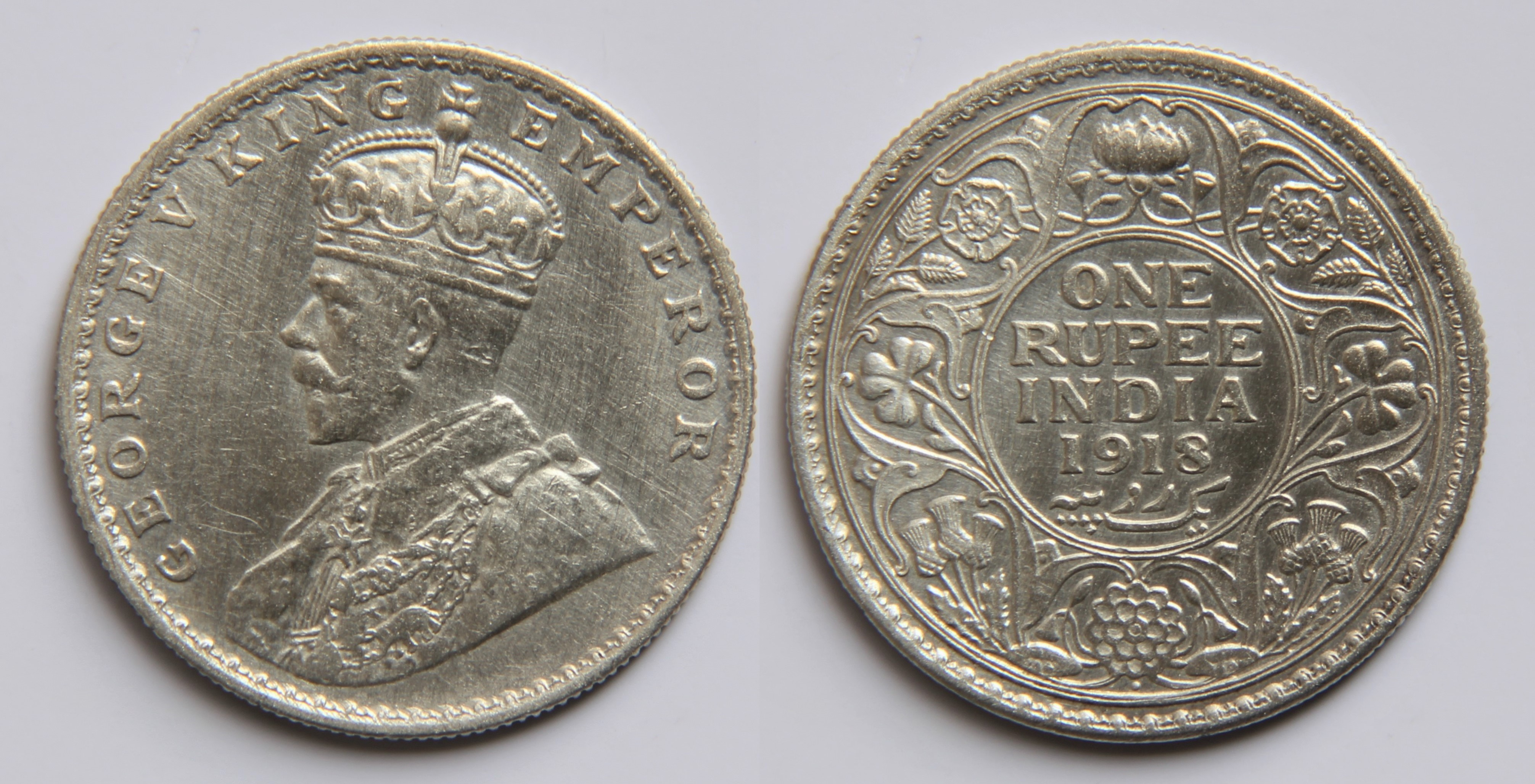
1 Indian rupee (1918) featuring King George V.

Uniform coinage was introduced in India by the British in 1835, with coins in the name of the East India Company, bearing the image of William IIII. In 1840, these were replaced by coins with an image of Queen Victoria, but the design otherwise remained the same. The next set of coins was minted in 1862 and had significant changes - East India Company was replaced by 'India'. The image of Queen Victoria was also changed, shown in a regal robe with a crown. In 1877, Victoria was declared the Empress of India - and her title on Indian coins changed as a result. This last design continued till 1938, with only the image of the ruler changing. Over this entire period, the weight of the Indian rupee and its purity remained constant at 11.66 grams and 91.7% respectively.

=== Princely States ===
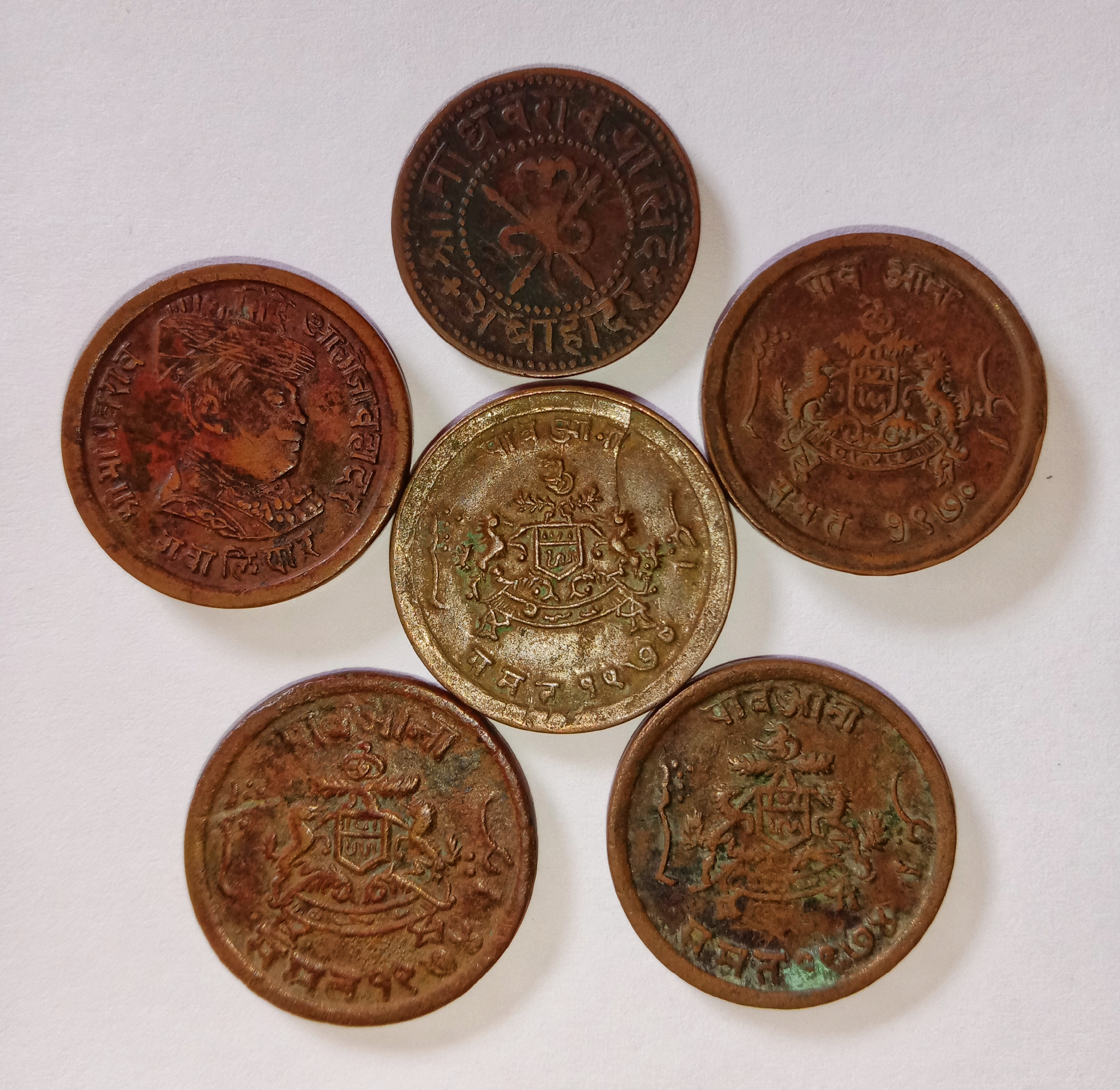
Copper coins from the Gwalior State, issued on the name of Madho Rao Scindia.

==== Hyderabad State ====
The Hyderabadi Rupee coins featured the Charminar.

==== Travancore State ====
Issues of the Travancore Rupee often had the names or insignia of the reigning monarch in English. The reverse features inscriptions in the native language of Malayalam. The year, when printed on the coins was based on the Malayalam calendar.

==== Baroda state ====
Gaekwads were officers in the Peshwa army. They proved their skills in the battlefield and rose to become generals. After the Marathas empire weakened Baroda became a semi independent state. The first coins issued by the Gaekwads were issued by Manaji Rao (r. 1789–93) and they followed the Maratha pattern of naming the Mughal emperor Shah Alam II, distinguishing themselves only by the placement of an extra mark or letter to indicate the issuer. After 1857, the designs were changed and coins were issued in the name of the Gaekwads. The legends on these coins were still in Persian and the coins themselves were still hand- struck. Later Nagari legends and different designs were introduced and milled coins featuring the portrait of the Gaekwad were issued.

== Post-Independence (c. 1947 CE – present) ==
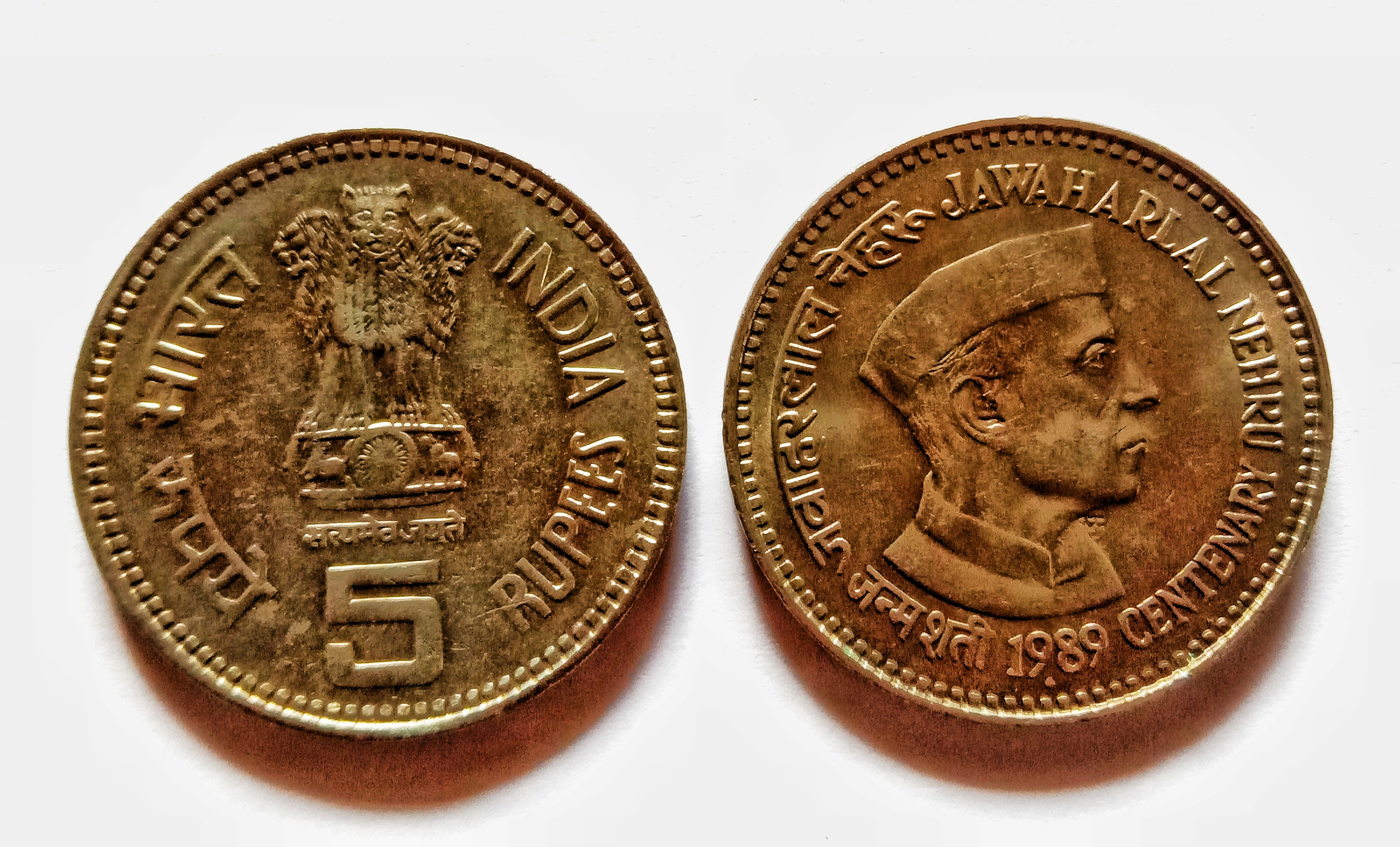
5 Rupees coin commemorating the birth centenary of Jawaharlal Nehru in 1989.

=== Dominion of India (c. 1947–1950) ===
The newly independent Dominion of India retained the previous imperial currency with images of British monarchs.

=== Pre-Decimalization (c. 1950–1957) ===
On 26 January 1950, India became a sovereign republic. This series was introduced on 15 August 1950 and represented the first coinage of Republic India. The British monarch's portrait was replaced by the Lion Capital of Ashoka.

== Gallery ==
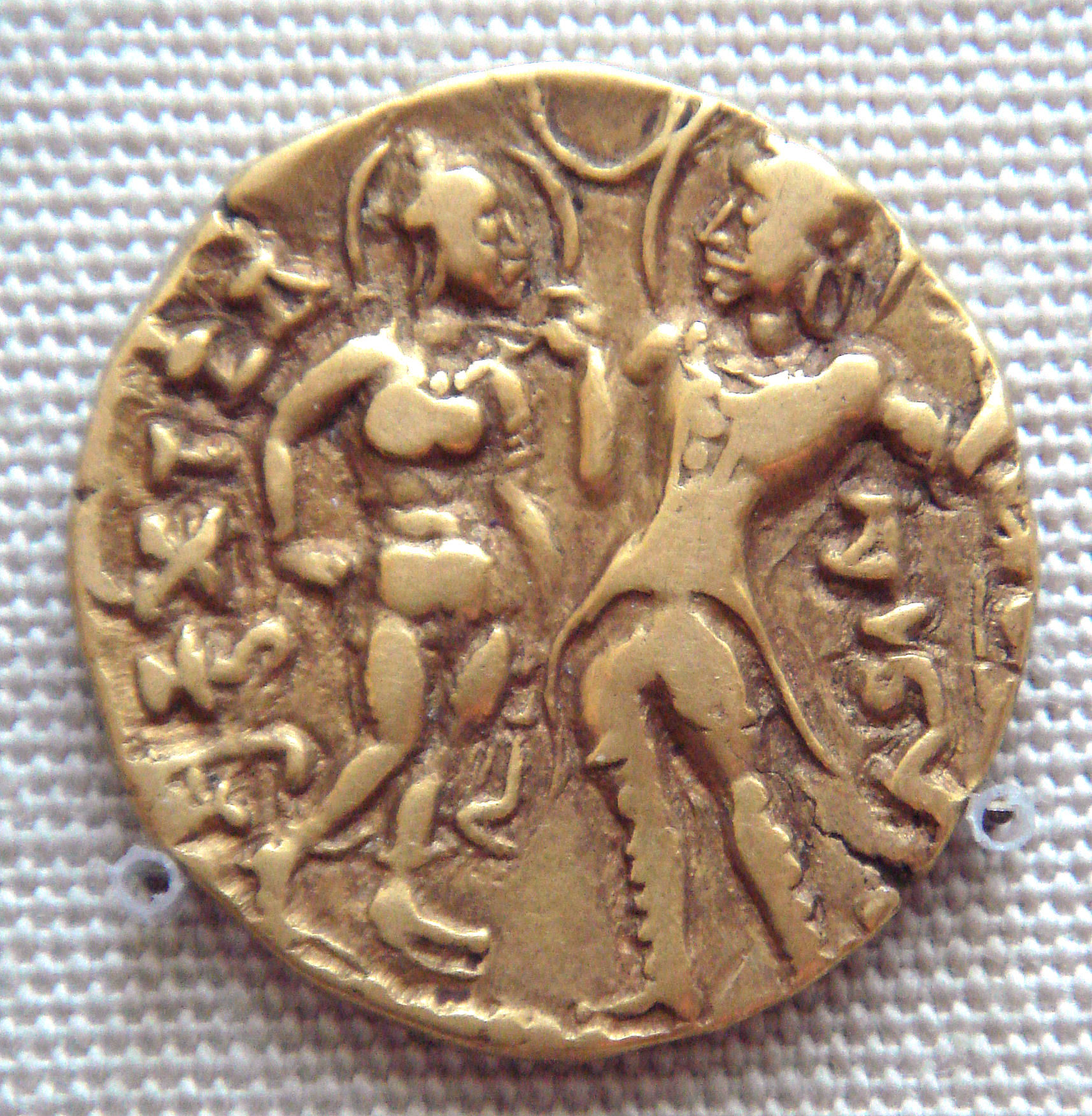
Queen Kumar and King Chandragupta I on a coin of their son Samudragupta 380 CE.

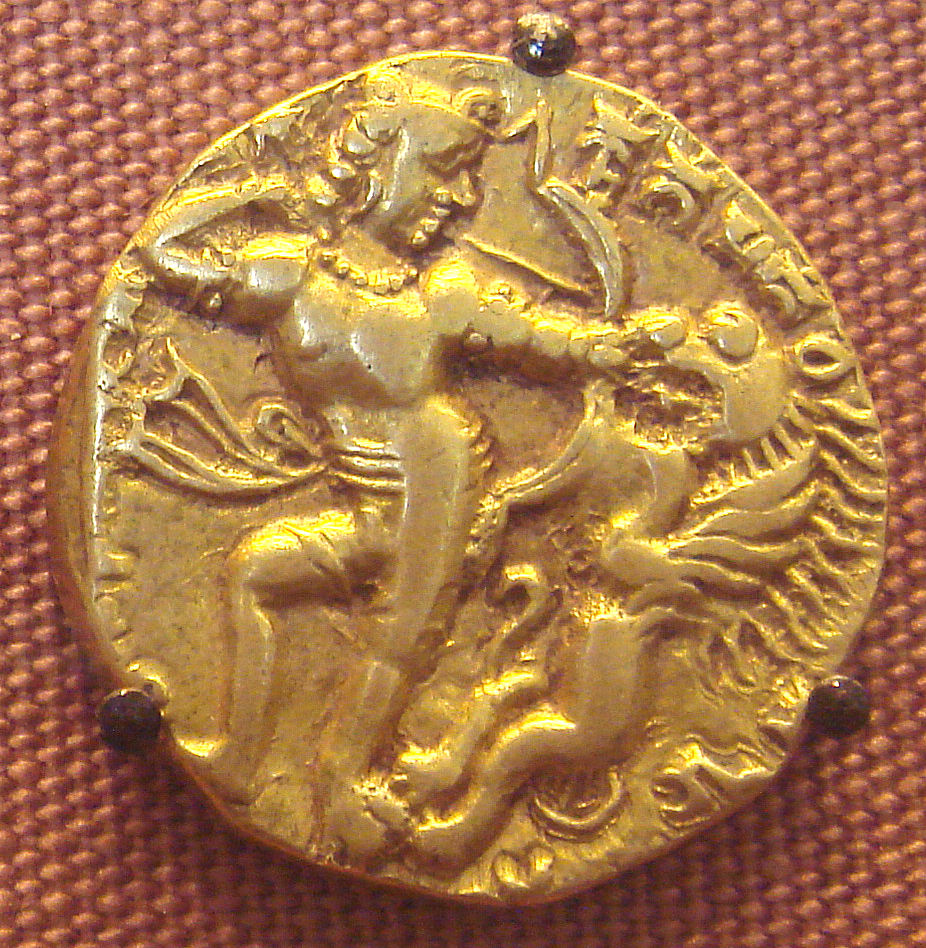
Gold coin of Gupta era, depicting a Gupta king holding a bow, 300 CE.

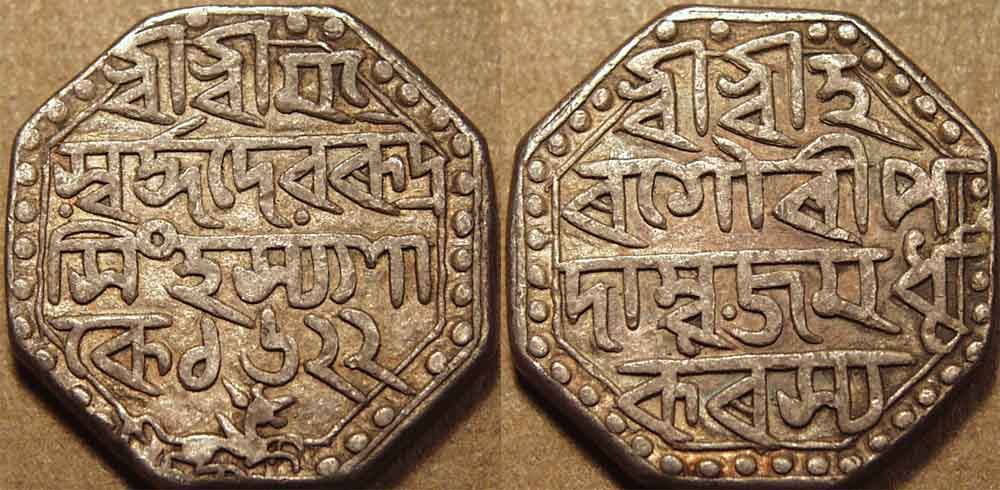
Silver Rupee coin of Rudra Simha of Ahom kingdom, 1696 CE.

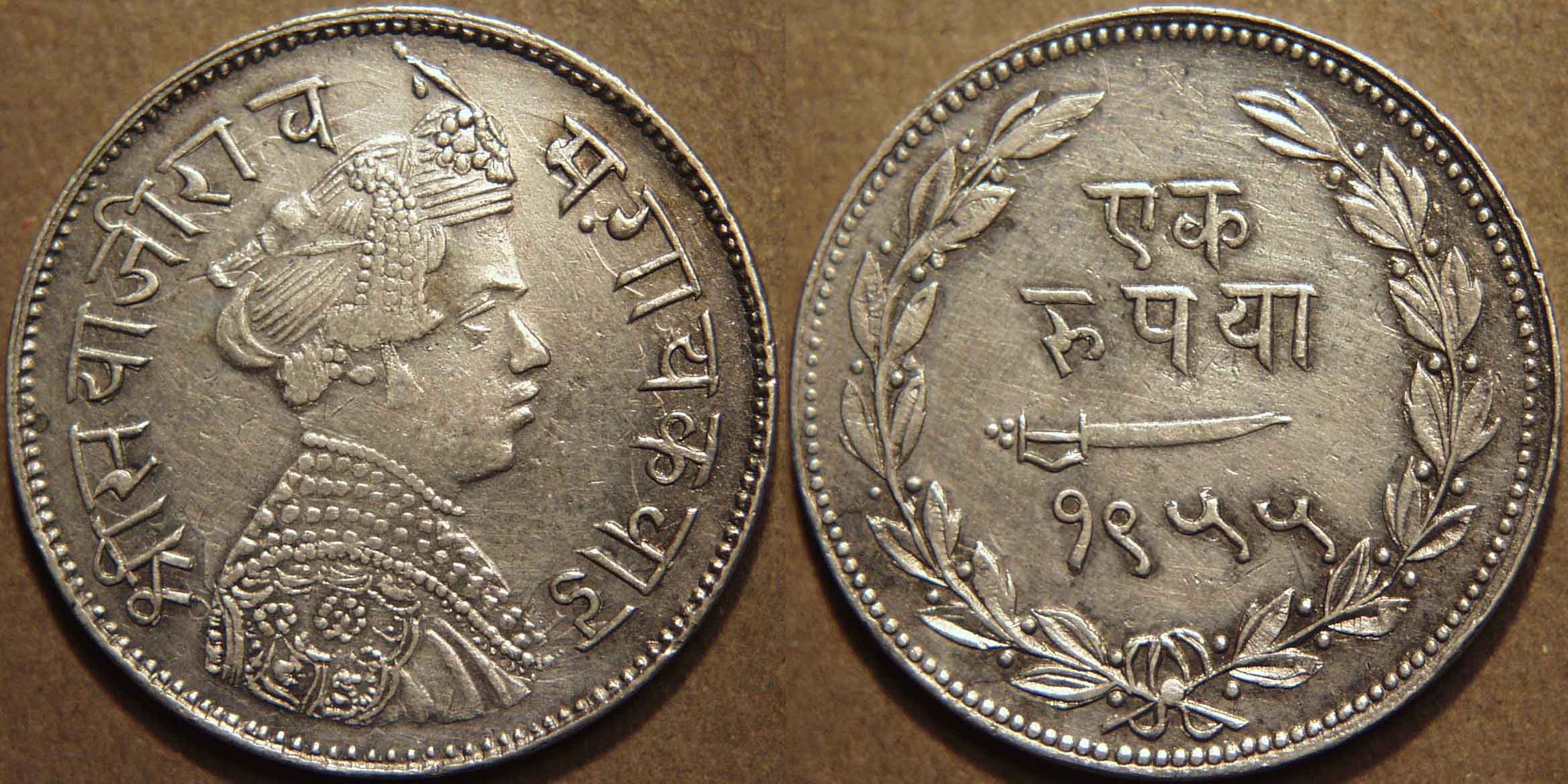
Silver Rupee of the Maratha Kingdom of Baroda, Sayaji Rao III, 1870 CE.

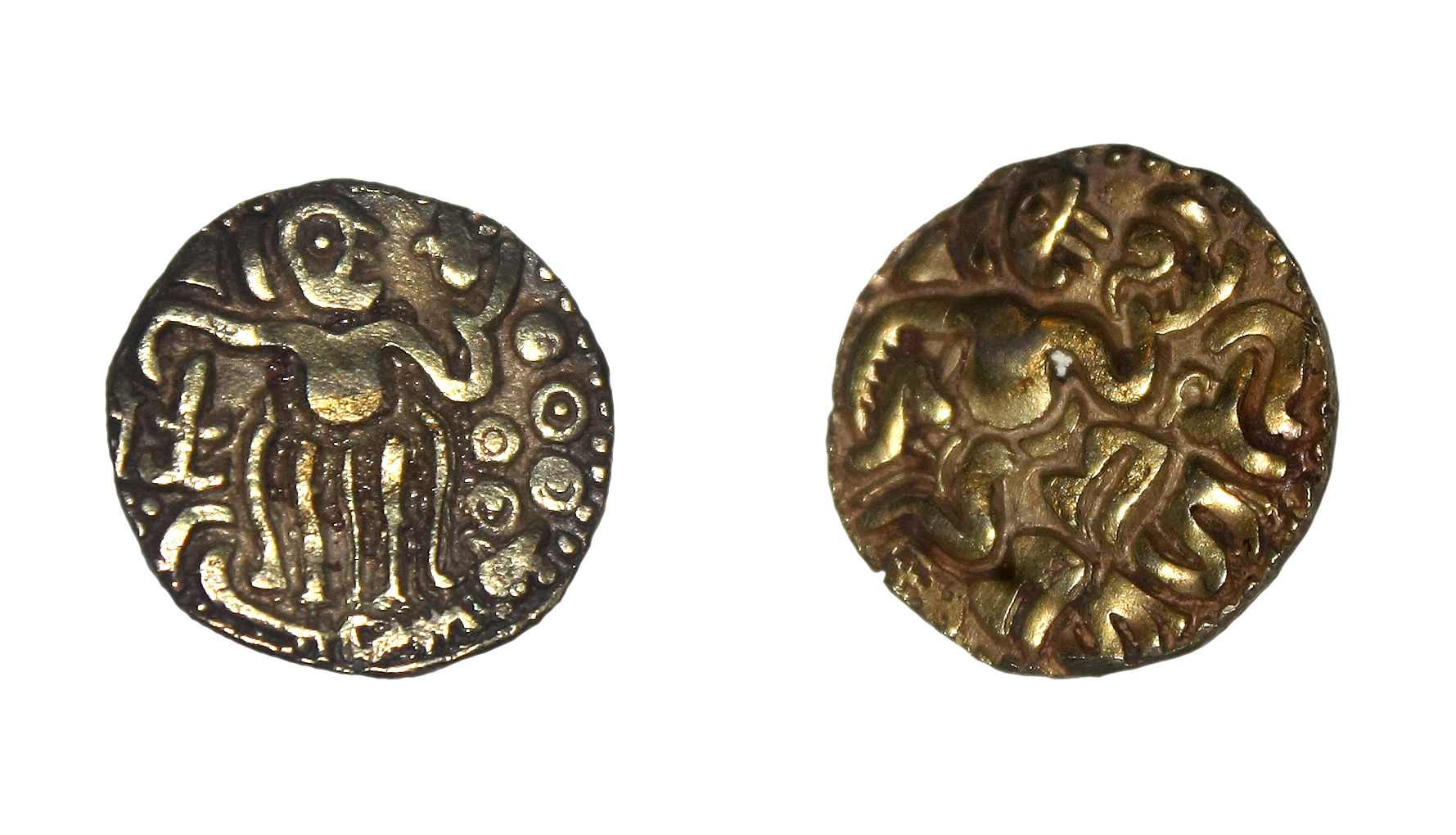
Gold coin of Raja Raja Chola I, 985–1014 CE.

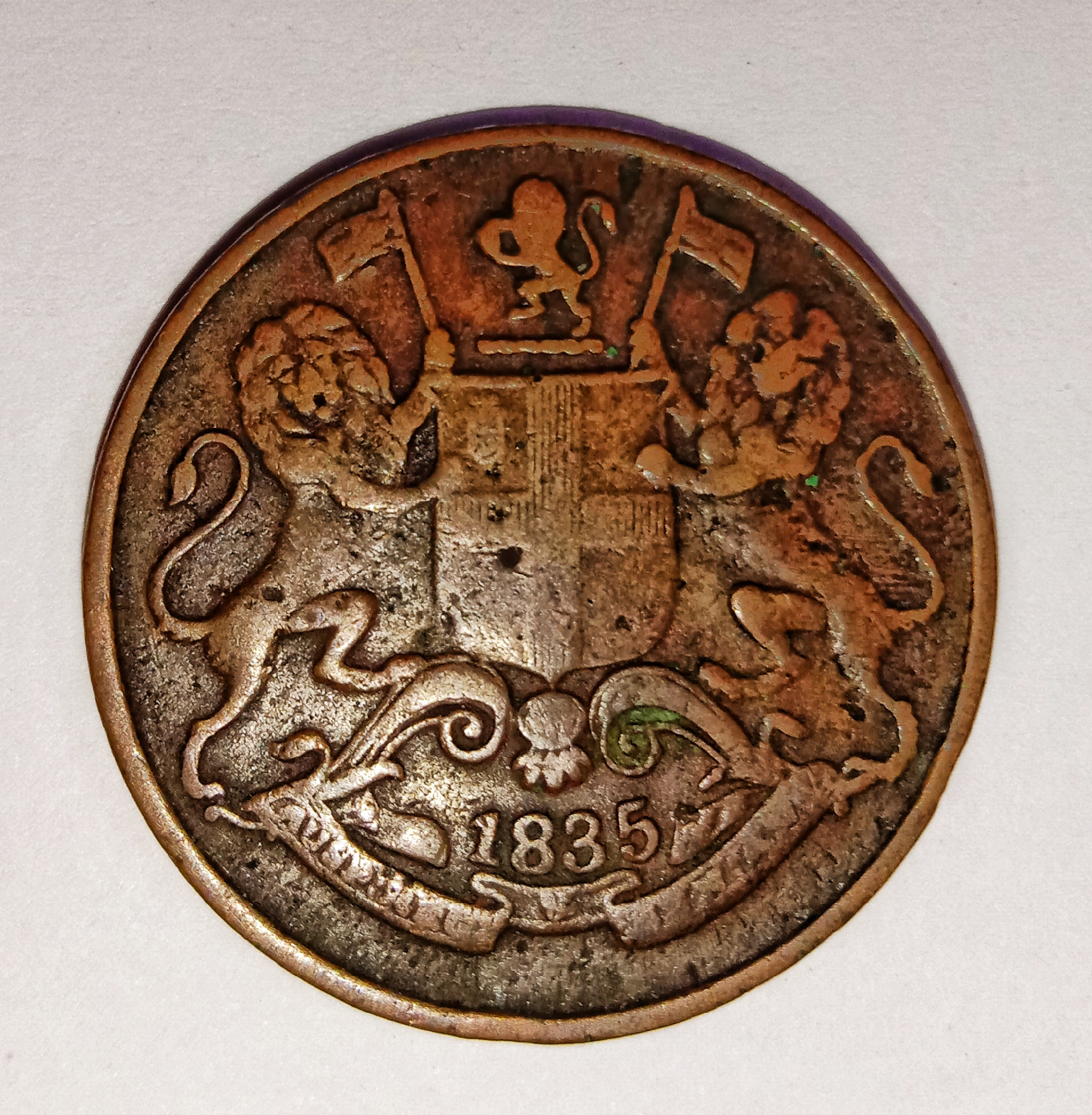
One Quarter Anna of 1835, bearing the arms of East India Company.

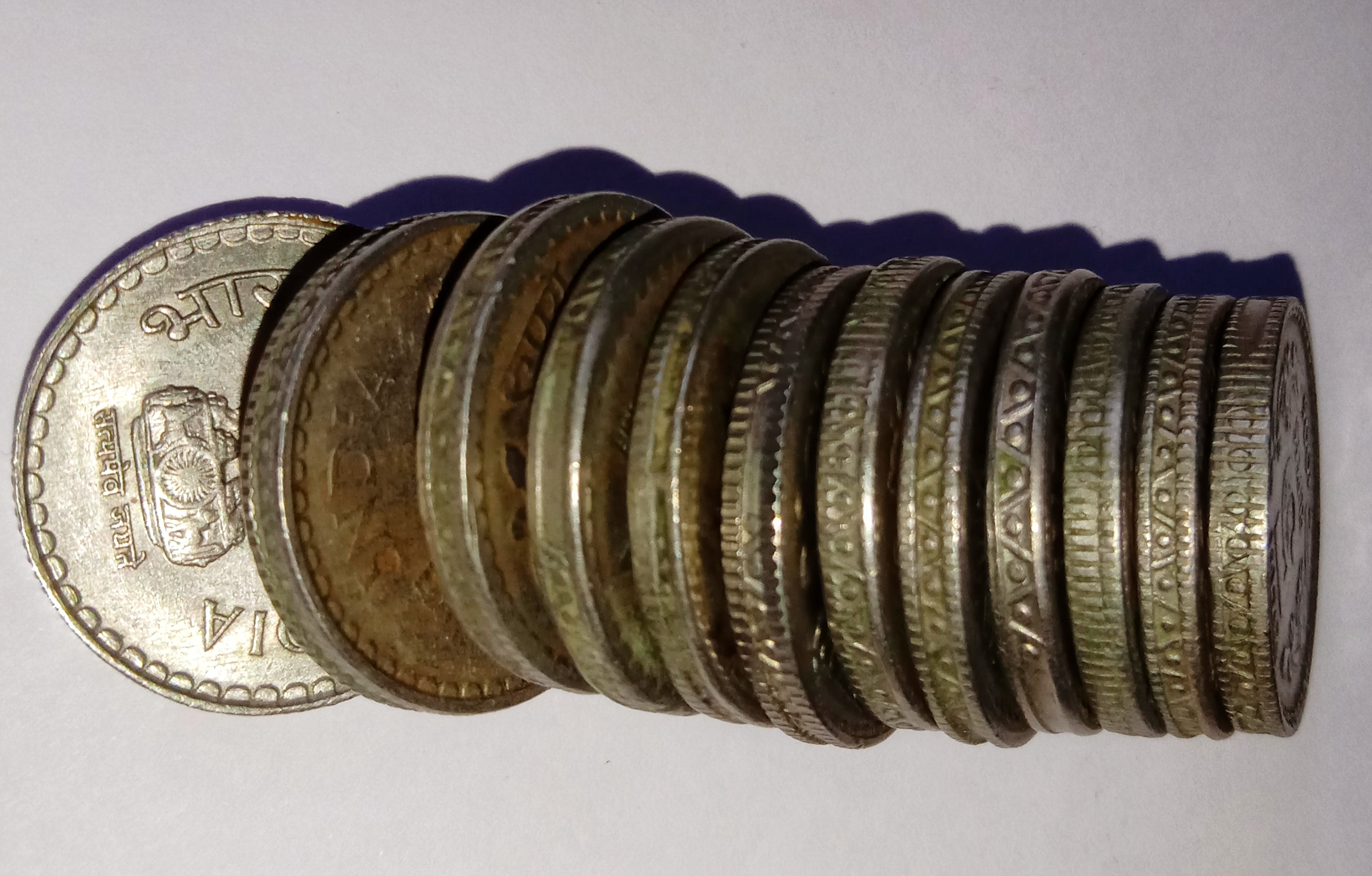
Milled edges of the Indian five Rupee coins

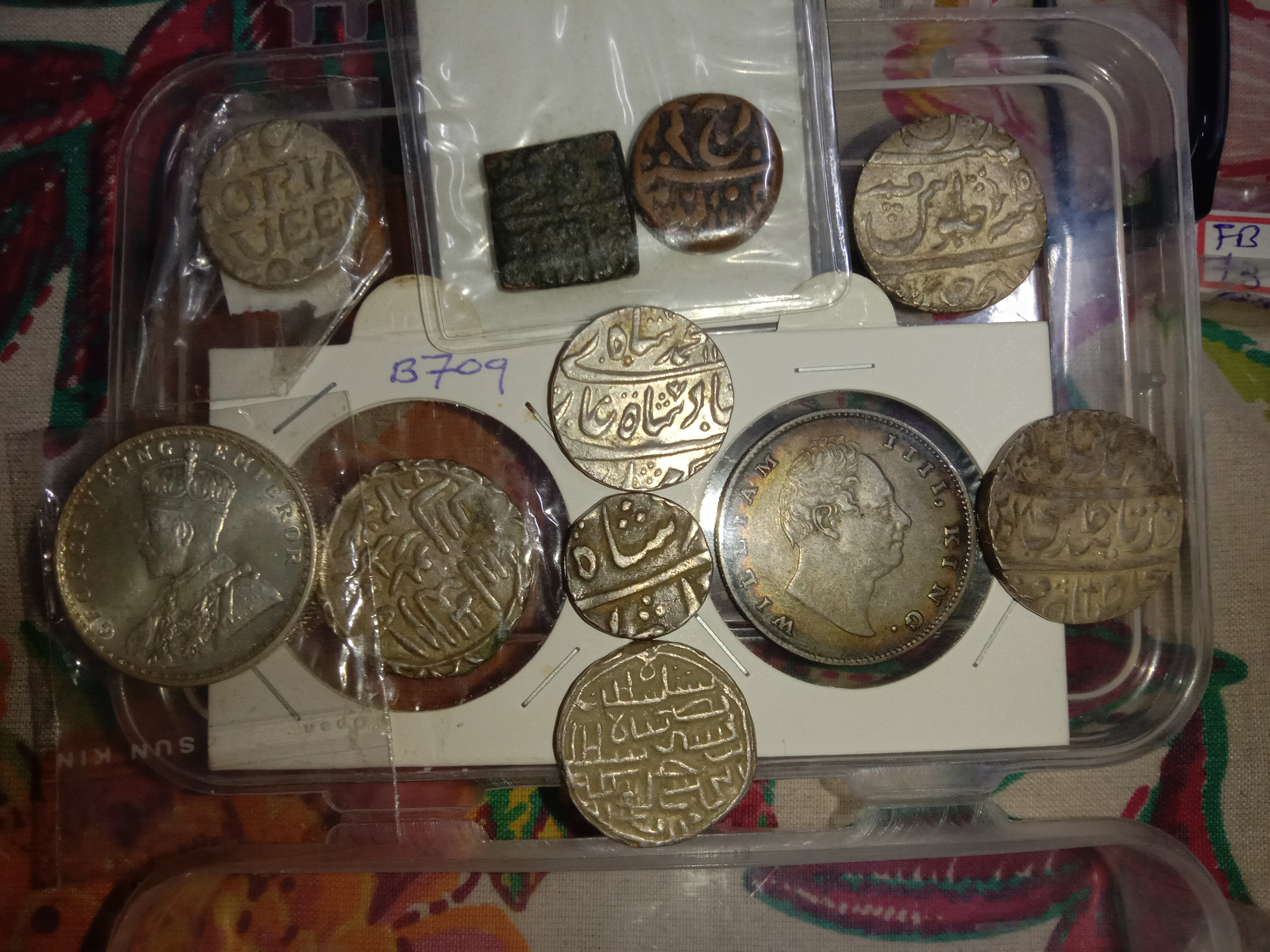
Numismatic items from Ancient, medieval and British India, made of silver.

== See also ==
- Coinage of Asia
- History of the rupee
- Indian rupee
- Coins of the Indian rupee
- Pre-modern coinage in Sri Lanka
- Rakhaldas Bandyopadhyay
