= Post-Mauryan coinage of Gandhara =

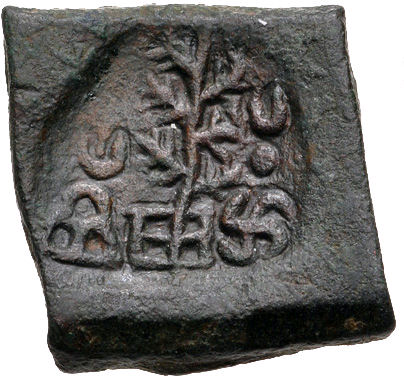
Taxila local single-dye coinage. (220-185 BCE). This early coins displays an arched-hill symbol, a tree-in-railing, a Nandipada and a Swastika. The reverse is blank.

The Post-Mauryan coinage of Gandhara refers to the period of coinage production in Gandhara, following the breakup of the Maurya Empire (321-185 BCE). When Mauryan central power disappeared, several small independent entities were formed, which started to strike their own coins, defining a period of Post-Mauryan coinage that ends with the rise of the Gupta Empire in the 4th century CE. This phenomenon was particularly precocious and significant in the area of Gandhara in the northwest, and more particularly in the city of Taxila, in modern-day Pakistan.

== Technology ==
=== Punch-marked coinage ===
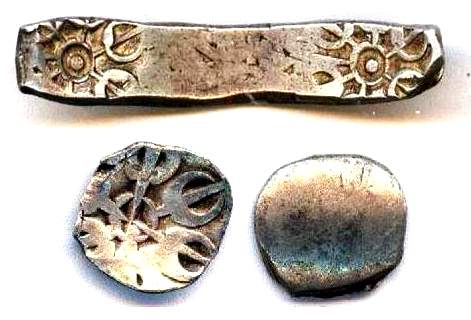
Coins of early Gandhara Janapada: AR Shatamana and one-eighth Shatamana (round), Taxila-Gandhara region, c. 600–300 BCE. This coinage was minted under Achaemenid administration in Gandhara.

These political changes were accompanied by technological changes in coin production techniques. Before the collapse of the Maurya Empire, the main type of coinage was punch-marked coins. After manufacturing a sheet of silver or silver alloys, coins were cut out to the proper weight, and then impressed by small punch-dies. Typically from 5 to 10 punch dies could be impressed on one coin.

=== Cast die-struck coinage ===
The types of coins were replaced at the fall of the Maurya Empire by cast, die-struck coins. Each individual coins was first cast by pouring a molten metal, usually copper or silver, into a cavity formed by two molds. These were then usually die-struck while still hot, first on just one side, and then on the two sides at a later period. The coin devices are Indian, but it is thought that this coin technology was introduced from the West, possibly from the neighboring Greco-Bactrian Kingdom.

== Coin types ==
=== Single-die coins ===
The most ancient of the coins are those that were die-cast on one side only, the other side remaining blank. They seem to start as early 220 BCE, that is, already in the last decades of the Maurya Empire. Some of these coins were created before the Indo-Greek invasions (dated to circa 185 BCE, start of the Yavana era), while most of the others were created later. These coins incorporate a number of symbols, in a way which is very reminiscent of the previous punch-marked coins, except that this time the technology used was cast single die-struck coinage.

==== Single-die coins before Indo-Greek invasions (220-185 BCE) ====
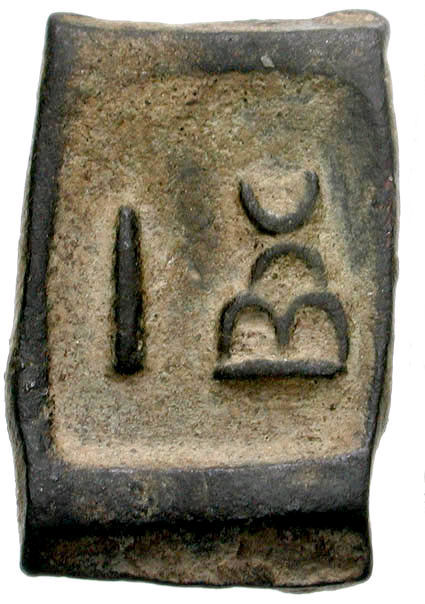
Taxila single-dye local coinage. Column and arched-hill symbol (220-185 BCE).

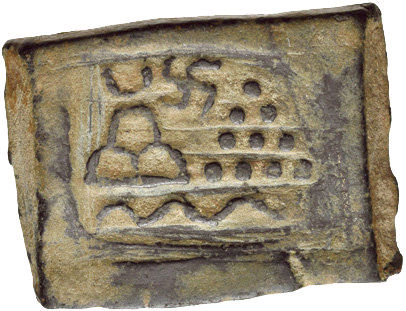
Taxila single-dye local coinage. Pile of stones, hill, river and Swastika (220-185 BCE).

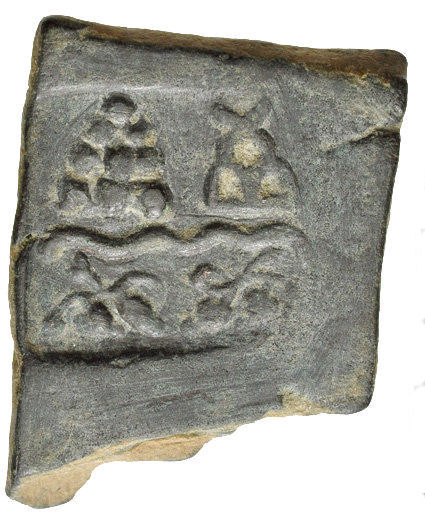
Taxila single-dye coin. Pile of stones, hill, river and unknown symbols (220-185 BCE).

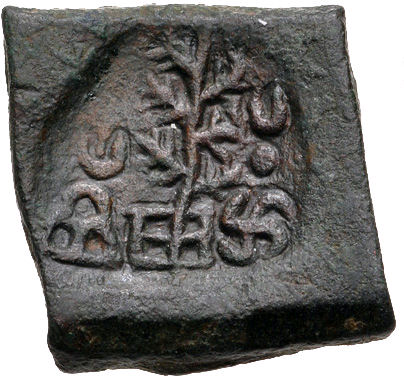
Taxila local single-dye coinage (220-185 BCE).

==== Single-dye coins after the Indo-Greek invasions (185 BCE) ====
The year 185 BCE is the approximate date the Greco-Bactrians invaded India. This date marks an evolution in the design of single-die cast coins, as deities and realistic animals were introduced. At the same time coinage technology also evolved, as double-die coins (engraved on both sides, obverse and reverse) started to appear. The archaeological excavations of coins have shown that these coins, as well as the new double die coins, were contemporary with those of the Indo-Greeks. According to Osmund Bopearachchi these coins, and particularly those depicting the goddess Lakshmi, were probably minted by Demetrius I following his invasion of Gandhara.

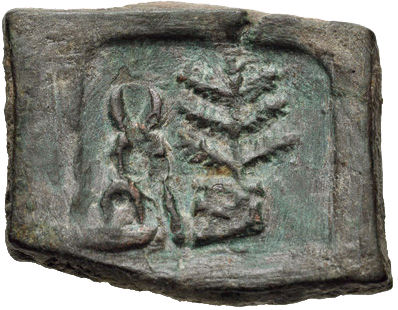
Taxila coin with hill and tree-in-railing (185-168 BCE).

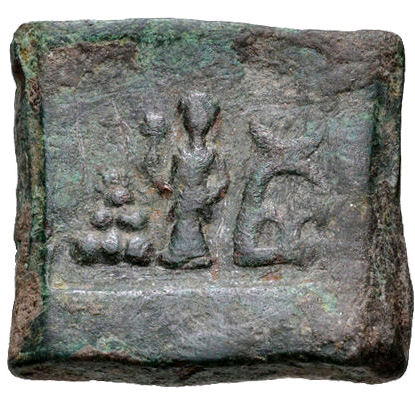
Taxila single-dye coin with Lakshmi and arched-hill symbol (185-160 BCE).

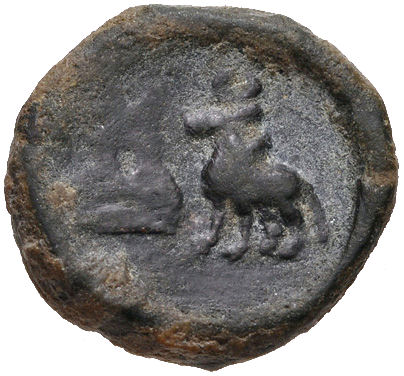
Taxila single dye coin with bull and arched-hill symbol (185-168 BCE).

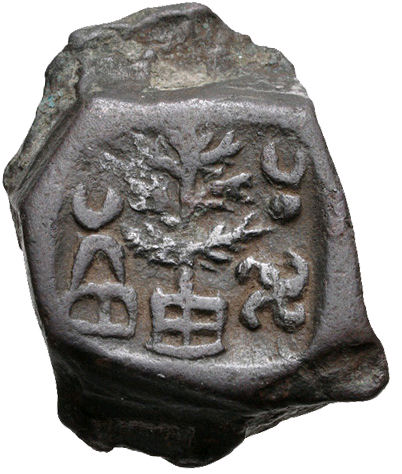
Taxila coin (185-168 BCE).

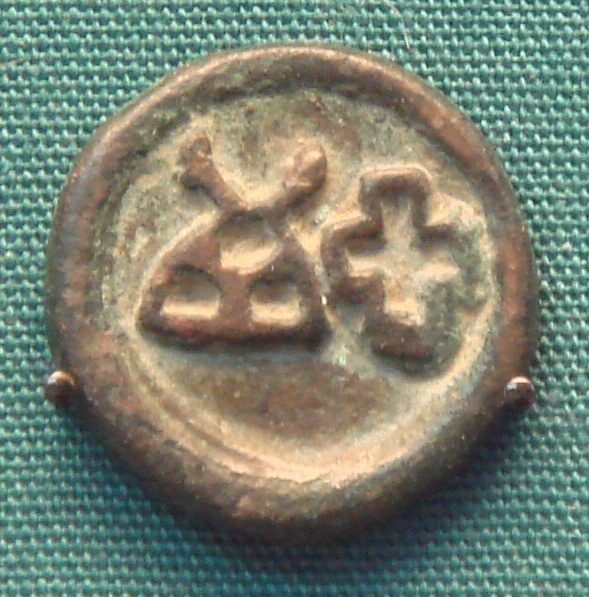
Taxila coin.

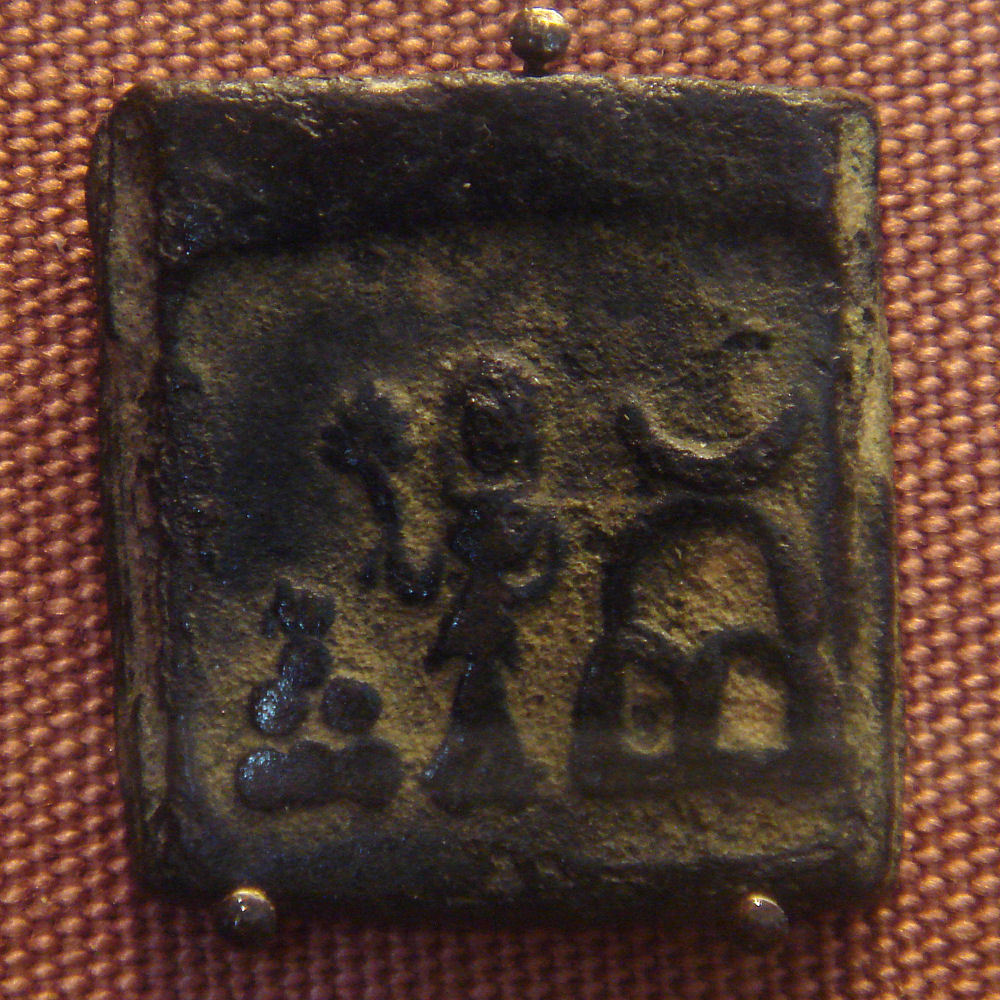
Taxila coin.ye

=== Double-d coins (185 BCE onward) ===
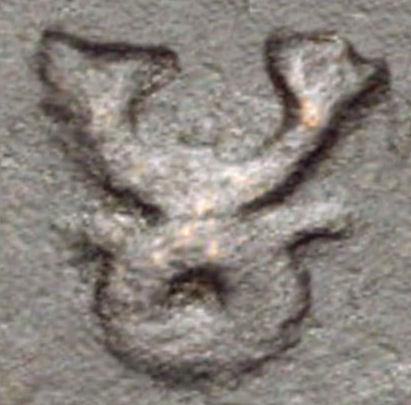
Triratna symbol on a Taxila coin, 185-168 BCE (detail).

Progressively, after 185 BCE and the Greek invasion, coins were cast on both sides. These coins are generally anonymous, and can carry Brahmi or Kharoshthi legends. These coins have quite specific types, depending mainly on the region where they were struck. Coins with a lion device are mainly known from Taxila, while coins with other symbols such as the Swastika or the Bodhi tree are attributed to the region of Gandhara. These coins were cast during the rule of Indo-Greek kings Pantaleon and Agathocles in the area of Gandhara, and they are generally contemporary with those of Indo-Greek rulers.

==== Symbolic designs ====
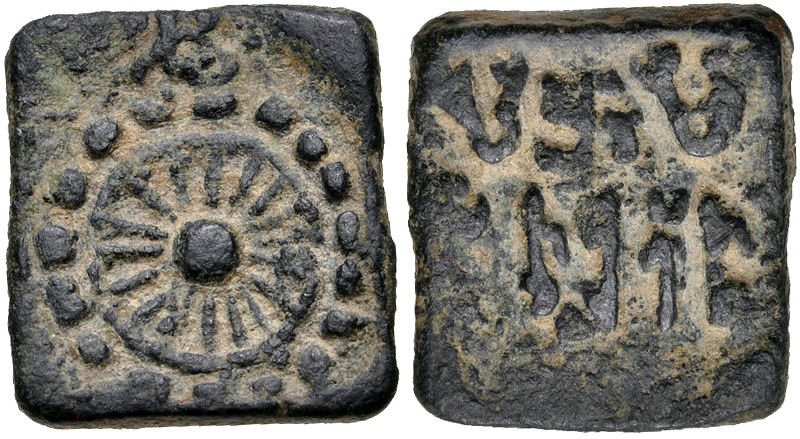
Taxila coin with wheel and Buddhist symbols. (185-160 BCE).

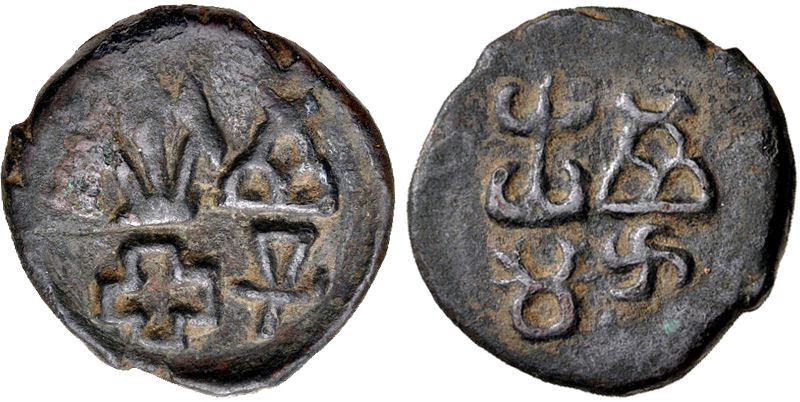
Taxila coin (circa 180 BCE).

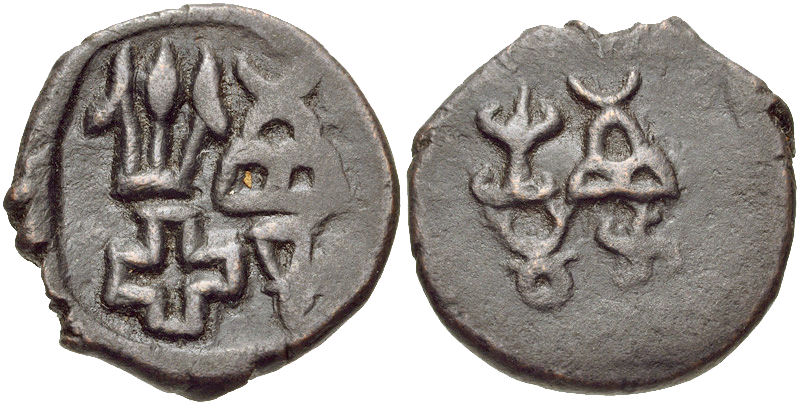
Taxila coin (circa 180 BCE).

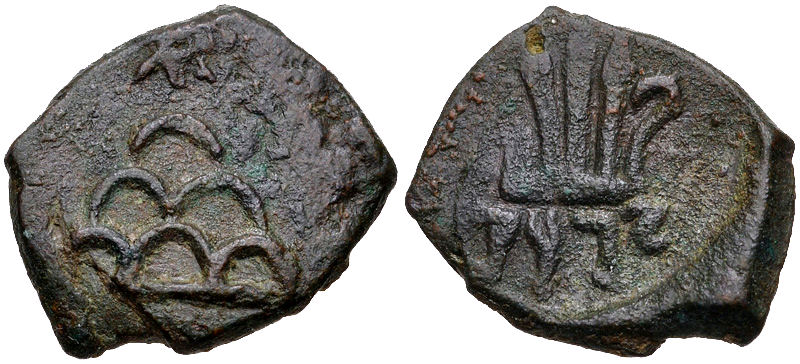
Taxila coin with hill, flame palmette plant and hirañasame "The Golden Hermitage" in Kharoshthi (185-168 BCE).

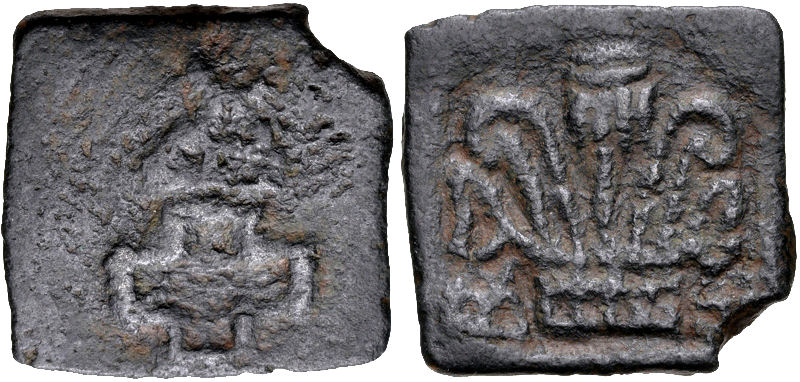
Taxila coin, with hill, empty cross and palmette (180-160 BCE).

==== Animal designs ====
Indo-Greek influence in the portrayal of the animal has been claimed, especially regarding the horses and lions of the Gandharan coins, which are said to be "distinctly Greek in style". The horse is generally shown with the specific symbol of a star. This design can be found in Greek coinage, such as that of Ophellas, a former officer of Alexander, as governor in Cyrene, North Africa.

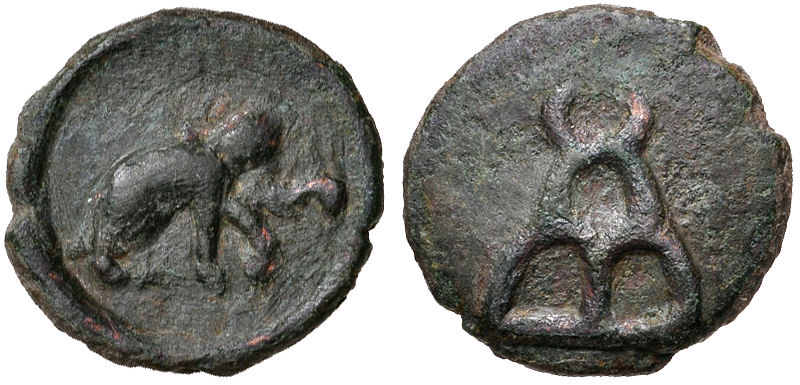
Taxila coin, elephant with arched-hill symbol (185-168 BCE).

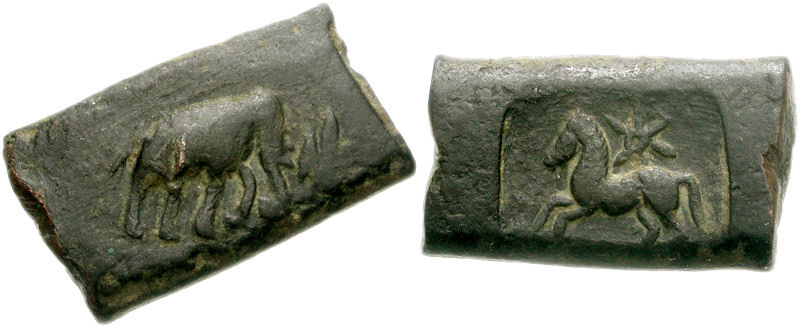
Taxila coin with elephant and horse under star (185-168 BCE).

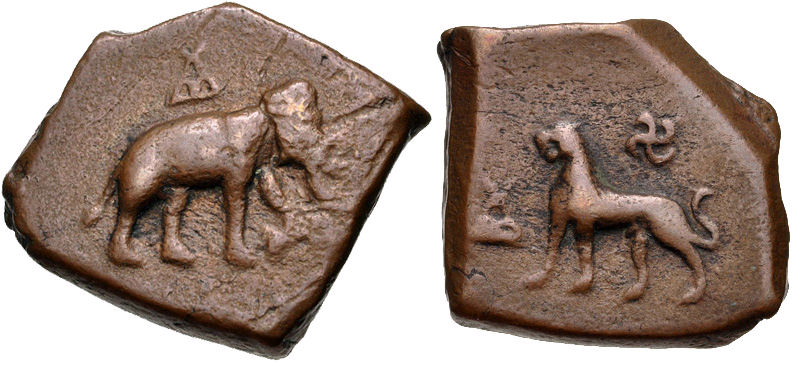
Taxila double-dye coin (185-168 BCE).

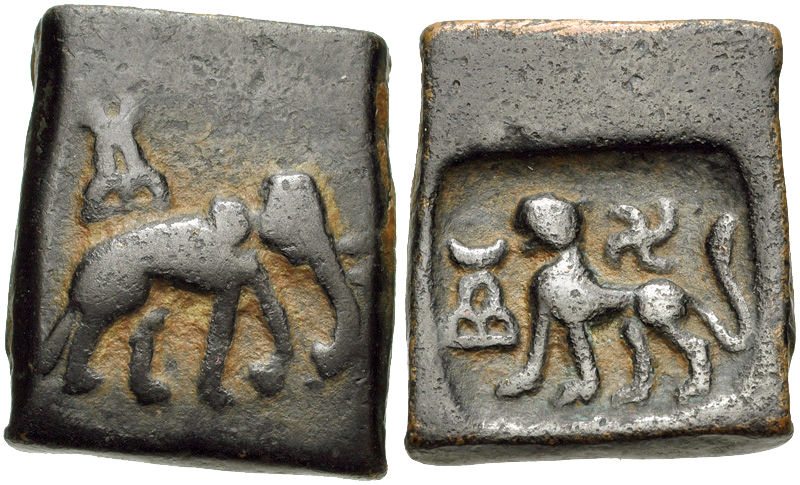
Taxila coin with elephant and lion (185-168 BCE)

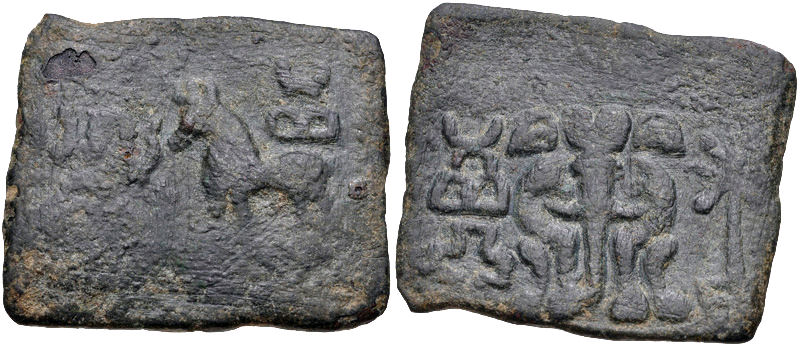
Taxila coin with horse and facing elephant (185-160 BCE).

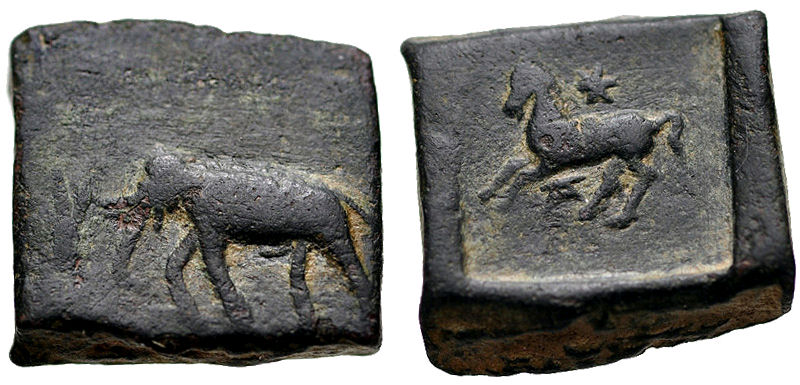
Taxila coin with elephant and horse (185-168 BCE)

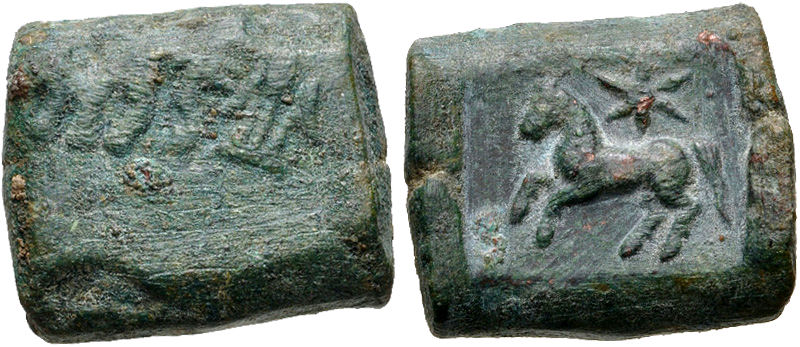
Pushkalavati coin with elephant and horse (185-168 BCE)

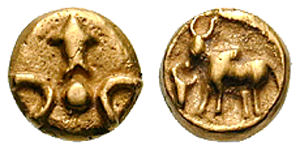
Taxila gold coin (185-170 BCE).

==== Anthropomorphic or textual designs ====
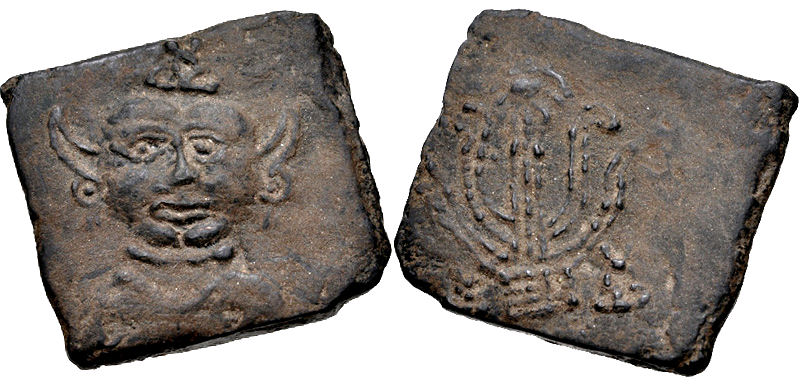
Demon with arched-hill symbol on top of the head, plant. (185-160 BCE).

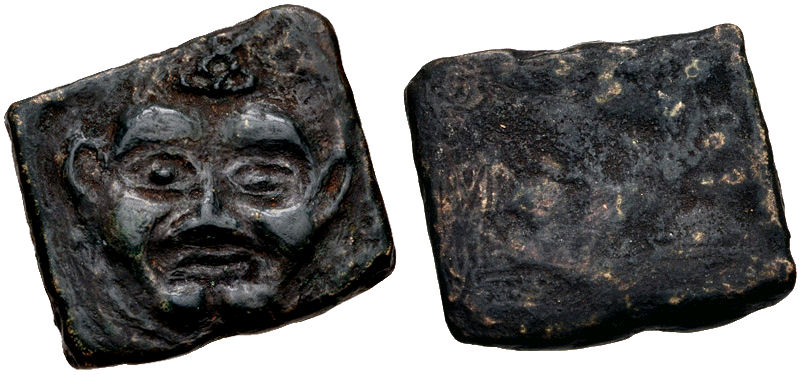
Taxila coin with demon and plant. (185-168 BCE).

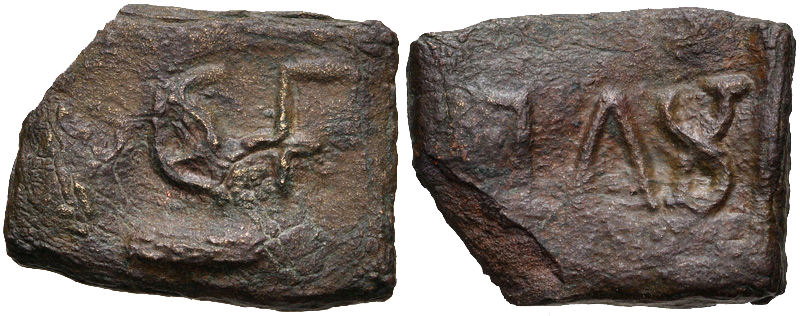
Taxila coin. Obverse: Negamā in Brahmi. Reverse Dojaka in Brahmi. (185-168 BC)

Later, humped or elephant images are known from Ayodhya, Kausambi, Panchala and Mathura. The coins of Ayodhia generally have a humped bull on the reverse, while the coins of Kausambi display a tree with railing.

== Indian-standard coinage of the Greeks (185 BCE onward) ==
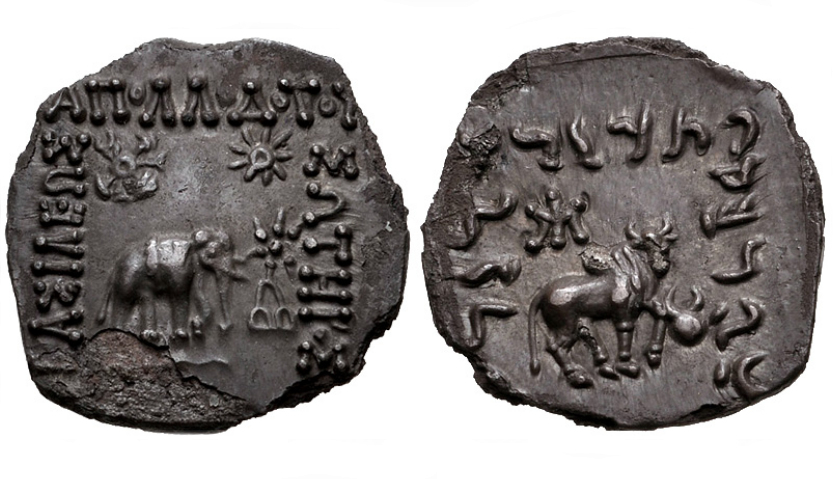
The first Indian coins of Apollodotus used Indian symbols. These coins associated the elephant with the Buddhist Chaitya or arched-hill symbol, sun symbols, six-armed symbol, and a river. The bull had a Nandipada in front. The symbol at the top of the bull is only a mint mark. These symbols disappeared soon after, and only the elephant and the bull remained.

The Indo-Greeks, following their invasion of the Indian subcontinent circa 185 BCE, in turn started to mint their own coins in the Indian standard (Indian weight, square shape, and less often round shape) with bilingual inscriptions, from the reign of Agathocles (190-180 BCE).

=== Symbolism ===
In addition to their own Attic coins, Greek kings thus started to issue bilingual Greek-Prakrit coins in the Indian standard, often taking over numerous symbols of the Post-Mauryan Gandhara coins, such as the arched-hill symbol and the tree-in-railing or Goddess Lakshmi at the beginning, and depictions of the bull and elephant later.

=== Legends ===
Several coins of king Agathocles use the Kharoshthi legend Akathukreyasa "Agathocles" on the obverse, and Hirañasame on the reverse (as one of the known coins of Taxila above). Hirañasame would mean "The Golden Hermitage", an area of Taxila (preferred interpretation), or if read 'Hitajasame would mean "Good-fame possessing", a direct translation of "Agathokles"

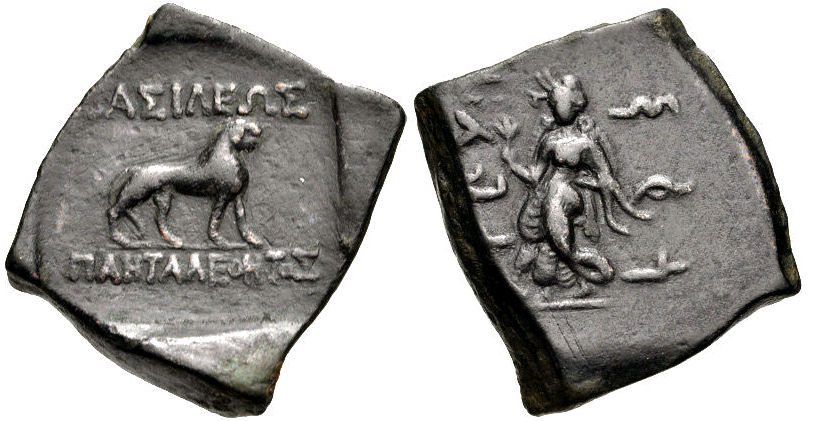
Coinage of Pantaleon with dancing woman (Lakshmi?) and lion.

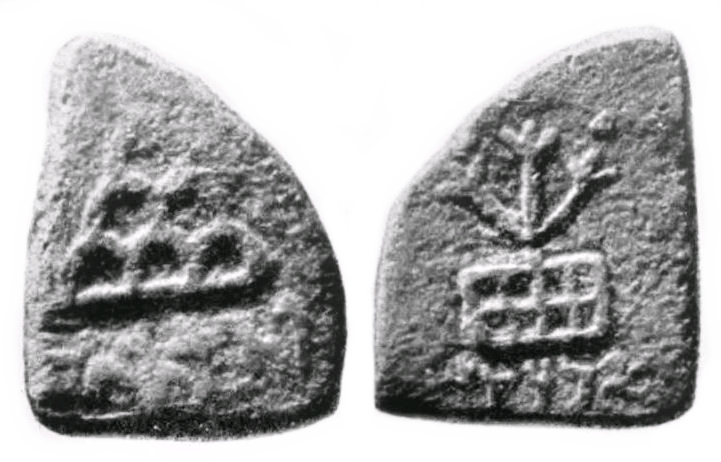
Coin of Agathocles. Obv Six-arched hill symbol with star on top, Kharoshthi legend Akathukreyasa "Agathocles". Rev Tree-in-railing and legend Hirañasame.

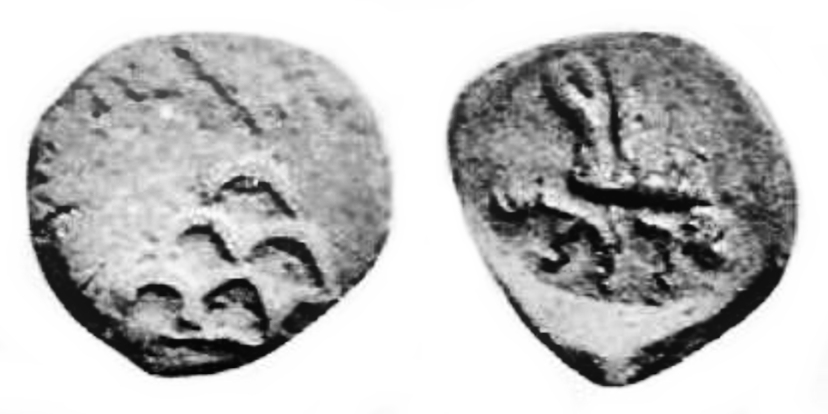
Coin of Agathocles. Obv Stupa surmounted by a star, Kharoshthi legend Akathukreyasa "Agathocles". Rev vegetal symbol and hirañasame (185-168 BCE).

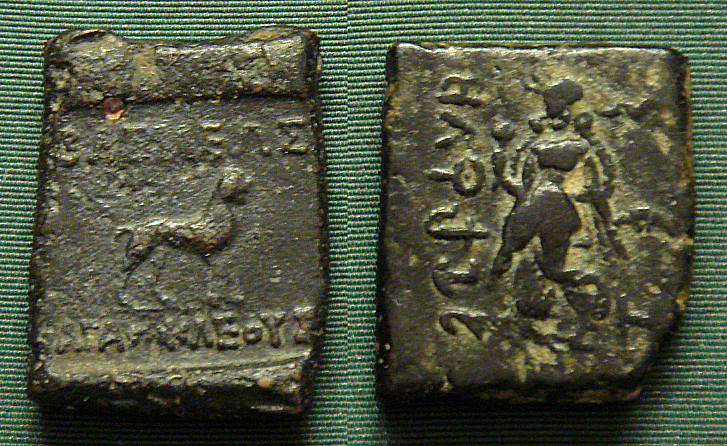
Indian coinage of Agathocles, with Buddhist lion and Lakshmi.

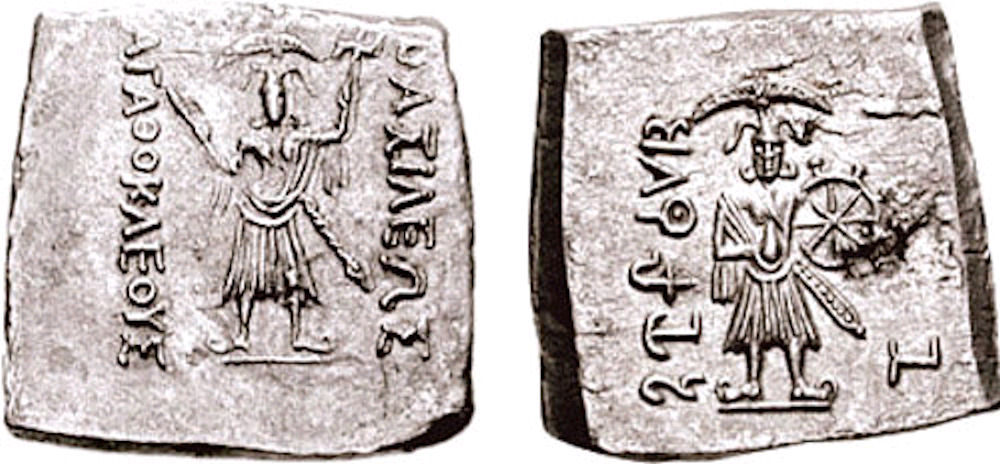
Coin of Agathocles with Hindu deities: Vasudeva-Krishna and Balarama-Samkarshana (found at Ai-Khanoum).

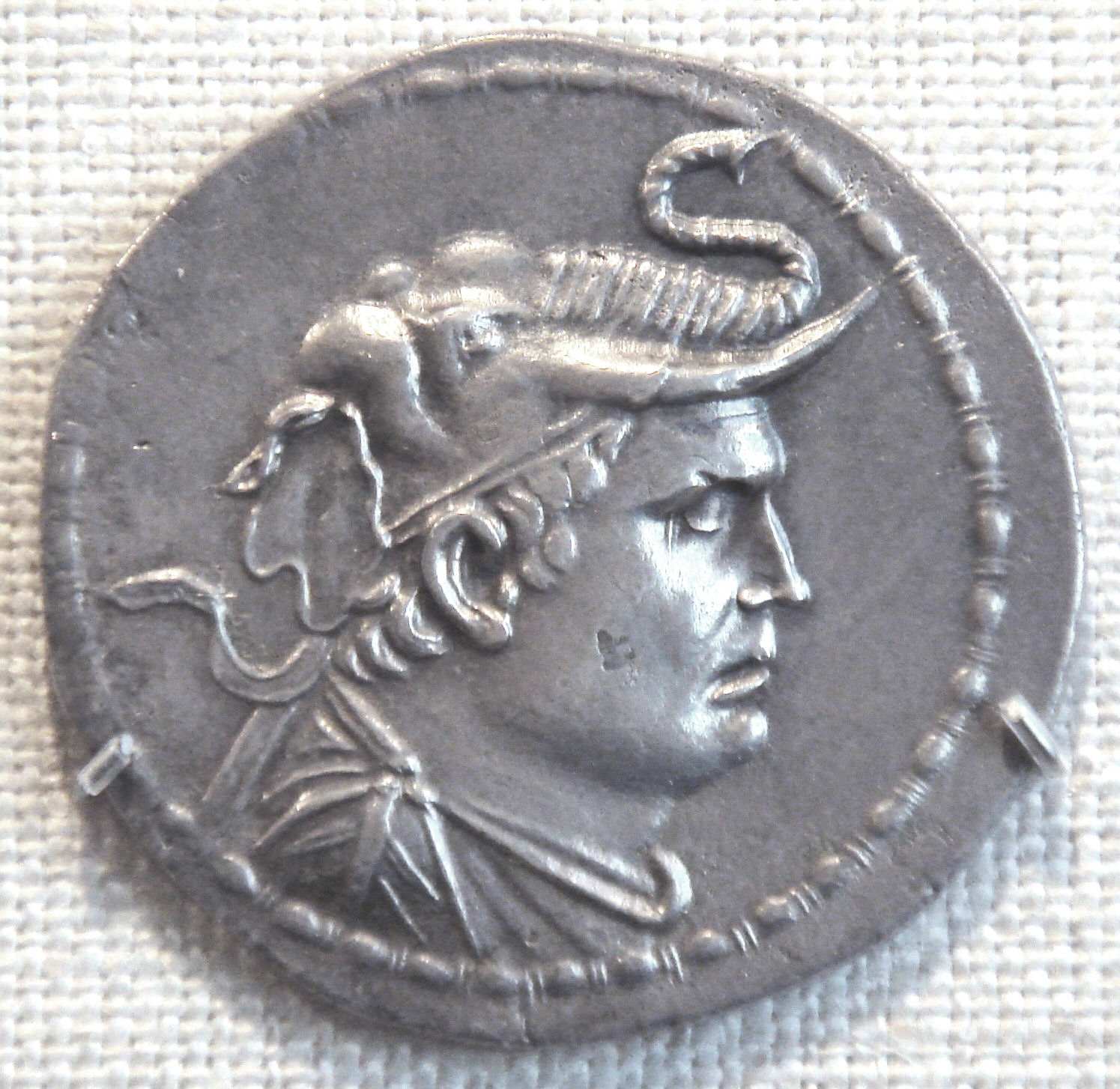
Coin of Demetrius I. Metropolitan Museum of Art.

=== Normalization ===
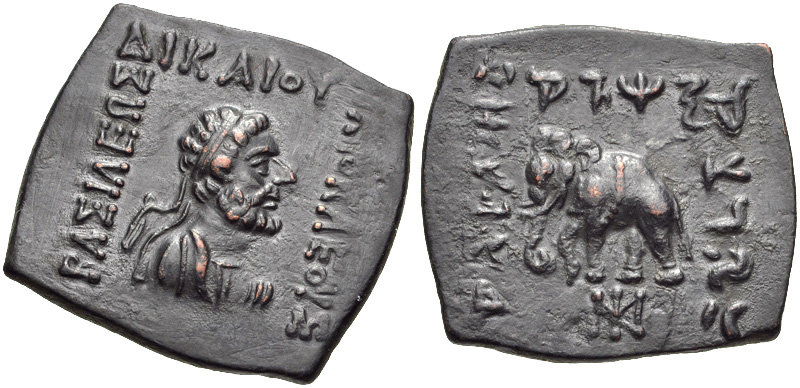
Bronze coin of Heliokles II (95-80 BCE) Obv: Bust of diademed king. Greek legend: BASILEOS DIKAIOU HELIOKLEOUS "Of King Heliocles the Just" Rev: Kharoshti (Indian) translation, elephant advancing left.

Later on, from the second half of the reign of Apollodotus I (ruled 180-160 BCE), legends would become standardized, with simply the King's name and attribute in Greek on the obverse and Kharoshthi Prakrit on the reverse. The usage of Indian symbols would become much more restrained, generally limited to the illustration of the elephant and the zebu bull. There are two major exceptions however: Menander I and Menander II used the Indian Wheel of the Law on some of their coins, suggesting an affiliation with Buddhism, which is also described in literary sources.

However the usage of bilingualism would endure, at first coexisting with Attic-standard coins, and later becoming exclusive. The last Indo-Greek kings even went as far as issuing some Prakrit-only coinage. The period of Indo-Greek coinage in northwestern India would last until the beginning of our era.

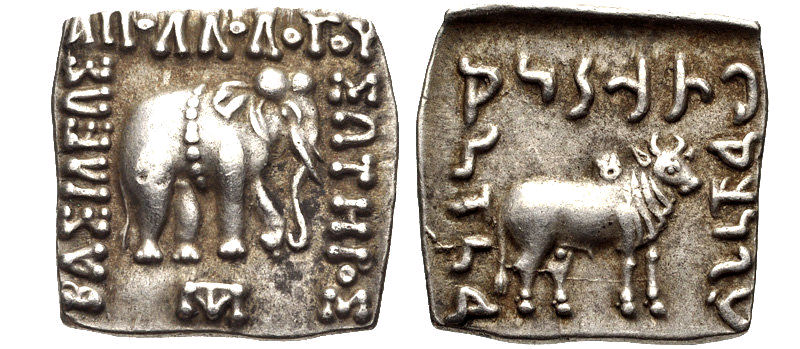
Coin of Apollodotus I (180-160 BCE).

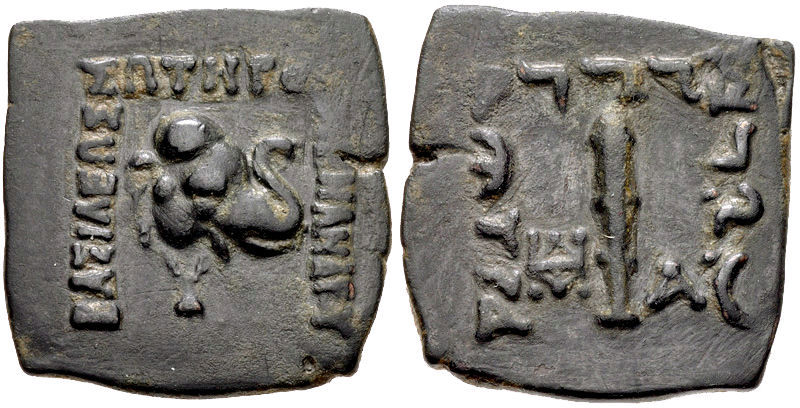
Menander I (155-130 BCE) coin with elephant.

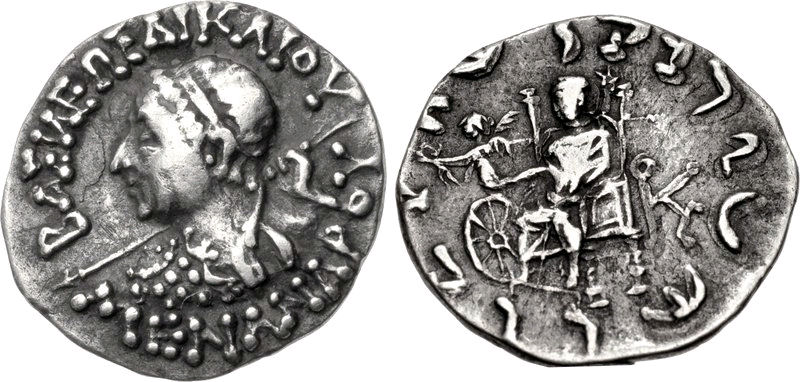
Silver Drachm of Menander II (95-80 BCE) with Zeus and Nike handing a victory wreath to a Wheel of the Law

Indo-Greek coinage in Gandhara would continue for nearly two centuries, until it was taken over by the coinage of the Indo-Scythians, the Indo-Parthians and the Yuezhi (future Kushans).

== See also ==
- Coinage of India
