= Refuge in Buddhism =

Initiation ceremony in Buddhism

Translations of refuge
- Sanskrit: शरण (IAST: śaraṇa)
- Pali: saraṇa
- Bengali: শরন (shôrôn)
- Burmese: သရဏ (tharana)
- Chinese: 皈依 (Pinyin: guīyī)
- Japanese: 帰依 (Rōmaji: kie)
- Khmer: សរណៈ (saranak)
- Korean: 귀의 (RR: gwiui)
- Sinhala: සරණ (saraṇa)
- Tagalog: salanam (Baybayin: ᜐᜎᜈᜋ᜔)
- Tamil: சரணம் (saranam / saran)
- Thai: สรณะ, ที่พึ่ง ที่ระลึก (RTGS: sarana, thi phueng thi raluek)
- Vietnamese: quy y

Translations of three jewels
- English: three jewels, three treasures, triple gem
- Sanskrit: त्रिरत्न, रत्नत्रय (IAST: triratna, ratna-traya)
- Pali: tiratana, ratanattaya
- Burmese: ရတနာသုံးပါး (jadanà θóuɴ bá)
- Chinese: 三宝, 三寶 (Pinyin: sānbǎo)
- Indonesian: triratna, tiga permata, tiga mestika
- Japanese: 三宝 (Rōmaji: sambō, sampō)
- Korean: 삼보 (RR: sambo)
- Tibetan: དཀོན་མཆོག་གསུམ, (dkon mchog gsum)
- Thai: ไตรรัตน์, รัตนตรัย (RTGS: trairat, rattanatrai)
- Vietnamese: tam bảo

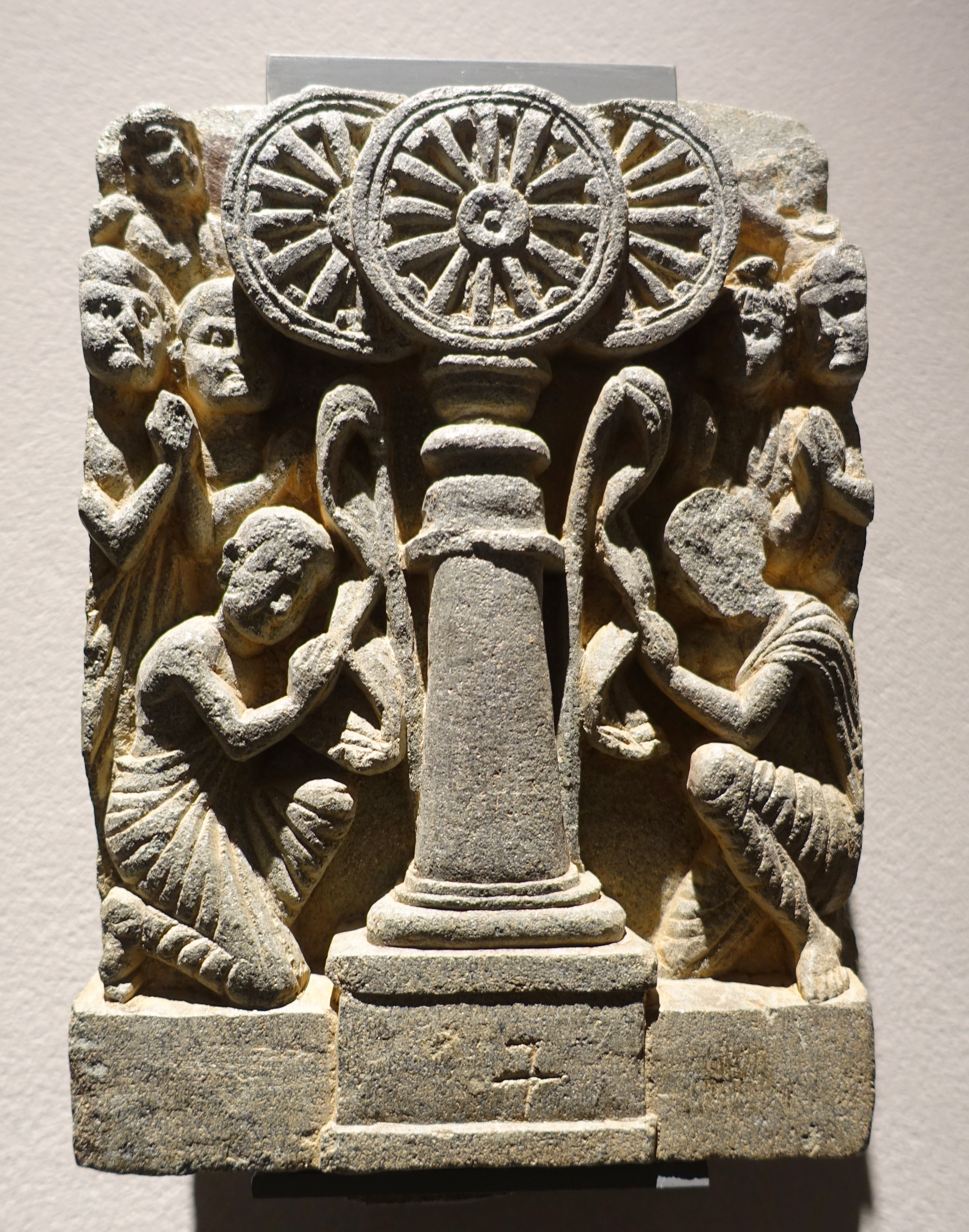
Veneration of the Three Jewels, Chorasan, Gandhara, 2nd century AD, schist – Ethnological Museum of Berlin

In Buddhism, refuge or taking refuge is a religious practice which often includes a prayer or recitation performed at the beginning of the day or of a practice session. Its object is typically the Three Jewels (also known as the Triple Gem, Three Treasures, or Three Refuges, Pali: ti-ratana or ratana-ttaya; Sanskrit: tri-ratna or ratna-traya), which are the Buddha, the Dharma, and the Sangha. Taking refuge is a form of aspiration to lead a life with the Triple Gem at its core. In early Buddhist scriptures, taking refuge is an expression of determination to follow the Buddha's path, but not a relinquishing of responsibility. Refuge is common to all major schools of Buddhism.

Since the period of Early Buddhism, all Theravada and mainstream Mahayana schools only take refuge in the Triple Gem. However, the Vajrayana school includes an expanded refuge formula known as the Three Jewels and Three Roots.

== Overview ==
A Tibetan style Triratna (triple jewel) symbol

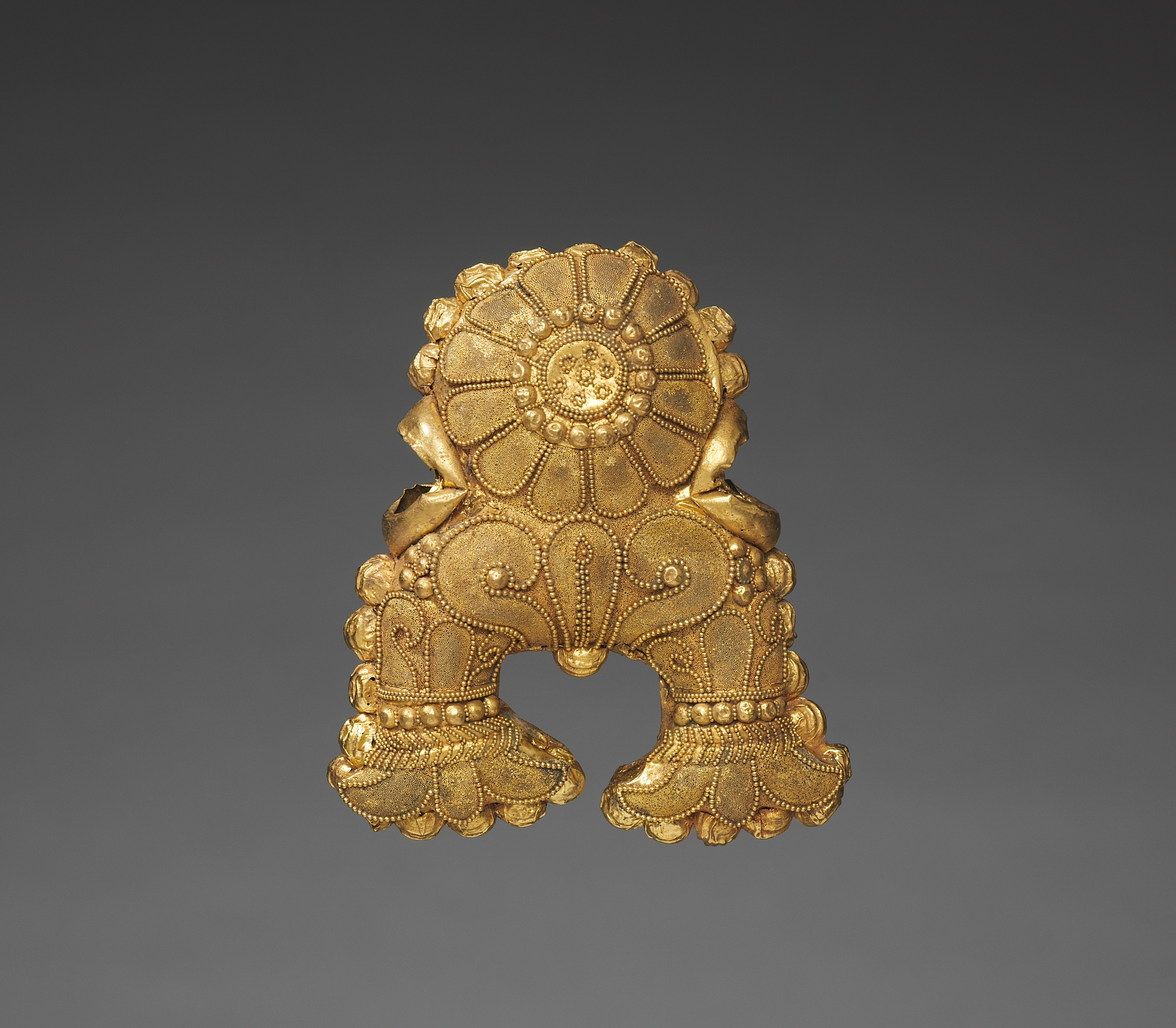
Triratna Pendant, Uttar or Madhya Pradesh, Shunga Period, Cleveland Museum of Art

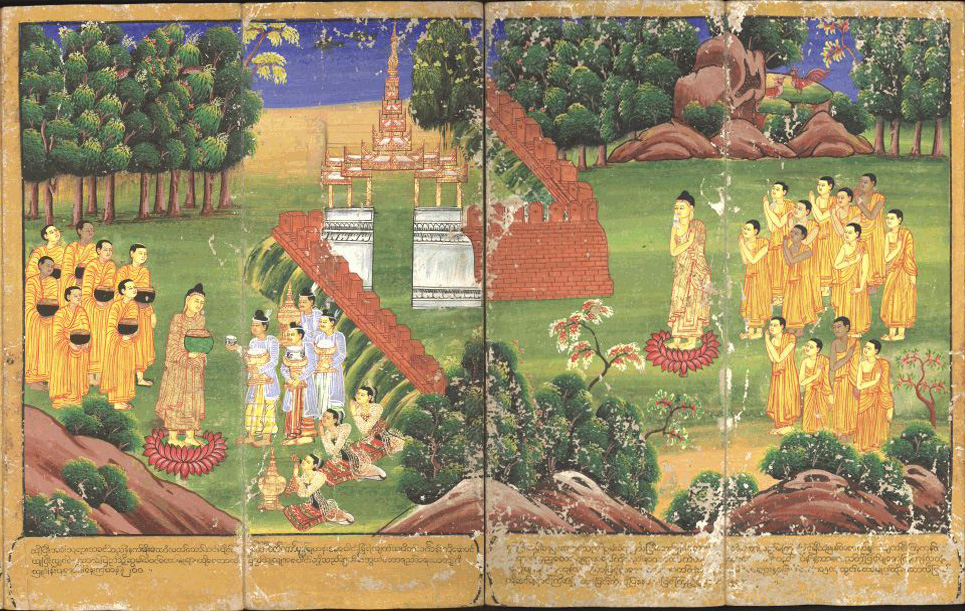
Shakyamuni Buddha and his followers, holding begging bowls, receive offerings. In the Pāli Canon, the Buddhist monk is given a significant role in promoting and upholding faith among laypeople.

Since the period of Early Buddhism, devotees have expressed their faith through the act of taking refuge, which is threefold. These are the three supports or jewels in which a Sutrayana Buddhist takes refuge:

- The Buddha, the fully enlightened one (i.e. the figure of Sakyamuni Buddha)
- The Dharma, the Buddhist teachings expounded by the Buddha
- The Sangha, the monastic order of Buddhism that practices and preserves the Dharma.

In this, it centres on the authority of a Buddha as a supremely awakened being, by assenting to a role for a Buddha as a teacher of both humans and devās (heavenly beings). This often includes other Buddhas from the past, and Buddhas who have not yet arisen. Secondly, the taking of refuge honours the truth and efficacy of the Buddha's spiritual doctrine, which includes the characteristics of phenomenon (Pali: saṅkhāra) such as their impermanence (Pali: anicca), and the Noble Eightfold Path to liberation. The taking of refuge ends with the acceptance of worthiness of the community of spiritually developed followers (the saṅgha), which is mostly defined as the monastic community, but may also include lay people and even devās provided they are nearly or completely enlightened. Early Buddhism did not include bodhisattvas in the Three Refuges, because they were considered to still be on the path to enlightenment.

Early texts describe the saṅgha as a "field of merit", because early Buddhists regard offerings to them as particularly karmically fruitful. Lay devotees support and revere the saṅgha, of which they believe it will render them merit and bring them closer to enlightenment. At the same time, the Buddhist monk is given a significant role in promoting and upholding faith among laypeople. Although many examples in the canon are mentioned of well-behaved monks, there are also cases of monks misbehaving. In such cases, the texts describe that the Buddha responds with great sensitivity to the perceptions of the lay community. When the Buddha sets out new rules in the monastic code to deal with the wrongdoings of his monastics, he usually states that such behavior should be curbed, because it would not "persuade non-believers" and "believers will turn away". He expects monks, nuns and novices not only to lead the spiritual life for their own benefit, but also to uphold the faith of the people. On the other hand, they are not to take the task of inspiring faith to the extent of hypocrisy or inappropriateness, for example, by taking on other professions apart from being a monastic, or by courting favours by giving items to the laypeople.

Faith in the three jewels is an important teaching element in both Theravada and Mahayana traditions. In contrast to perceived Western notions of faith, faith in Buddhism arises from accumulated experience and reasoning. In the Kalama Sutra, the Buddha explicitly argues against simply following authority or tradition, particularly those of religions contemporary to the Buddha's time. There remains value for a degree of trusting confidence and belief in Buddhism, primarily in the spiritual attainment and salvation or enlightenment. Faith in Buddhism centres on belief in the Three Jewels.

=== In Mahayana Buddhism ===
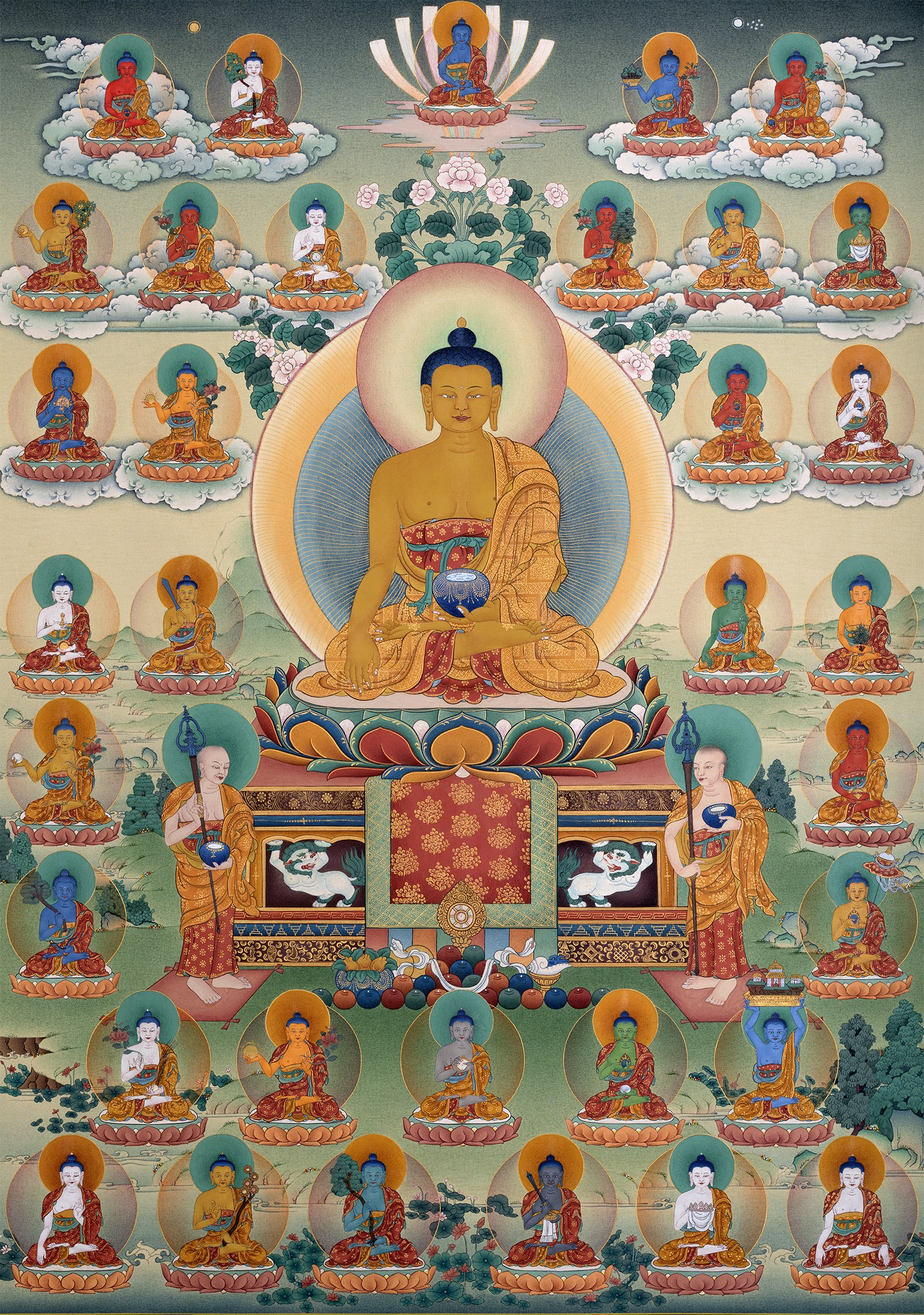
A Mahayana illustration of 35 Buddhas

In Mahayana Buddhism, the three jewels are understood in a different sense than in Sravakayana or non-Mahayana forms of Buddhism. For example, the Buddha is usually explained through the Mahayana doctrine of the three bodies (trikaya).

According to the Mahayana treatise titled Ratnagotravibhāga (Analysis of the Jeweled Lineage), the true meaning of the triple gem is as follows:

- The Buddha is without beginning, middle and end. The Buddha is peace. The Buddha is uncompounded (asamskrta), and spontaneous (anabhoga) Dharmakaya. The Buddha is self-enlightened and self arisen wisdom (jñana), compassion and power for the benefit of others.
- The Dharma is described as the reality which is cessation. This is described as neither existence nor non-existence. It is non-conceptual reality as well as the reality of the path which consists of luminous and stainless jñana that removes all defilement. It is also equated with the dharmakaya.
- The Sangha refers to those beings who realize the true luminous nature of the mind and the "full extent of what is" (yavad bhavikataya) as well as the supreme qualities that make them a refuge.

According to the Tibetan Buddhist master Longchenpa:

According to the Mahayana approach, the buddha is the totality of the three kayas; the dharma encompasses scriptural transmission (contained in the sutras and tantras) and the realization of one's self-knowing timeless awareness (including the views, states of meditative absorption, and so forth associated with stages such as those of development and completion); and the sangha is made up of bodhisattvas, masters of awareness, and other spiritually advanced beings (other than buddhas) whose nature is such that they are on the paths of learning and no more learning.

Thus, for Mahayana Buddhism, the Buddha jewel includes innumerable Buddhas (like Amitabha, Vajradhara and Vairocana), not just Sakyamuni Buddha. Likewise, the Dharma jewel includes the Mahayana sutras and (for certain sects of Mahayana) may also include the Buddhist tantras, not just the Tripitaka. Finally, the Sangha jewel includes numerous beings that are not part of the monastic sangha proper, including high level bodhisattvas like Avalokiteshvara, Vajrapani, Manjushri and so on.

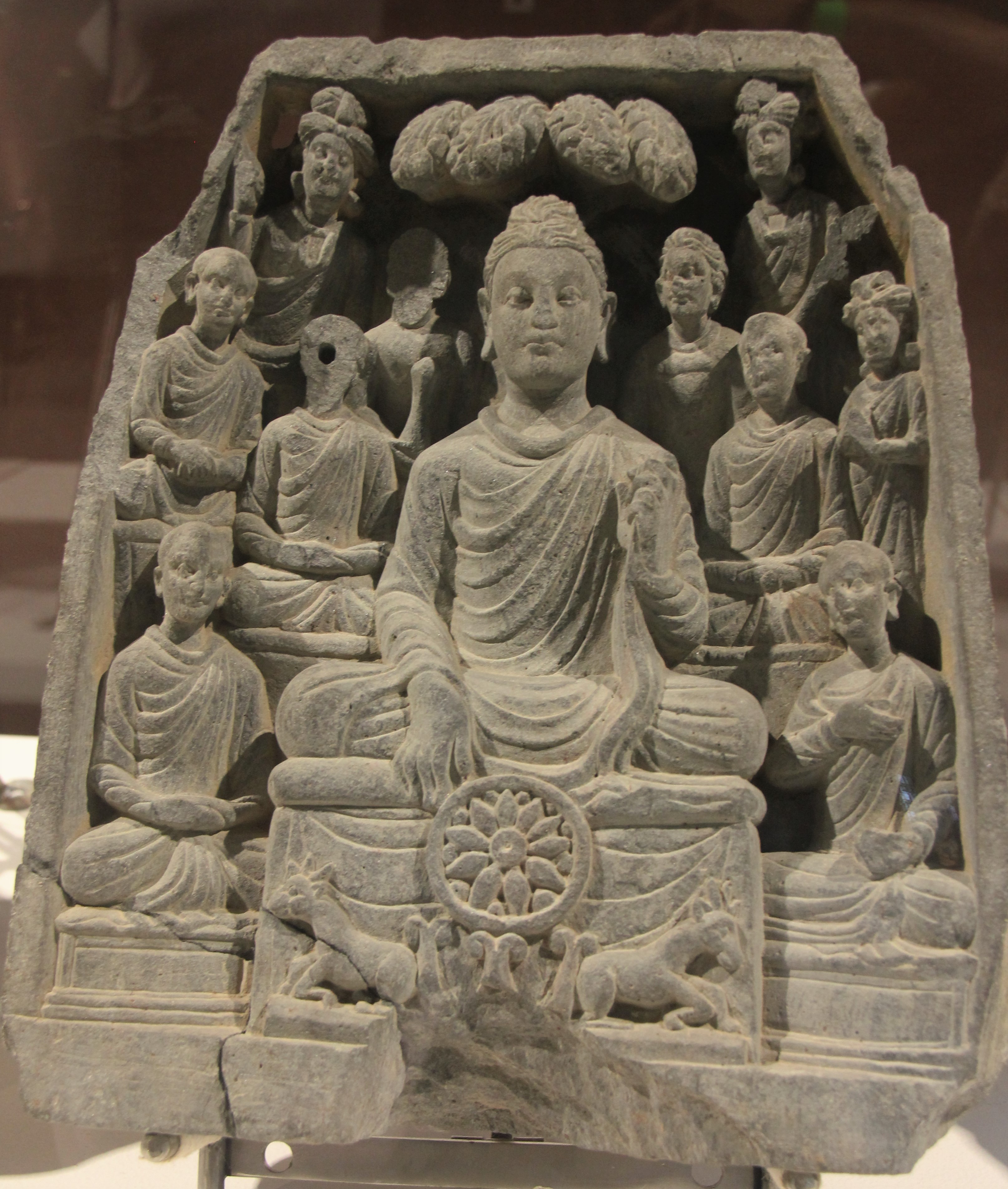
Gautama Buddha delivering his first sermon in the deer park at Sarnath, Varanasi with his right hand turning the Dharmachakra, resting on the Triratna symbol flanked on either side by a deer. Statue on display at the Chhatrapati Shivaji Maharaj Vastu Sangrahalaya in Mumbai.

==== Ultimate and partial refuges ====
According to the Śrīmālā Sūtra, the Dharma and Sangha are "partial refuges," while the Buddha, endowed with limitless compassion and unbounded by time, is the supreme and ultimate refuge. The Dharma and Sangha are limited refuges in relation to the Buddha because the Dharma attains the Dharmakāya, while the Sangha, being afraid, looks to the Tathāgata for refuge. Therefore, going for refuge in the Dharma and Sangha is ultimately to go for refuge in the Tathāgata, who is thus the supreme truth of the three jewels. Furthermore, the Dharma and Sangha are not separate from the Tathāgata, who is identical to the three refuges "because of the path of the One Vehicle" (Ekayāna). Additionally, according to the Śrīmālā Sūtra, of the Four Noble Truths, the noble truth of the extinction of suffering is the sole refuge, as it is permanent and separate from the conditioned reality. It is therefore neither false nor deceptive. Conversely, the other three noble truths are impermanent, conditioned, and are thus false and deceptive.

According to the Ratnagotravibhāga, the Buddha alone is considered to be a true and permanent refuge. This is because the Dharma (as doctrine) is like a boat that is ultimately abandoned. Also, the Dharma (as realization) is made up of the truth of the path and the truth of cessation, but the former is artificial and impermanent while the latter is, according to śrāvakas, a mere absence of defilement and suffering. An absence, or nonexistence, can be neither a refuge nor non-refuge. As for the Sangha, it is possessed of fear and has many things still to be done, having not yet attained perfect enlightenment. Being with fear, the Sangha goes for refuge in the Buddha. However, that which goes for refuge in others cannot be a refuge by itself. (Note: The Śrīmālā Sūtra also states, "...Lord, the refuge does not seek a refuge." Alex and Hideko Wayman comment, "That is to say, the Lord, being the refuge, of course does not seek a refuge. In the last analysis, we cannot call anyone a refuge who himself is seeking a refuge.") Therefore, the Ratnagotravibhāga considers the Dharma and Sangha to be temporary refuges, while the Buddha jewel is an eternal and lasting refuge. This is because the Buddha jewel possesses the Dharmakāya and neither arises nor disappears.

In Chan Buddhism, it is taught in the Platform Sūtra that, rather than take refuge in external buddhas, one should take refuge in the buddha within oneself. In the Platform Sūtra, Huineng urges his listeners to take refuge in the three jewels of their own essential nature. According to this explanation, "Buddha" refers to awareness, "Dharma" refers to truth, and "Sangha" to purity. The Platform Sūtra says:

Learned Audience, each of you should consider and examine this point for yourself, and let not your energy be misapplied. The sūtra distinctly says that we should take refuge in the Buddha within ourselves; it does not suggest that we should take refuge in other buddhas. [Moreover], if we do not take refuge in the buddha within ourselves, there is no other place for us to retreat. (Note: According to Wendi Adamek, "Chan Buddhism was radical in its rejection of the notion of taking refuge in the Three Jewels as outside supports, recommending that the practitioner go straight to her or his own mind.")

==== Three Jewels in one substance ====
Mahāyāna sources may speak of the three refuges according to non-dual interpretations which do not regard them as three separate entities. For example, in the Mahāparinirvāṇa Sūtra, one reads:

Good man, now you should not distinguish among the Three Jewels as śrāvakas and ordinary people do. In the Mahāyāna, there is nothing that marks the three refuges as separate. Why do I say this? Because the dharma and the sangha exist within the buddha-nature itself. It was in order to ferry śrāvakas and ordinary people to the other shore that I separately expounded different marks for each of the three refuges.

The Mahāparinirvāṇa Sūtra also emphasizes that since the Buddha "is permanently abiding and immutable," the Dharma and the Sangha are also permanent. Thus, the sutra affirms that "the Three Jewels all abide permanently." In Chan materials one also finds definitions according to which the three jewels are inseparable in and as mind, or heart (xin), such as when the second patriarch Huike explains, "This Heart is Buddha, this Heart is Dharma; Dharma and Buddha are not two. The jewel of the Sangha is like this too." Likewise, the Tsung Ching Record of Dazhu Huihai states:

Mind is the Buddha and it is needless to use this Buddha to seek the Buddha. Mind is the Dharma and it is needless to use this Dharma to seek the Dharma. Buddha and Dharma are not separate entities and their togetherness forms the Sangha. Such is the meaning of Three Jewels in One Substance. (Note: See also the Baozang lun: "Transcendence is the dharma, subtlety is the buddha, and the harmonious union of the two without duality is called the saṃgha. Therefore, the three names share a single essence, and this single essence has three names. When fused together with no distinction among them, they return to that which is originally nameless." And see also the following from the Wanling Record of Huangbo Xiyun: "The act of seeing is what is called dharma. Seeing the dharma is what is called buddha. Where both buddha and dharma are nonexistent is what is called saṅgha. This is called the unconditioned saṅgha; this is also called the three jewels in their single essence. Now, those who seek the dharma should seek it without attachment to buddha, dharma, or congregation; there should be nothing that they seek. Since you seek without attachment to the buddha, there is no buddha; since you seek without attachment to the dharma, there is no dharma; since you seek without attachment to the congregation, there is no saṅgha.")

=== Refuge in Vajrayana ===
In Tibetan Buddhism there are three refuge formulations, the Outer, Inner, and Secret forms of the Three Jewels. The 'Outer' form is the 'Triple Gem', (Sanskrit: triratna), the 'Inner' is the Three Roots and the 'Secret' form is the 'Three Bodies' or trikaya of a Buddha.

These alternative refuge formulations are employed by those undertaking deity yoga and other tantric practices within the Tibetan Buddhist Vajrayana tradition.

== Recitation in Pali ==
Recitation in Pali
Recitation in Pali for taking refuge

The most used recitation in Pali:

Buddhaṁ saraṇaṁ gacchāmi.
I take refuge in the Buddha.

Dhammaṁ saraṇaṁ gacchāmi.
I take refuge in the Dharma.

Saṅghaṁ saraṇaṁ gacchāmi.
I take refuge in the Saṅgha.

Dutiyampi Buddhaṁ saraṇaṁ gacchāmi.
For the second time, I take refuge in the Buddha.
Dutiyampi Dhammaṁ saraṇaṁ gacchāmi.
For the second time, I take refuge in the Dharma.
Dutiyampi Saṅghaṁ saraṇaṁ gacchāmi.
For the second time, I take refuge in the Saṅgha.

Tatiyampi Buddhaṁ saraṇaṁ gacchāmi.
For the third time, I take refuge in the Buddha.
Tatiyampi Dhammaṁ saraṇaṁ gacchāmi.
For the third time, I take refuge in the Dharma.
Tatiyampi Saṅghaṁ saraṇaṁ gacchāmi.
For the third time, I take refuge in the Saṅgha.

Except this there are various recitations mentioned in Pali literature for taking refuge in the Three Jewels. Brett Shults proposes that Pali texts may employ the Brahmanical motif of a group of three refuges, as found in Rig Veda 9.97.47, Rig Veda 6.46.9 and Chandogya Upanishad 2.22.3-4.

== Precepts ==
Lay followers often undertake five precepts in the same ceremony as they take the refuges. Monks administer the precepts to the laypeople, which creates an additional psychological effect. The five precepts are:

1. not killing;
2. not stealing;
3. not misusing sex;
4. not engaging in false speech;
5. not indulging in intoxicants.

A layperson who upholds the precepts is described in the texts as a "jewel among laymen".

== Triratna symbol ==
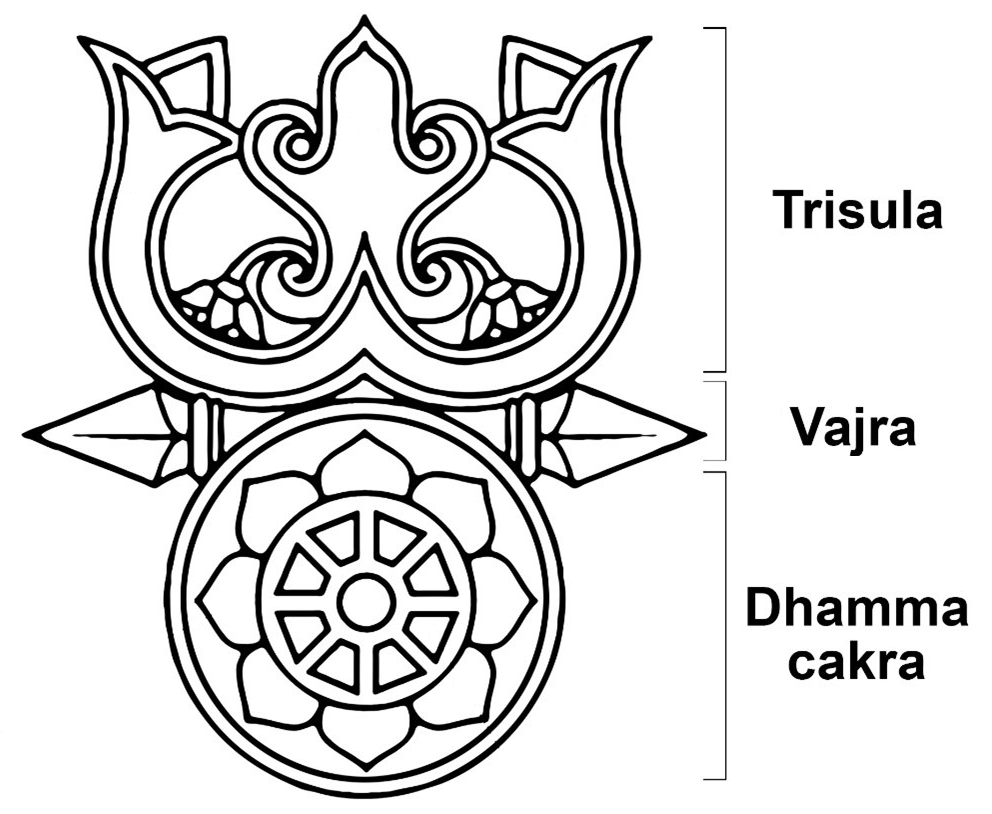
Triratna symbol consisting of Trisula, Vajra, and Dharmacakra.

The Triratna (Pali: ti-ratana or ratana-ttaya; Sanskrit: tri-ratna or ratna-traya) is a Buddhist symbol, thought to visually represent the Three Jewels of Buddhism (the Buddha, the Dhamma, the Sangha).

The Triratna symbol is composed of:

- A lotus flower within a circle.
- A diamond rod, or vajra.
- An ananda-chakra.
- A trident, or trisula, with three branches, representing the threefold jewels of Buddhism: Buddha, the Dhamma and the Sangha.

On representations of the footprint of the Buddha, the Triratna is usually also surmounted by the Dhamma wheel.

The Triratna can be found on frieze sculptures at Sanchi as the symbol crowning a flag standard (2nd century BCE), as a symbol of the Buddha installed on the Buddha's throne (2nd century BCE), as the crowning decorative symbol on the later gates at the stupa in Sanchi (2nd century CE), or, very often on the Buddha footprint (starting from the 1st century CE).

The triratna can be further reinforced by being surmounted with three dharma wheels (one for each of the three jewels of Buddhism: the Buddha, the Dhamma and the Sangha).

The triratna symbol is also called nandipada, or "bull's hoof", by Hindus.

=== Coins ===
A number of examples of the triratna symbol appear on historical coins of Buddhist kingdoms in the Indian subcontinent. For example, the triratna appears on the first century BCE coins of the Kuninda Kingdom. It also surmounts the depictions of stupas, on some the coins of Abdagases I of the Indo-Scythian of the first century CE and on the coins of the Kushan Empire, such as those coined by Vima Kadphises, also of the first century.

=== Gallery ===
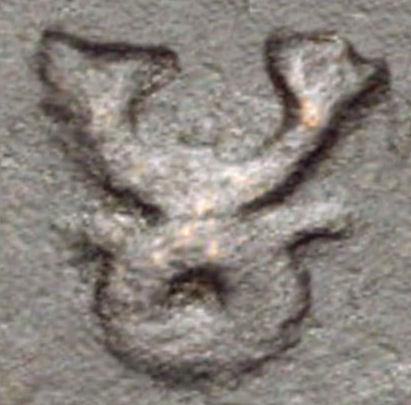
Triratna on a Taxila coin, 185–168 BCE (detail)

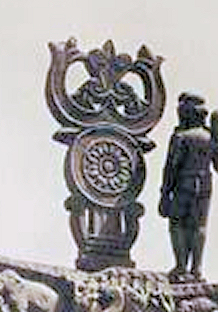
The compound Buddhist symbols: Shrivatsa within a triratana, over a Dharmacakra wheel, on the Torana gate at Sanchi. 1st century BCE

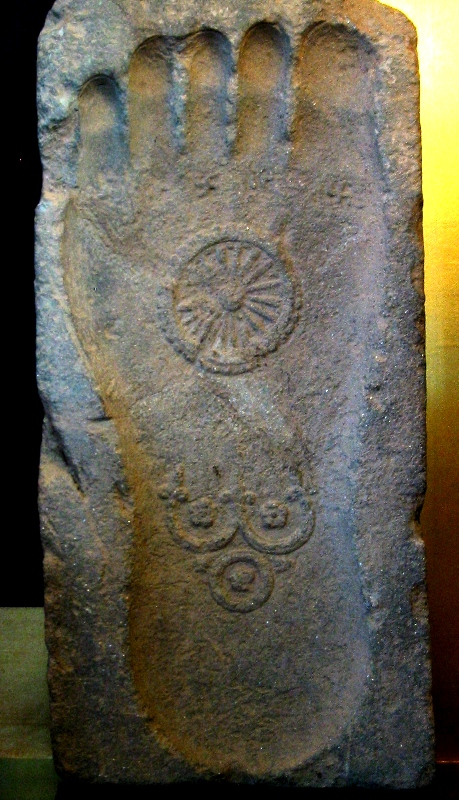
The Triratna or "Three Jewels" symbol, on a Buddha footprint (bottom symbol, the top symbol being a dharmachakra). 1st century CE, Gandhara.

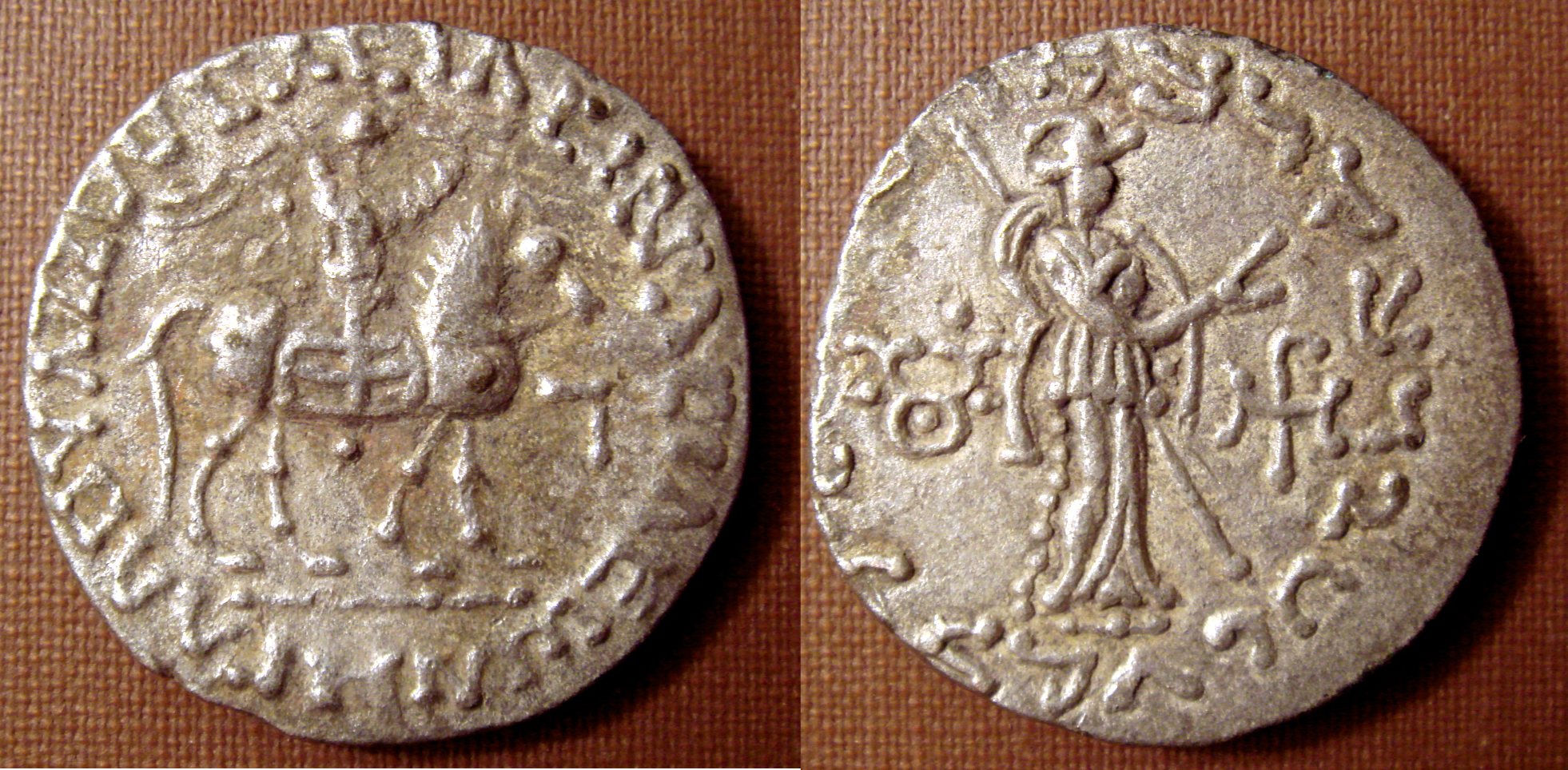
Triratna symbol on the reverse (left field) of a coin of the Indo-Scythian king Azes II (r.c. 35–12 BCE)

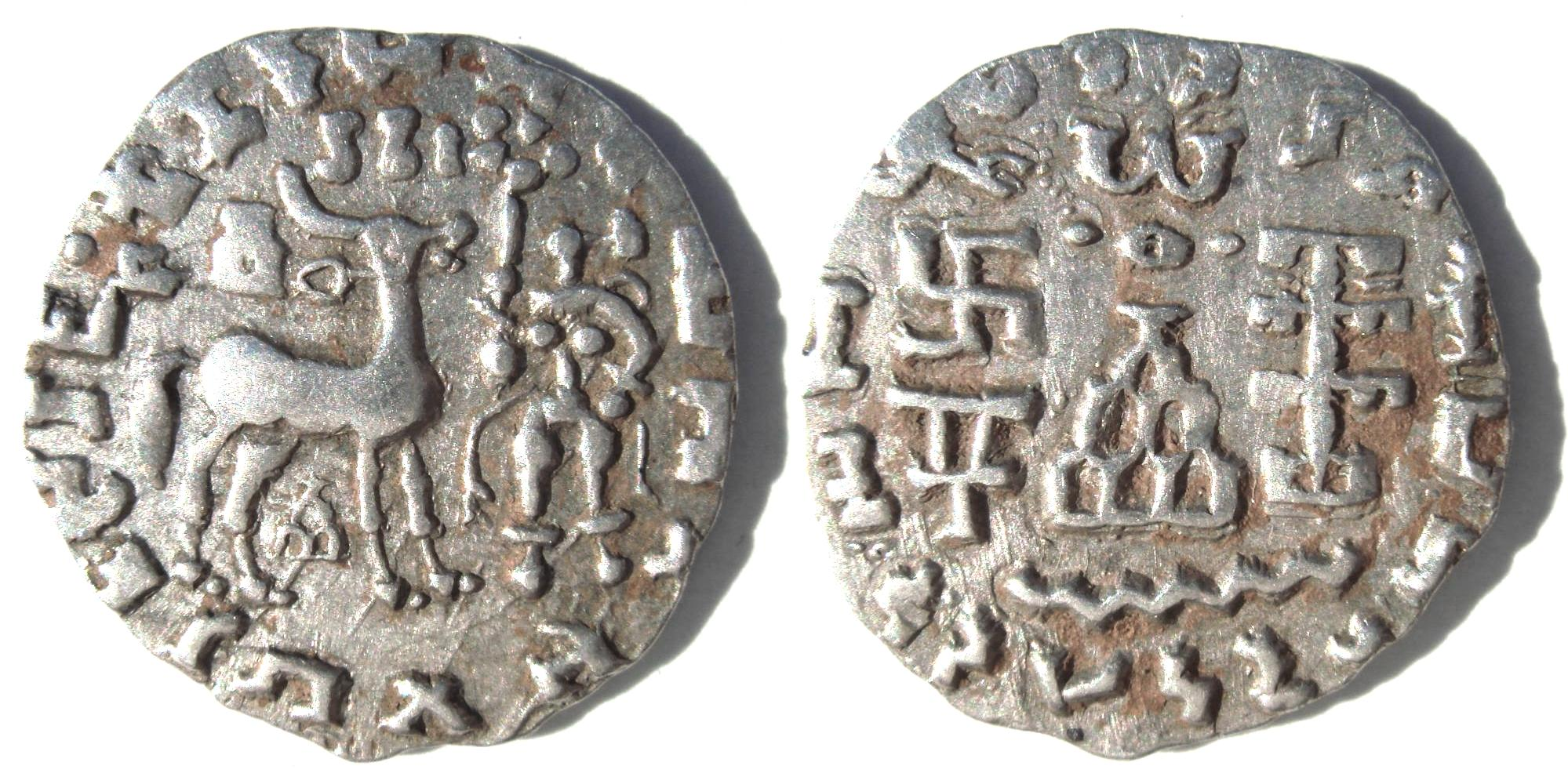
2nd century BCE coin of the Kunindas, incorporating on the reverse the Buddhist triratna symbol on top of a stupa

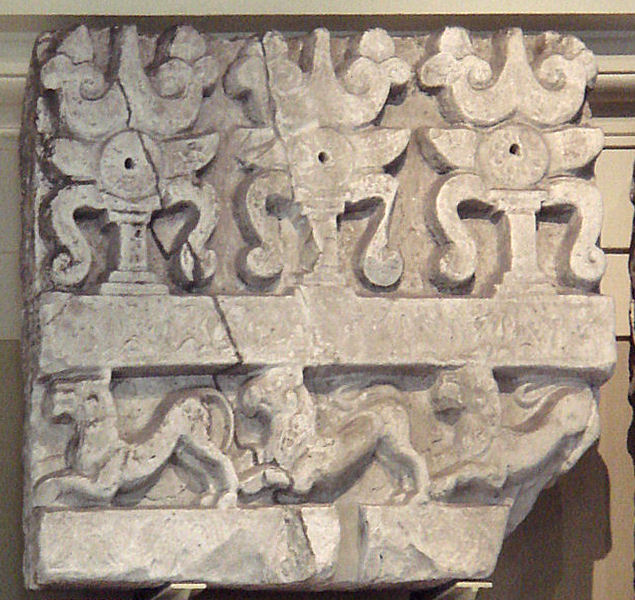
Amaravati Triratna symbols

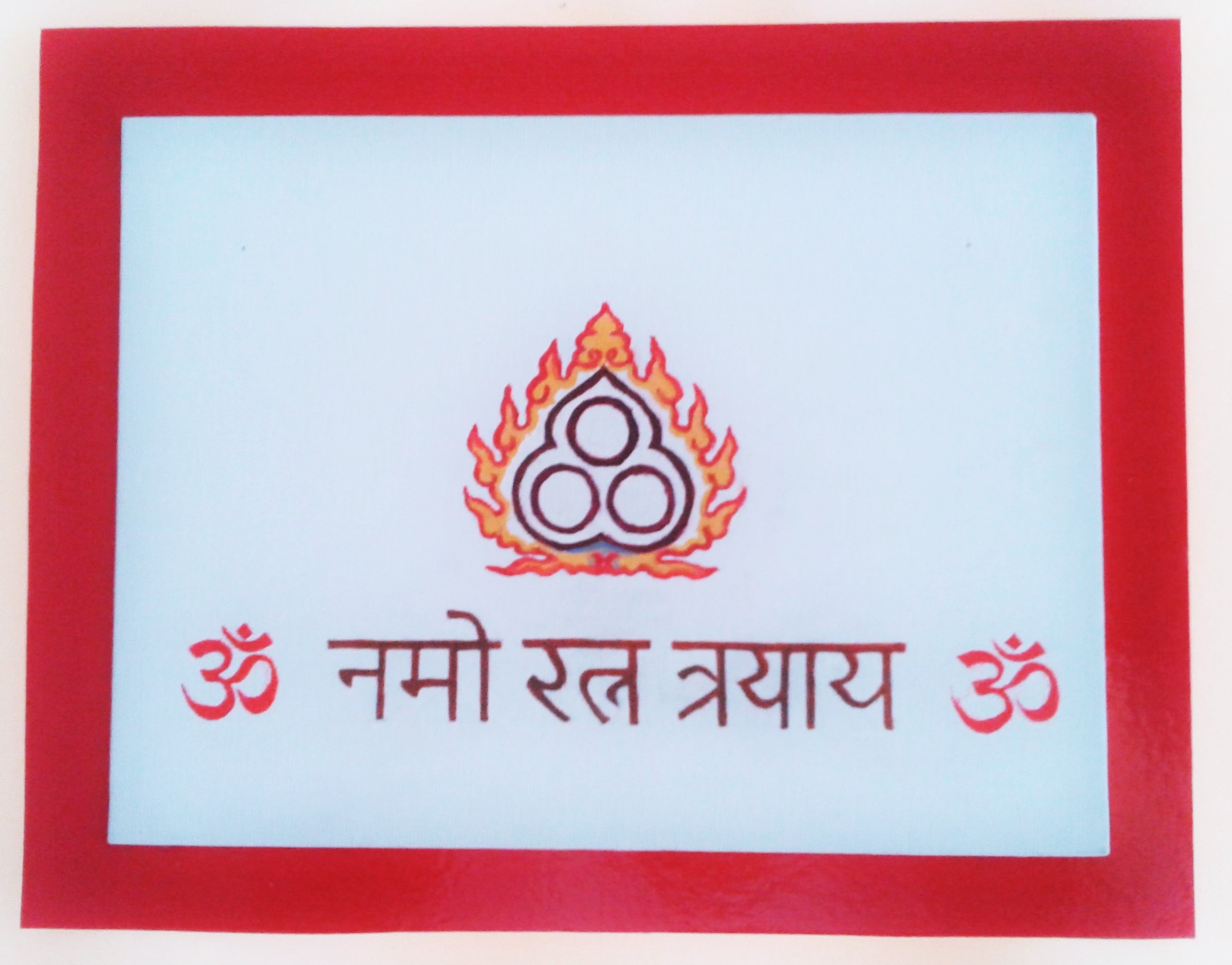
Triratna with the mantra written in devanagari "om namo ratna trayaya om" (Om Praise to the Three Jewels (Triratna) Om). Painting on canvas 18x24.

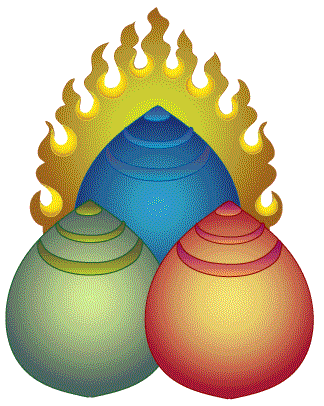
Triratna symbol.

Triratna Symbol SVG Vector Graphic

== See also ==
- Awgatha – Burmese Buddhist prayer
- Abhijñā – Supernormal knowledge in Buddhism
- Anussati – Type of meditational and devotional practices
- Bhāvanā – Concept in Indian religions, signifying contemplation and spiritual cultivation
- Four Noble Truths – Formulaic summary of Buddhist doctrines
- Jingxiang – Ritual of offering incense accompanied by tea and/or fruits
- Pure land – Abode of a buddha or bodhisattva in Mahayana Buddhism
- Tamga – Symbol branding culture of Eurasian nomads
