= Arched-hill symbol =

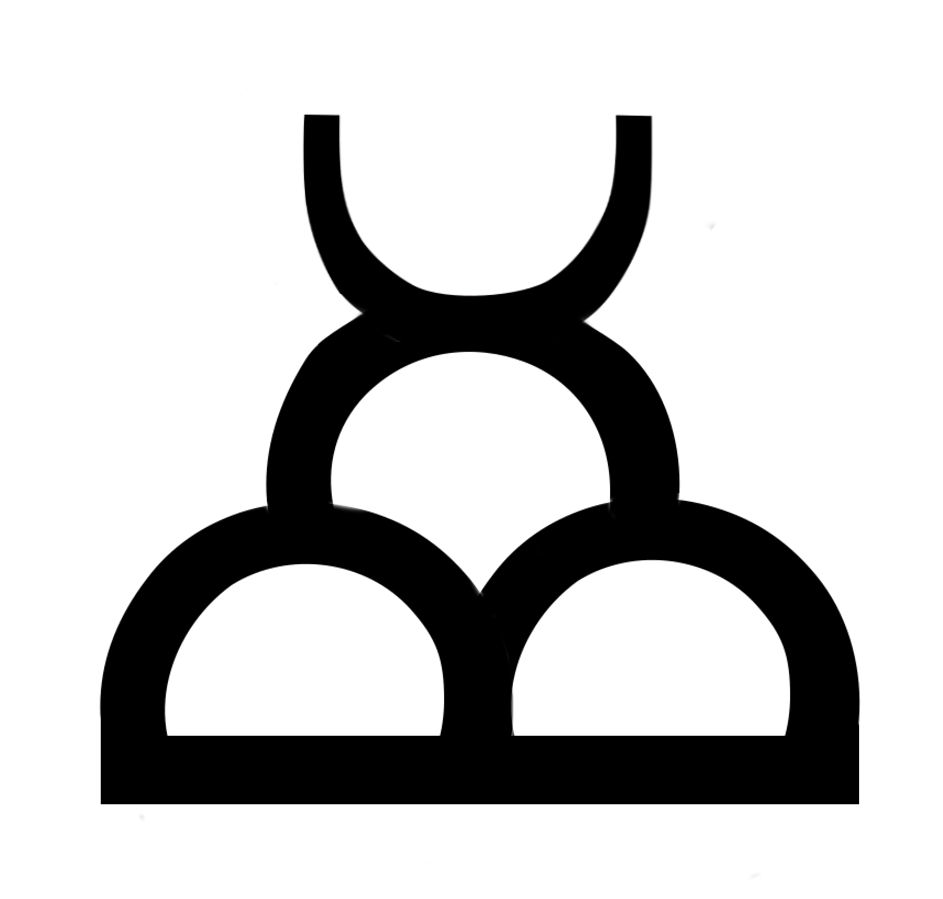
Arched-hill symbol (here a three arched-hill symbol with crescent).

The Arched-hill symbol is a symbol on ancient Coinage of India. There are some variations to the number of the hills depicted, or the symbol surmounting the hill, such as a crescent or a star.

It is thought that the three-arched hill symbol was initiated during the Maurya Empire (3rd–2nd century BCE). Later, in coins from Taxila dated from 220 BCE, the three-arched symbol appears regularly, and from 185 BCE is regularly associated with the animal figures of the elephant and the lion. In contrast, the Nandipada is generally associated with the zebu bull. On coins of the Shunga period, the three-arched hill can appear among a multitude of other symbols, such as the Nandipada, the tree-in-railing, the elephant, or the empty cross.

The symbol is generally considered a representation of a Buddhist Chaitya. It has also been argued that it was the imperial symbol of the Mauryas. The symbol however, appears in many post-Mauryan contexts as seen with the coins of Taxila and the Shungas.

== Gallery ==
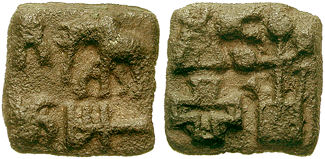
A Sunga coin (150 BCE-100 CE) with three-arched hill (reverse, top left) among other symbols.

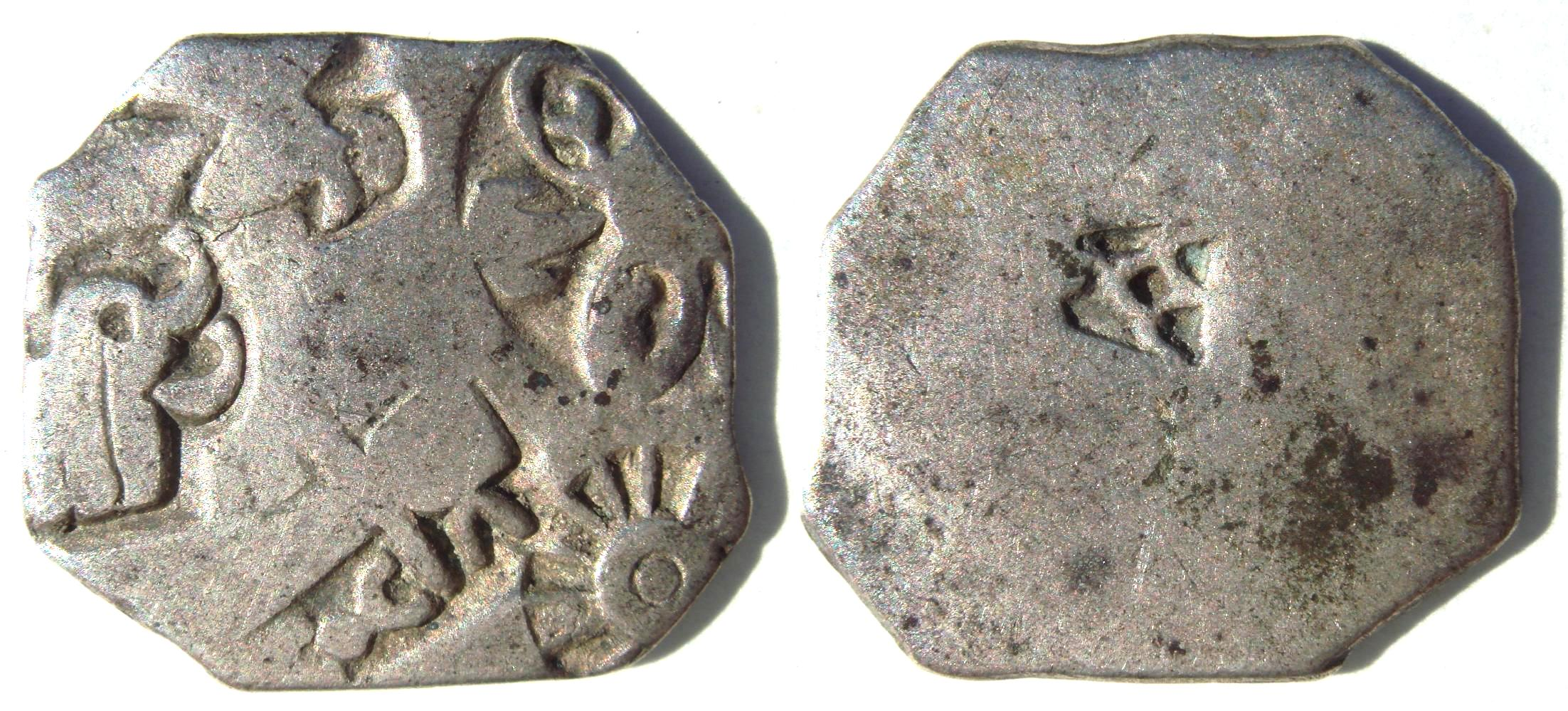
An Arched-hill symbol on the reverse of this Maurya Empire coin.

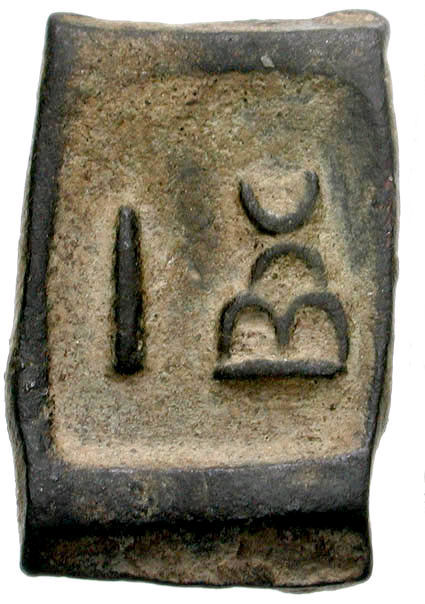
Single-die local coinage of Taxila. Column and arched-hill symbol (220-185 BCE).

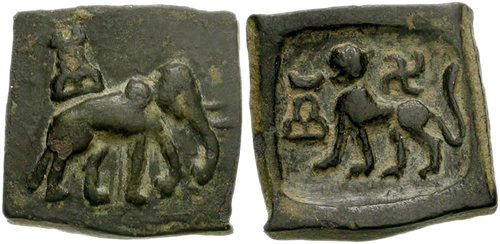
Taxila coin (Post-Maurya, 185-160 BCE).

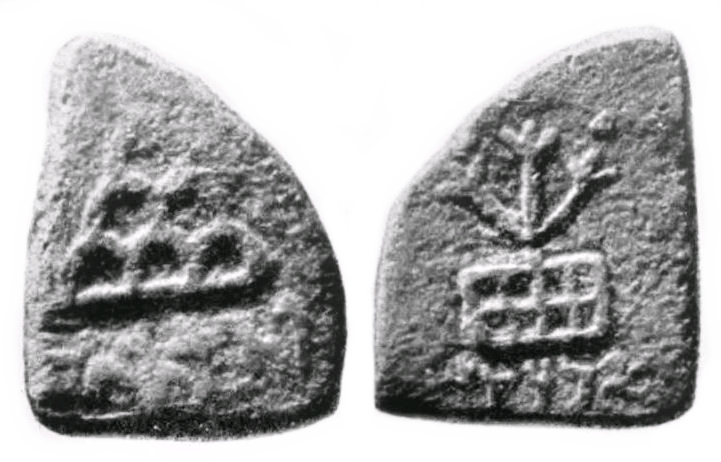
A six-arched hill symbol with star on top, with tree-in-railing on a coin of Indo-Greek king Agathocles.

A six-arched hill symbol on Pope John Paul I coat of arms. Fairly common in other coats of arms in Italy.

== See also ==
- Post-Mauryan coinage of Gandhara
