= Apollodotus I =

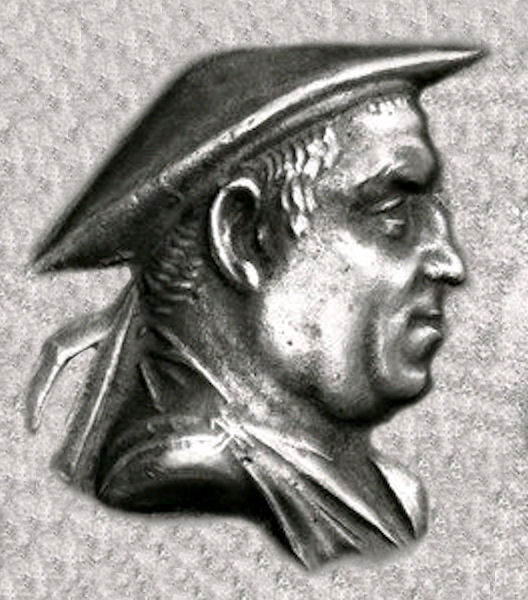
- Portrait of Apollodotus as shown on his coins

Indo-Greek king
- Reign: 180–160 BC or between 174–165 BC
- Predecessor: Agathocles of Bactria
- Successor: Demetrius II of India
- Born: Bactria in Central Asia
- Died: c. 163–162 BC; Ohind near Taxila, India (modern day Pakistan)
- Dynasty: Diodotid or Eucratid

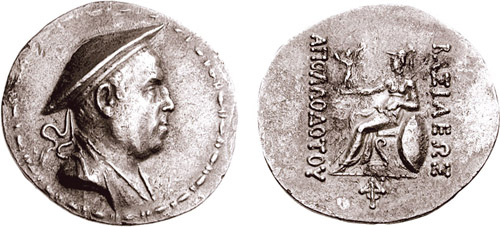
Attic Tetradrachm of Apollodotus I shown wearing a Macedonian kausia hat. The Greek inscription reads ΒΑΣΙΛΕΩΣ ΑΠΟΛΛΟΔΟΤΟΥ, Basileōs Apollodotou, "of King Apollodotus". The reverse shows Athena holding Nike in right hand, spear in left, resting her left elbow on shield.

Apollodotus I Soter (Greek: Ἀπολλόδοτος Α΄ ὁ Σωτήρ, Apollódotos ho Sōtḗr, "Apollodotus the Saviour"), known in Indian sources as Apaladata, was an Indo-Greek king from 180 BC to 160 BC, or between 174 and 165 BC (first dating by Osmund Bopearachchi and R. C. Senior, second dating by Boperachchi) who ruled the western and southern parts of the Indo-Greek kingdom, from Taxila in the Punjab region to the areas of Sindh and possibly Gujarat.

== Ruler of the Indo-Greek kingdom ==
Apollodotus whose name means "given by Apollo", was not the first to strike bilingual coins outside Bactria, but he was the first king who ruled in India only, and therefore the founder of the proper Indo-Greek kingdom. According to W. W. Tarn, Apollodotus I was one of the generals of Demetrius I of Bactria, the Greco-Bactrian king who invaded northwestern India after 180 BC. Tarn was uncertain whether he was a member of the royal house. It is possible he was an illegitimate son of Euthydemus, making him Demetrius’ half brother. Later authors largely agree with Tarn's analysis, though with perhaps even more uncertainty regarding who the king was, for his coins do not give many hints.

Apollodotus likely ruled at the same time as Antimachus I and Antimachus II, or was succeeded in India by Antimachus II. It is also likely that king Antimachus II ruled the more western territories closer to Bactria. Eventually Apollodotus was succeeded by Menander I, and the two kings are mentioned by Pompejus Trogus as important Indo-Greek rulers.

The 1st–2nd century AD Periplus of the Erythraean Sea further testifies to the reign of Apollodotus and the influence of the Indo-Greeks in India:

"To the present day ancient drachmae are current in Barygaza, coming from this country, bearing inscriptions in Greek letters, and the devices of those who reigned after Alexander, Apollodotus [sic] and Menander."

— Periplus Chap. 47.

== Coinage ==
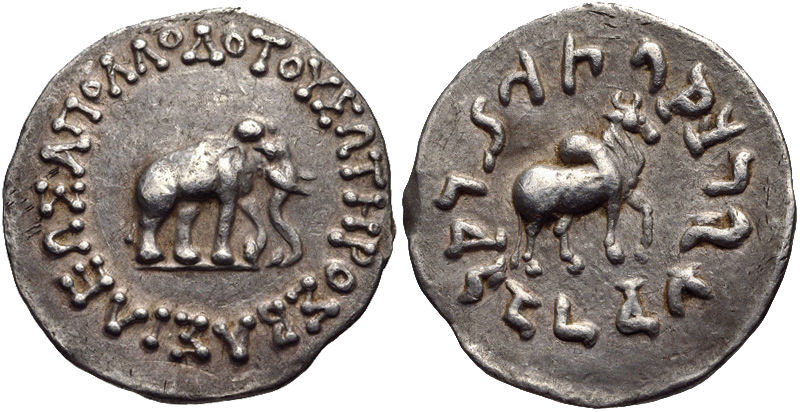
Bilingual drachm of Apollodotus I. The Greek legend on the obverse reads: ΒΑΣΙΛΕΩΣ ΑΠΟΛΛΟΔΟΤΟΥ ΣΩΤΗΡΟΣ, Basileōs Apollodotou Sōtēros, "of Saviour King Apollodotus". The Kharosthi legend on the reverse reads: Maharajasa Apaladatasa Tratarasa, "Of Great Saviour King Apollodotus".

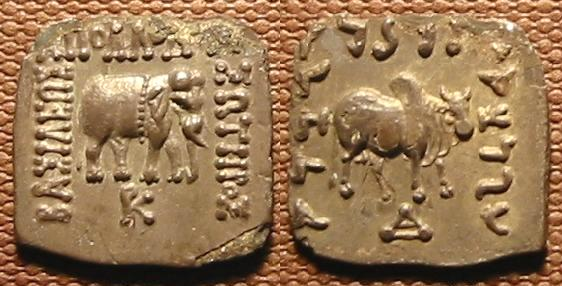
Indian-standard coin of Apollodotus I. The obverse shows the sacred elephant with decorative belt and Greek legend: ΒΑΣΙΛΕΩΣ ΑΠΟΛΛΟΔΟΤΟΥ ΣΩΤΗΡΟΣ, "of Saviour King Apollodotus". The reverse shows a Zebu bull with Kharosthi legend: 𐨨𐨱𐨪𐨗𐨯 𐨀𐨤𐨫𐨡𐨟𐨯 𐨟𐨿𐨪𐨟𐨪𐨯, Maharajasa Apaladatasa Tratarasa, "of Great Saviour King Apollodotus". Actual size: 15 mm, 1.4 grams.

The coinage of Apollodotus is, together with that of Menander, one of the most abundant of the Indo-Greek kings. It is found mainly in the provinces of Punjab, Sindh and Gujarat, indicating the southern limit of the Indo-Greek expansion in India. This is also suggested by the Periplus, a 1st-century AD document on trade in the Indian Ocean, which describes the remnants of Greek presence (shrines, barracks, wells, coinage) in the strategic port of Barygaza (Bharuch) in Gujarat. Strabo (XI) also describes the occupation of Patalene (Indus Delta country). While Sindh may have come under his possession, it is not known whether Apollodotus advanced to Gujarat, where the Satavahanas ruled.

Apollodotus also issued a great number of bilingual Indian-standard square coins. Besides the usual royal title, the exact significance of the animals depicted on the coins is unclear. The sacred elephant may be the symbol of the city of Taxila, or possibly the symbol of the white elephant who reputedly entered the womb of the mother of the Buddha, Queen Maya, in a dream, which would make it a symbol of Buddhism, one of the main religions of the Indo-Greek territories.

Similarly, the sacred bull on the reverse may be a symbol of a city (Pushkhalavati), or a depiction of Shiva, making it a symbol of Hinduism, the other major religion at that time. The bull is often represented in a clearly erectile state, which reinforces its interpretation as a representation of Shiva. Conversely, this also reinforces the interpretation of the elephant as a religious symbol. Alternatively, the Bull, according to Foucher, represents the birth of the Buddha, as it happened during the month of Vaicakha (April–May), known to Buddhists as Vesak, under the zodiacal sign of the Taurus, during the full moon. The enlightenment and passing of the Buddha also occurred during the Taurus full moon.

=== Buddhist and Hindu symbolism ===
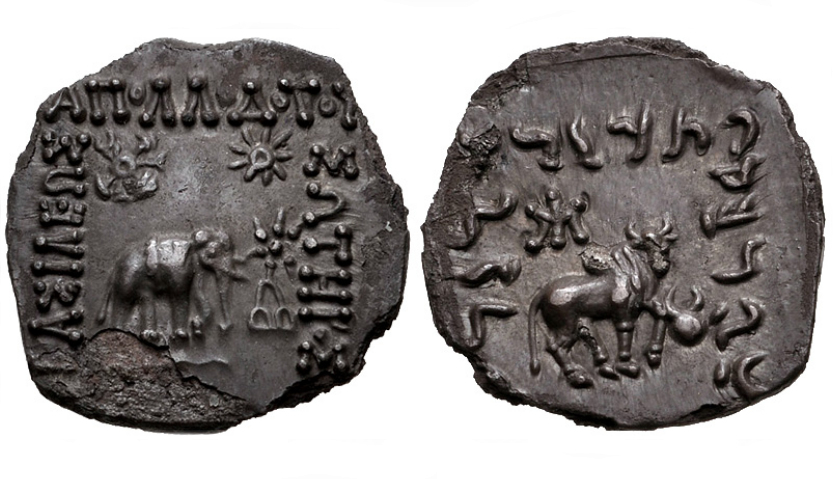
The first Indian coins of Apollodotus showed symbols and depicted animals. These coins associated the elephant with the Buddhist Chaitya or arched-hill symbol, sun symbols, six-armed symbol, and a river. The bull had a Nandipada in front.

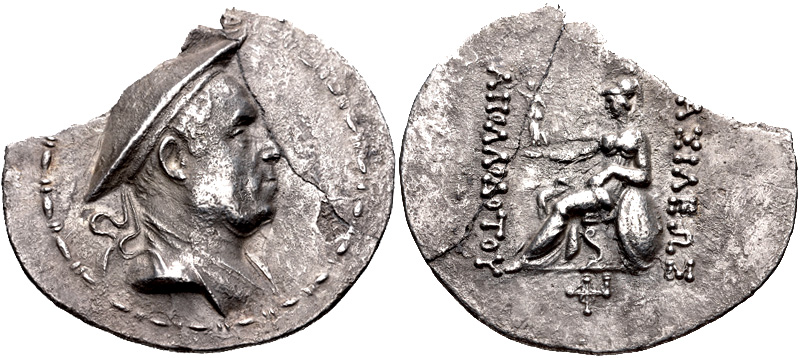
A damaged Attic tetradrachm of Apollodotus I, shown wearing a Macedonian kausia hat and a diadem. The reverse shows seated Athena holding Nike, and resting elbow on shield. This coin was found in the ruins of Ai-Khanoum, a Greek city in Bactria.

Before their design was eventually simplified, some of the earlier coins of king Apollodotus directly associate the elephant with Buddhist symbolism, such as the stupa hill (arched-hill symbol) surmounted by a crescent or a star (the Chaitya symbol), also seen, for example on the coins of the Mauryan Empire, many local coins of Taxila or those of the later Kuninda kingdom.

Also the zebu bull on the reverse is often shown with a nandipada taurine mark on its hump on the less-worn coins, which reinforces the role of the animal as a symbol, religious or geographic, rather than just the depiction of an animal for decorative purposes. The nandipada and the zebu bull are generally associated with Nandi, Shiva's humped bull in Hinduism. The same association was made later on coins of Zeionises or Vima Kadphises. The elephant, pendant to the bull, and shown with a girdle on the obverse, also must have a symbolic role, possibly Buddhism, as it was associated with the stupa hill in the earliest coins of Apollodotus.

Apollodotus experimented with different coin standards for his silver, until he settled for a standard lighter than the Attic which would prevail for centuries, though later rulers usually struck round coins instead of the square (typically Indian) shape of most of Apollodotus' silver. He issued a number of bronzes with Apollo/tripod, that also were repeated for centuries.

=== Bactrian coins ===
Apollodotus also issued a small series of monolingual Attic tetradrachms, intended for export into Bactria. For these, Apollodotus I clearly used Bactrian celators to strike a realistic portrait of the king as an aged man in the Macedonian Greek hat called kausia, with a reverse of sitting Pallas Athene holding Nike, a common Hellenistic motif introduced by the Diadoch Lysimachus. On these coins, he used no epithet.

== See also ==
- Greco-Bactrian Kingdom
- Seleucid Empire
- Greco-Buddhism
- Indo-Scythians
- Indo-Parthian Kingdom
- Kushan Empire

== Sources ==
- Tarn, William Woodthorpe. The Greeks in Bactria and India. Cambridge University Press, 1938.

Preceded by Agathocles (in Paropamisade)	Greco-Bactrian king (in Paropamisade, Arachosia, Gandhara, Punjab); 180–160 BC	Succeeded by Antimachus II
Preceded by Pantaleon (in Gandhara)	Greco-Bactrian king (in Paropamisade, Arachosia, Gandhara, Punjab); 180–160 BC	Succeeded by Antimachus II

	Greco-Bactrian kings		Indo-Greek kings					
Territories/ dates	West Bactria	East Bactria	Paropamisade	Arachosia	Gandhara	Western Punjab	Eastern Punjab	Mathura
326-325 BCE	Campaigns of Alexander the Great in India						Nanda Empire	
312 BCE	Creation of the Seleucid Empire						Creation of the Maurya Empire	
305 BCE	Seleucid Empire after Mauryan war		Maurya Empire					
280 BCE	Foundation of Ai-Khanoum							
255–239 BCE	Independence of the Greco-Bactrian kingdom Diodotus I		Emperor Ashoka (268-232 BCE)					
239–223 BCE	Diodotus II							
230–200 BCE	Euthydemus I							
200–190 BCE	Demetrius I				Sunga Empire			
190-185 BCE	Euthydemus II							
190–180 BCE	Agathocles			Pantaleon				
185–170 BCE	Antimachus I							
180–160 BCE			Apollodotus I					
175–170 BCE	Demetrius II							
160–155 BCE			Antimachus II					
170–145 BCE	Eucratides I							
155–130 BCE	Yuezhi occupation, loss of Ai-Khanoum	Eucratides II; Plato; Heliocles I	Menander I					
130–120 BCE	Yuezhi occupation		Zoilus I		Agathoclea			Yavanarajya inscription
120–110 BCE			Lysias		Strato I			Yavanarajya inscription
110–100 BCE			Antialcidas		Heliocles II			Yavanarajya inscription
100 BCE			Polyxenus		Demetrius III			Yavanarajya inscription
100–95 BCE			Philoxenus					Yavanarajya inscription
95–90 BCE			Diomedes	Amyntas		Epander		Yavanarajya inscription
90 BCE			Theophilus	Peucolaus		Thraso		Yavanarajya inscription
90–85 BCE			Nicias	Menander II		Artemidorus		Yavanarajya inscription
90–70 BCE			Hermaeus	Archebius				Yavanarajya inscription
			Yuezhi occupation		Maues (Indo-Scythian)			
75–70 BCE				Vonones	Telephus	Apollodotus II		
65–55 BCE				Spalirises		Hippostratus	Dionysius	
55–35 BCE					Azes I (Indo-Scythians)		Zoilus II	
55–35 BCE					Vijayamitra/ Azilises		Apollophanes	
25 BCE – 10 CE				Gondophares	Zeionises	Kharahostes	Strato II; Strato III	
				Gondophares (Indo-Parthian)			Rajuvula (Indo-Scythian)	
			Kujula Kadphises (Kushan Empire)				Bhadayasa (Indo-Scythian)	Sodasa (Indo-Scythian)
