= Pantaleon =

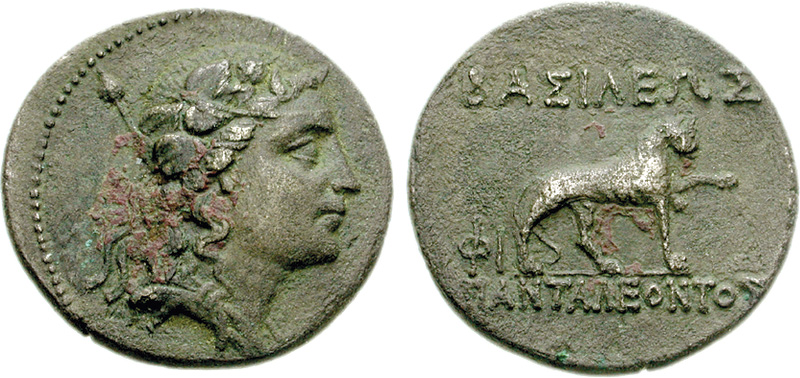
- Cupro-nickel coin of Pantaleon. Greek legend reads: BAΣIΛEΩΣ ΠANTAΛEONTOΣ, "of king Pantaleon."

Indo-Greek king
- Reign: 190–180 BC
- Predecessor: Demetrius I
- Successor: Agathocles
- Died: 180 BCE
- Dynasty: Euthydemid dynasty
- Father: Euthydemus I

Pantaleon (Ancient Greek: Πανταλέων, Pantaléōn) was a Greek king who reigned some time between 190 and 180 BC in Bactria and India. He was a younger contemporary or successor of the Greco-Bactrian king Demetrius, and is sometimes believed to have been his brother and/or subking.

The scarcity of his coinage indicates a short reign. Known evidence suggests that he was replaced by his (probable) brother or son Agathocles, by whom he was commemorated on a "pedigree" coin.

== Copper-nickel coinage ==
Some of his coins (as well as those of Agathocles and Euthydemus II) have another surprising characteristic: they are made of copper-nickel alloy, a technology that would not be developed in the West until the 18th century (some 1,890 years later), but was known by the Chinese at the time. This suggests that exchanges of the metallic alloy or technicians happened between China and the region of Bactria.

== Bilingual Indian-standard coinage ==
He was the first Greek king to strike Indian coins, peculiar irregular bronzes representing a lion with a dancing Indian woman, probably the goddess Lakshmi (a type also known in the Post-Mauryan coinage of Gandhara), which suggests he had his base in Arachosia and Gandhara and wanted support from the native population.

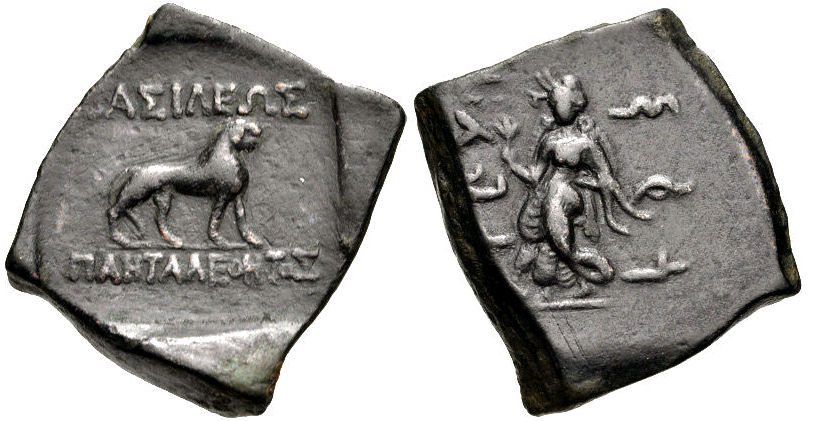
Indian square coin of King Pantaleon with the obverse showing a leopard. The reverse showing a dancing woman (perhaps a Lakshmi). Brahmi legend reads: Rajane Patalevasa ("King Pantaleon").

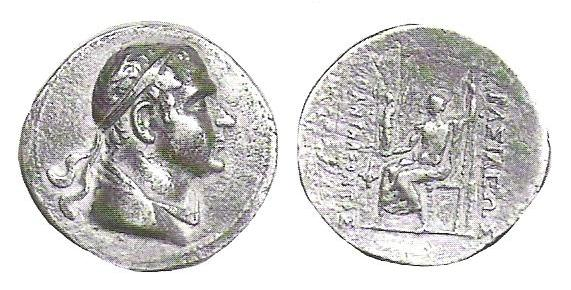
Silver coin of King Pantaleon. The obverse shows the King's portrait wearing a royal diadem. The reverse shows seated Zeus holding goddess Hecate. Greek legend reads: BAΣIΛEΩΣ ΠANTAΛEONTOΣ, Basileōs Pantaleontos, "Of King Pantaleon."

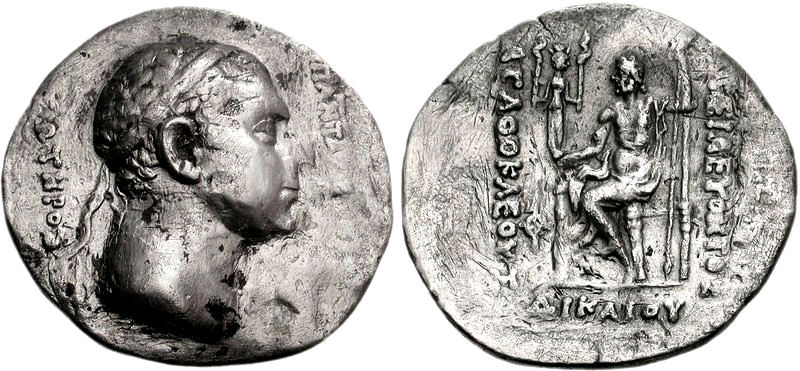
Agathocles' commemorative coin for Pantaleon. The obverse shows the portrait of Pantaleon, and the Greek legend: ΠΑΝΤΑΛΕΟΝΤΟΣ ΣΩΤΗΡΟΣ, Pantaleontos Sōtēros, "Of Pantaleon the Saviour". The reverse shows seated Zeus holding goddess Hecate, and with Greek legend: ΒΑΣΙΛΕΥΟΝΤΟΣ ΔΙΚΑΙΟΥ ΑΓΑΘΟΚΛΕΟΥΣ, Basileuontos Dikaiou Agathokleous, "Of Agathocles the Just, ruling as King".

Preceded by Demetrius I	Indo-Greek Ruler (Arachosia, Gandhara); 190–185 BCE	Succeeded by Apollodotus I

	Greco-Bactrian kings		Indo-Greek kings					
Territories/ dates	West Bactria	East Bactria	Paropamisade	Arachosia	Gandhara	Western Punjab	Eastern Punjab	Mathura
326-325 BCE	Campaigns of Alexander the Great in India						Nanda Empire	
312 BCE	Creation of the Seleucid Empire						Creation of the Maurya Empire	
305 BCE	Seleucid Empire after Mauryan war		Maurya Empire					
280 BCE	Foundation of Ai-Khanoum							
255–239 BCE	Independence of the Greco-Bactrian kingdom Diodotus I		Emperor Ashoka (268-232 BCE)					
239–223 BCE	Diodotus II							
230–200 BCE	Euthydemus I							
200–190 BCE	Demetrius I				Sunga Empire			
190-185 BCE	Euthydemus II							
190–180 BCE	Agathocles			Pantaleon				
185–170 BCE	Antimachus I							
180–160 BCE			Apollodotus I					
175–170 BCE	Demetrius II							
160–155 BCE			Antimachus II					
170–145 BCE	Eucratides I							
155–130 BCE	Yuezhi occupation, loss of Ai-Khanoum	Eucratides II; Plato; Heliocles I	Menander I					
130–120 BCE	Yuezhi occupation		Zoilus I		Agathoclea			Yavanarajya inscription
120–110 BCE			Lysias		Strato I			Yavanarajya inscription
110–100 BCE			Antialcidas		Heliocles II			Yavanarajya inscription
100 BCE			Polyxenus		Demetrius III			Yavanarajya inscription
100–95 BCE			Philoxenus					Yavanarajya inscription
95–90 BCE			Diomedes	Amyntas		Epander		Yavanarajya inscription
90 BCE			Theophilus	Peucolaus		Thraso		Yavanarajya inscription
90–85 BCE			Nicias	Menander II		Artemidorus		Yavanarajya inscription
90–70 BCE			Hermaeus	Archebius				Yavanarajya inscription
			Yuezhi occupation		Maues (Indo-Scythian)			
75–70 BCE				Vonones	Telephus	Apollodotus II		
65–55 BCE				Spalirises		Hippostratus	Dionysius	
55–35 BCE					Azes I (Indo-Scythians)		Zoilus II	
55–35 BCE					Vijayamitra/ Azilises		Apollophanes	
25 BCE – 10 CE				Gondophares	Zeionises	Kharahostes	Strato II; Strato III	
				Gondophares (Indo-Parthian)			Rajuvula (Indo-Scythian)	
			Kujula Kadphises (Kushan Empire)				Bhadayasa (Indo-Scythian)	Sodasa (Indo-Scythian)
