= Nandipada =

Ancient Indian symbol

Nandipada.

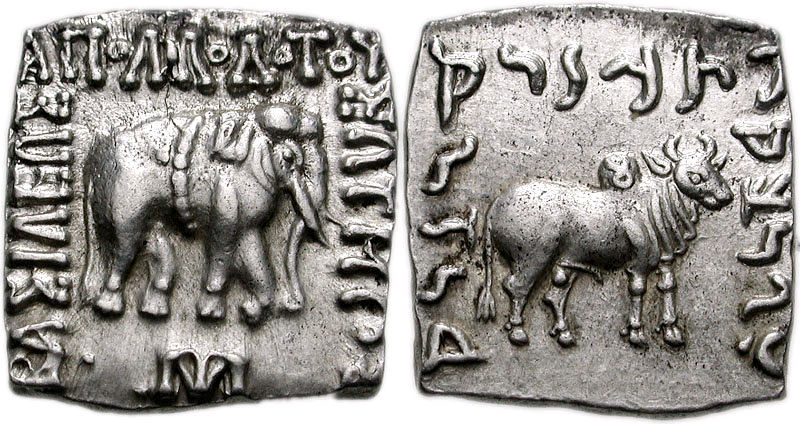
Indian coin of Apollodotus I, with a Nandipada taurine symbol on the hump of the zebu bull.

The Nandipada (lit. 'foot of Nandi') is an ancient Indian symbol, also called a taurine symbol, representing a bull's hoof or the mark left by the foot of a bull in the ground. The nandipada and the zebu bull are generally associated with Nandi, Shiva 's humped bull in Hinduism. The Nandipada symbol also happens to be similar to the Brahmi letter "ma".

The Nandipada appears on numerous ancient Indian coins, such as coins from Taxila dating to the 2nd century BCE. The symbol also appears on the zebu bull on the reverse if often shown with a Nandipada taurine mark on its hump on the less worn coins, which reinforces the role of the animal as a symbol, religious or geographic, rather than just the depiction of an animal for decorative purposes. The same association was made later on coins of Zeionises or Vima Kadphises.
