= Veluri Venkata Krishna Sastry =

Indian archaeologist (1934–2012)

- Born: 23 October 1934; Chirivada, Krishna District, AP, India
- Died: 21 August 2012 (aged 77); Hyderabad, Telangana, India
- Known for: Archeologist

Veluri Venkata Krishna Sastry (23 October 1934 – 21 August 2012) was an archaeologist and historian in Andhra Pradesh, India.

== Early life ==
Krishna Sastry was born on 23 October 1934, Chirivada, Krishna District, Andhra Pradesh, India to Veluri Partha Sarathi and Veluri Anasuya. He graduated from Gudivada College in Krishna District, Andhra Pradesh, and received his master's degree from Osmania University, Hyderabad, Andhra Pradesh, India. He received his PhD from Karnataka University, Dharvar, Karnataka, India.

Sastry's name is associated with almost all the developments and achievements in the archaeology of Andhra Pradesh that happened from the 1970s to the 1990s. He is credited with the identification of a large number of prehistoric, historic and Buddhist sites in Andhra Pradesh. He is also considered the grandfather of Nizam-Telangana History or Nizam-Telangana Charithra Pitamahudu. He is remembered for his scholarly works on Telugu history, both in his birth state of Andhra Pradesh and Telangana State. The man was a legend for his unmatchable contributions to the history of Telangana and Andhra Pradesh.

Sastry wrote over one-hundred papers in numerous research journals, and has also published ten books in his field.

A festschrift in his honour was edited by P. Chenna Reddy.

== Career as an archaeologist ==
Sastry started his career as a scholar trainee at Nagarjunakonda with the Archaeological Survey of India, in 1959. 1961–68 he worked as a technical assistant for the State Department of Archaeology and Museums, Andhra Pradesh. 1968–79 Sastry worked as assistant director of archaeological excavations at the Department of Archaeology and Museums and as chief technical officer at the Department of Archaeology and Museums, from 1979–81. From 1981–92 he worked as director of the Department of Archaeology and Museums. From 1989 to 1991 he also officiated as director of State Archives and Oriental Manuscripts Library.

Sastry unraveled the mysteries in some of the most important Buddhist sites at Chandavaram in Prakasam District, Kesanapalli in Guntur district, Dhulikatta and Kotilingala in Karimnagar district. Sastry proved through his excavation that Keesaragutta in Medchal Taluq of Rangareddy District was ruled by Chalukyas during the post-Satavahana times of 4th–5th centuries AD. The Buddhist sites excavated by Sastry on the hilltops of Totlakonda and Bavikonda are now developed as tourist centers by the Indian Government.

Some of the ancient temples once situated in the submerged area of Srisailam have been reconstructed in the newly built villages Somasila, Erladinne, Siddheswaram, Bhujangeswaram, and Kyatur. They stand as testimonies to the planning and execution skills of Sastry.

Sastry's efforts in establishing museums resulted in the construction and opening up of district museums at Anantapur, Warangal, Nalgonda, Kurnool and the site museums at Chandavaram. The district museum of Nalgonda built adjacent to Pachchala Someswara temple at Panugal has now grown to be an important tourist attraction.

=== Excavations participated or independently conducted ===
- Nagarjunakonda, a site of multiple cultures starting from Prehistory to Medieval times. Primarily a major Buddhist Site (3rd Century AD), 1959–61. Joined as Trainee – Scholar
- Yeleswaram, a Pre and Proto-Historic Megalithic and Early Historical and Medieval site (8th century BC to 13th century AD), 1961–65.
- Kesanapally, an important Buddhist stupa datable to 2nd century BC., 1966. Discovered and excavated
- Peddabankur, a major Satavahana site datable from 2nd century BC. Excavations revealed a number of structures and scores of minor antiquities, 1967–73.
- Motupally, an ancient sea port town of the Kakatiya and Chola periods corresponding to the 11th to 13th centuries AD. 1972–74.
- Kadambapur, Iron Age burial site (8th century BC to 6th century BC), 1973–74. Discovered and Excavated
- Dhulikatta, and Satavahana fortification, habitation site and Buddhist Stupa (2nd century BC to 2nd century AD), 1974–77. Discovered and Excavated
- Polakonda, Iron Age burial site (8th century BC to 6th century BC), 1975–76. Discovered and Excavated
- Agiripalli, a Megalithic Burial site (6th century to 4th century BC), 1976.
- Kesaragutta, a Vishnukundin single period site, which revealed a large number a brick structures, coins, beads, stucco objects etc. (4th century AD), 1976–80.
- Kotilingala, an Mauryan – Satavahana site (2nd century BC to 2nd century AD), 1979–84. Discovered the site containing Satavahana culture including the Buddhist Stupa and Excavated
- Peddamarur, Iron Age burial site, 1978–79. Excavated
- Chinnamarur, Iron Age burial site, Excavated 1979–82.
- Hulikal, a Proto-historic Chalolithic site (1200 BC to 1000 BC), Excavated 1978.
- Bavikonda, an extensive Buddhist site datable from 2nd century BC to 2nd century AD, 1983–87. Excavated
- Thotlakonda, a Buddhist site with several Buddhist stupas, viharas datable from 1st century BC to 5th century AD, 1988 (excavations are in progress), Excavated and published report
- Nelakondapalli, a Buddhist stupa and a very extensive early historical habitation site (3rd century to 5th century AD), 1984–90. Excavated

=== Discoveries ===
- Discovered Stone Age Sites Early Stone Age site at Nagarjunakonda in Guntur District, Amarabad, Chandravagu, in Mehboobnagar District Several prehistoric sites near Ramagundam, Godavary Khani, Early, Middle and Late Stone age sites in Adilabad District near Wankhidi, Pochchara, Kerimeri etc., several Prehistoric sites in and around Yelleswaram in Nalgonda District
- Neolithic sites near Togarrai, Kadambapur, Budigapalli, Kolakonda, Devaruppula, and Polakonda in Karimnagar District
- Megalithic burial sites near Kadambapur, Valigonda in Nalgonda District, Kolakonda in Warangal District, Chinna Torruru, Bommera, Ramunipatla, Timmannapalli, Chilpur, Sirisapalli, Mandapalli, Palamakula, Pullur, and Vargas in Medak District
- Buddhist Stupas at Kesanapalli in Guntur District, Chandavaram in Prakasam District, Dhulikatta, Kotilingala, Poshigoan in Karimnagar District
- Prehistoric rocks art sites at Regonda in Karimnagar District, Edithanur in Medak District, Durgam and Bollaram in Mahbubnagar District, Gargeyapuram in Kurnool District???.

=== Salvage archaeology ===
Under Salvage archaeological operations in the submergible area of the Srisailam Project a large number of ancient temples have been dismantled and reconstructed at higher altitudes. The Somasila Group of Temples, the temples of Siddheswaram, Bhujangeswaram were transplanted and reconstructed. The fourteen temple group of Somasila was dismantled bit by bit and reconstructed at the newly built Somasila village that it now stands aloft in the new Somasila village due to the unceasing efforts of Sastry.

=== Professional achievements ===
Sastry retired as Director, Department of Archaeology and Museums, Andhra Pradesh, India. He was Sectional President for the Indian History Congress held at Kolkatta. He was Sectional President and later General President for Andhra Pradesh History Congress. He was General President for the South Indian Numismatic Conference held at Cochin.

He is a Member on the Salarjung Museum Board, Member of the Heritage Conservation Committee of the Hyderabad Urban Development Authority, Chief Compiler in the Telugu Encyclopedia Revision committee of the Telugu University. He is also the President of the Historical Society of Hyderabad.

=== Awards ===
In 2002 Sastry received the Eminent Citizen Award as an "Outstanding Archaeologist" by the Sanatana Dharma Charitable Trust, Hyderabad.

He was awarded the Title of "Esasvi" by the Helapuri Fort Group Eluru, West Godavary, Andhra Pradesh.

== Publications ==
Sastry's book "Proto Historical Cultures of Andhra Pradesh" was published in 1982.

His book in Telugu entitled "Bharatiya Samskruti Puratatva Parisodhanalu" written as a dialogue between grandfather and grandson described by a journal as the ‘Puratatvopanishad’ was received exceedingly well by the scholarly world.

=== Books ===
- New Satavahana Sculptures from Andhra Amaravati, 1990
- Proto and Early Historical Cultures of Andhra Pradesh Published by the. Govt. of Andhra Pradesh (1983)
- Select Monuments of Hyderabad (1983), a Guide Book.
- Recent Sculptures of Andhra Amarvati (1981)
- Roman Gold Coins Recent Discoveries
- Three Grants of Pruthvisri Mula Raja from Kondavidu.
- Totlakonda – A Buddhist Site in Andhra Pradesh
- Vijayanagara Mahasaamrajyamu Published by National Book Trust
- Bharatiya Samskruti Puratatvaparisodhanalu (Telugu)
- Famines in India through the Ages
- A Brief History of Andhra Pradesh
- History Of Buddhism in Andhra Pradesh
- Status of Women in Vedic Times

=== Research articles published ===
- Terracotta's from Peddabankur and Dhulikatta, (1978) Andhra Pradesh Journal of Archaeology, Vol 1, and no.1.
- Keesara, part of Vishnukundina empire, (1979) Andhra Pradesh Journal of Archaeology, Vol. 1 no. 1
- The Ash mound excavation at Hulikallu (1979) Andhra Pradesh Journal of Archaeology, Vol. 1 no. 2
- Recent archaeological discoveries of the Satavahana period in AP,) Satavahana Souvenir, Satavahana Seminar Special Issue. 1981
- Ancient Andhra History @Archaeology (Sectional Presidential Address) Proceedings of the AP History Congress, 8th Session, Kakinada, 1984
- Vandalism of Archaeological monuments in India – role of public in their preservation, (1985) preservation, (1985) Proceedings of All India Museums Conference, Bhuvaneswar.
- Historical Mosques of Hyderabad (1987) Journal of Salar Jung Museum Annual Research Journal, 1983–84 Hyderabad.
- Architectural affiliation of Andhra with rock-cut caves of Ellora, (1988) Proceedings of Indian Art History Seminar.
- Kuchipudi dance – a historical sketch, (1988) Souvenir of the Kuchipudi Kalaniketan, Hyderabad.
- Salient features of the Early Islamic architecture in A.P (1989) Souvenir of the Centenary celebrations of the Victoria Jubilee Museum, Vijayawada.
- Seals and ceilings from Peddabankur, Epigraphia Andhrica, Vo.51989
- Recent Trends in Archaeology of Andhra Pradesh, Sectional Presidential Address, 51 Session of Indian History Congress, Calcutta, 1990
- Salvage archeological Operations under the Srisailam Project, (1990) Ithihas, and vol. 15 no.2. 1989
- Artistic Innovations During the Vijayanagara Times, with Reference to AP, Itihas, Vol XV, 1989
- Salient Features of Satavahana Material Culture, N.Ramesan Commemoration Volume, Satavahana Special, 1990
- Early Saiva Vestiges at Keesaragatta, (1990) Itihas, Vol. 15 No. 2
- A decade of Archaeology in Andhra Pradesh, (1983) Journal of Archaeology, University of Mysore.
- Early Islamic Architecture, Souvenir, Victoria Jubilee Museum Centenary Celebrations, 1987
- Salient features of Satavahana Material Culture, (1990) Andhra Pradesh Journal of Archaeology, Vol. 2 No.2.
- Position and Status of Women during the Medieval Andhra, (1991) Itihas, Von. 16 No.1
- Terracotta Art of Andhra Pradesh (1990), Gaurav.
- Indo Roman Trading Centers in Andhra Pradesh Ex Moneta, in Honour of David W. Mac Dowall, Bapu, Nasik, 1995
- Stucco As Decorative Art in Andhra Pradesh, Decorative Arts of India, Published by Salar Jung Museum Hyderabad, 1987.
- Architectural Affiliation of Andhra with Rock -Cut Caves of Ellora, Ellora Caves: Sculptures and Architecture, Seminar on Art History at Ellora 1988.
- Philosophy of Conservation. In Conservation, Preservation, @Restoration, Birla Archaeological and Cultural Research Institute, 1996.
- Recent Trends in Archaeology of Andhra Pradesh, Sectional Presidential Address, 51 Session, Indian History Congress, Calcutta December, 1990.
- Ramayana in Andhra Sculptural Art, Srinagabhinandana, Bangalore, 1995
- Three Copper Plate Grants of Pruthvisrimula Raja from Kondavidu, Journal of the Epigraphical Society of India, Vol 16, 1990
- Roman Coin Finds in the Karimnagar Region of Andhra, Foreign Coins found in the Indian Subcontinent, 4th International Colloquium, Indian Institute of Research in Numismatics, Nasik, 1995
- Kshtrapa Coin Hoard from Ghantasala, in Numismatic Panorama, S.M.Shukla Commemoration Vol. 1996
- Ramadasa_A Great Ramabhakta of Bhdrachalam, The Kalyana Kalpataru, Vol. XLII, December, 1996
- Bliss in Stillness, (Splendor of Andhra Temples) Maa Telugu Talli, Special Issue on Andhra Pradesh, Nagarjuna group,1998
- Recent Progress of Archaeology in Andhra Pradesh, Proceedings of the Colloquium on South Indian Archaeology, Bacri, Hyderabad, 2000
- Buddhism in Andhra, Andhra Sangita Saamskutika Mahotsavava special Issue, September, 2001
- The Enigma of Acharya Nagarjuna, Deccan Studies, Vol. 1, No.1, Jan-June, 2002
- Early Tantric Goddesses, Special Issue of the National Seminar on Tantrism, Birla Archeological and Cultural Research Institute, Hyderabad, 2002
- Megalithic Cultures- The Iron Age, Pre and Proto Historic Andhra Pradesh, Andhra Pradesh History Congress, Dravidian University, 2003
- A Historical Sketch Of Acharya Nagarjuna, Proceedings of the National Seminar, Salar Jung Museum, 2003.
- Nalgonda Region – An Archaeological Paradise, in Udayini, Special Issue of Panugallu Utsavam, 2001
- Maha Ganapati, Proceedings of the Andhra Pradesh History Congress, Narasapur, 2001
- R.Subrahmanyam, a Guide of My Destiny, Subrahmanyam Commemoration Volume, Editors, I.K.Sarma, B.Vidyadhara Rao, 2003
- The Symbolism of Lotus and Lajja Gouri, in Glimpses of our Past and Historical Researches, Felicitation Vol to Prof M.Radha Krishna Sarma, Dept. of History Osmania University, 2004.
- Historical Geography of Andhra Pradesh, General Presidential Address, 28th Session of Andhra Pradesh History Congress, Vijayavada, 2004.
- Tummanayeru Grant of Pulakesi 11. Brahmasri, P.V.Parabrahma Sastry Felicitation Vol. , 2004
- Sects of Buddhism in Andhra, Kevala_Bodhi, Buddhist and Jaina History of Deccan, 2004
- Freedom Movement in (Coastal) Andhra, Krishna Pushkaram Celebrations, Special Issue, 2004

=== Research Articles Published in Telugu ===
- Andhra Pradesh Raastram lo Puraatatva Parisodhanalu, Andhra Jyoti Special Issue, 1985
- Nagarjunkonda – Oka Bouddha Kshetram, (1987), Telugu Samacharam.
- Amaravathi, (1987), Telugu Samacharam.
- Bavikonda – Bouddharamam, (1988) Telugu Samacharam.
- Nelakondapalli (1988) Telugu Samacharam.
- Srisailam Project loni puratana kattadala parikshana charyalu, (1989) Telugu Vignanam.
- Charitrika Chihnalu, MaaTelugu Talliki Mallepooladanda, A special issue brought out by Andhra Jyothi.1989.
- Praachinaandhra Samskuti, Special Issue, Andhra Saaraswata Parishad Diamond Jubilee, 2003
- Praachina Naanemulu-Moosi Charitra Parisodhana Telugu, B.Nsastry Commemoration Volume,
- Tarataraala Telugu Samskruti, Moosi, November–December 2000.
- Brihatsilayuga Samskrutulu-Inupayugam, Andhra Pradesh Samagra Charitra Samskruti, Vol 1. Andhra Pradesh History Congress, 2003
