= Surampalli =

Surampalle
- Suburb
- Interactive map of Surampalle
- Location in Andhra Pradesh, India
- Coordinates: 16°35′5″N 80°43′7″E
- Country: India
- State: Andhra Pradesh
- District: Krishna
- Mandal: Gannavaram
- City: Vijayawada
- Metro: Andhra Pradesh Capital Region

Area
  - Total: 21.39 km^{2} (8.26 sq mi)

Population (7789)
  - Total: 2,011
  - Density: 94.02/km^{2} (243.5/sq mi)

Languages
  - Official: Telugu
- Time zone: UTC+5:30 (IST)
- Vehicle registration: AP

Surampalli is a north suburb of Vijayawada City. It is located in Krishna district of the Indian state of Andhra Pradesh. It is located in Gannavaram mandal. Surampalli village has most of the manufacturing industries like garments, mechanical etc.,. Next to the Auto Nagar area in Vijayawada city, we could see most of the manufacturing industries situated in Surampalli which is in the outskirts of Vijayawada city and is around 15KM distance from Vijayawada city. Mainly we could see most of the Iron and other metal making and moulding industries near to this village like Kusalava International, G.S. Polymers etc.,

== See also ==
- List of villages in Krishna district
- Madalavarigudem, nearby neightbourhood
- Mudirajupalem, nearby neightbourhood
