= Agiripalli mandal =

Agiripalli Mandal
- Mandal
- Interactive map of Agiripalli Mandal
- Location in Andhra Pradesh, India
- Coordinates: 16.6800°N 80.7852°E
- Country: India
- State: Andhra Pradesh
- District: Eluru
- Headquarters: Agiripalli

Area
  - Total: 224.08 km^{2} (86.52 sq mi)

Population (2011)
  - Total: 62,098
  - Density: 277.12/km^{2} (717.75/sq mi)

Languages
  - Official: Telugu
- Time zone: UTC+5:30 (IST)
- PIN: 521 XXX
- Vehicle registration: AP 16

Agiripalli mandal is one of the 28 mandals in Eluru district of the Indian state of Andhra Pradesh. It is under the administration of Nuzvid revenue division, with headquarters at Agiripalli. The mandal is bounded by Vijayawada (rural), Gannavaram, Bapulapadu, Nuzvid, Mylavaram and G.Konduru mandals.

== Administration ==
The mandal is partially a part of the Andhra Pradesh Capital Region under the jurisdiction of the Andhra Pradesh Capital Region Development Authority.

== Settlements ==
Agiripalli mandal consists of 25 villages. The following are the list of villages in the mandal:

1. Adivinekkalam
2. Agiripalli (CT) †
3. Ananthasagaram
4. Boddanapalle
5. Chopparametla
6. Edara
7. Edulagudem
8. Kalaturu
9. Kanasanapalle
10. Krishnavaram
11. Malliboinapalli
12. Narasingapalem
13. Nugondapalle
14. Pinnamareddipalle
15. Pothavarappadu
16. Sagguru
17. Suravaram
18. Tadepalle
19. Thotapalle
20. Vadlamanu
21. Vattigudipadu

Notes
(†) Mandal headquarter
