= Tempalli, Krishna district =

Tempalli
- Village
- Interactive map of Tempalli
- Location in Andhra Pradesh, India Tempalli (India)
- Coordinates: 16.5901°N 80.8309°E
- Country: India
- State: Andhra Pradesh
- District: Krishna
- Mandal: Gannavaram

Area
  - Total: 6.77 km^{2} (2.61 sq mi)

Population (2011)
  - Total: 2,661
  - Density: 393/km^{2} (1,020/sq mi)

Languages
  - Official: Telugu
- Time zone: UTC+5:30 (IST)
- Vehicle registration: AP

Tempalli is a village in Krishna district of the Indian state of Andhra Pradesh. It is located in Gannavaram mandal of Nuzvid revenue division.

== See also ==
- List of villages in Krishna district
