= Madalavarigudem =

- Village
- Interactive map of Madalavarigudem
- Location in Andhra Pradesh, India Madalavarigudem (India)
- Coordinates: 16°36′38″N 80°43′29″E
- Country: India
- State: Andhra Pradesh
- District: Krishna

Languages
  - Official: Telugu
- Time zone: UTC+5:30 (IST)
- PIN: 521212
- Telephone code: +91–866

Madalavarigudem is a village in Gannavaram mandal, located in Krishna district of the Indian state of Andhra Pradesh.
