= Kesarapalle =

- Suburb
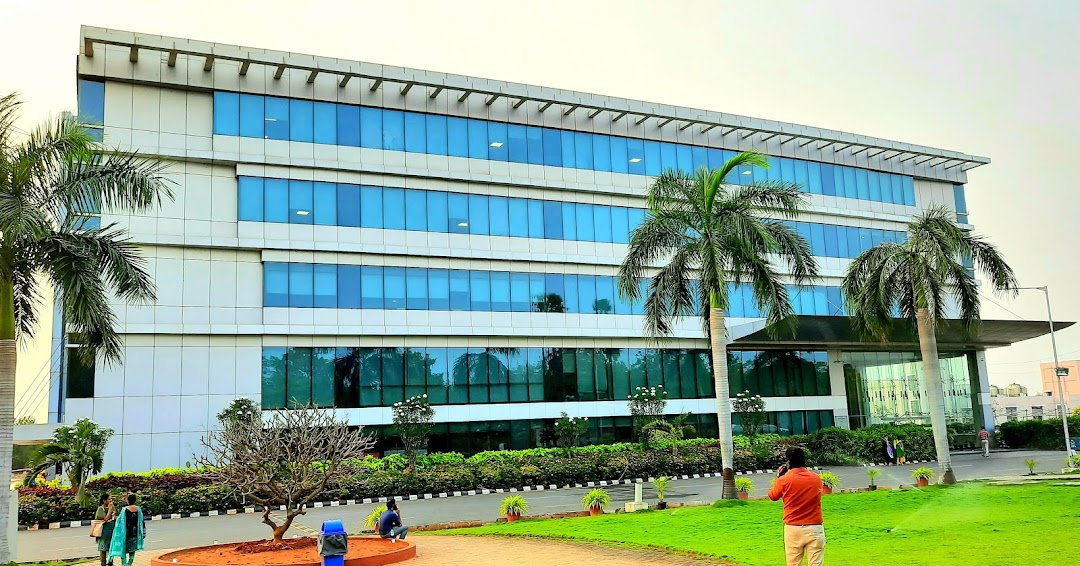
- Medha IT Park Tower 1

- Location in Andhra Pradesh, India Kesarapalle (India)
- Coordinates: 16°31′21.84″N 80°46′37.79″E
- Country: India
- State: Andhra Pradesh
- District: Krishna
- Mandal: Gannavaram
- City: Vijayawada
- Metro: Andhra Pradesh Capital Region

Area
  - Total: 17.70 km^{2} (6.83 sq mi)

Population (2011)
  - Total: 9,076
  - Density: 512.8/km^{2} (1,328/sq mi)

Languages
  - Official: Telugu
- Time zone: UTC+5:30 (IST)
- PIN: 521102

Kesarapalle is a Locality and major IT hub in Vijayawada city in Krishna district of the Indian state of Andhra Pradesh. It is located in Gannavaram mandal of Gudivada revenue division.

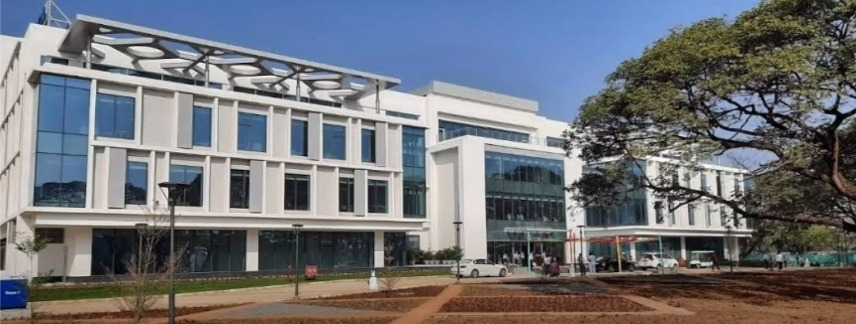
HCL Vijayawada in Kesarapalli

Medha IT park is located in the region.The major IT companies includes HCL and Tech Mahindra. As per the G.O. No. M.S.104 (dated:23-03-2017), Municipal Administration and Urban Development Department, it became a part of Vijayawada metropolitan area.

== Transport ==
It is located on AH-45. State run APS RTC City Bus services and it is well connected with, Benz circle, K.r Market, City Bus Port, Ramavarappadu Ring and Gannavaram . The nearest Railway stations are Gannavaram and Nidamanuru Railway stations. Vijayawada Airport is located here.
