= Vattigudipadu =

- Village
- Interactive map of Vattigudipadu
- Location in Andhra Pradesh, India Vattigudipadu (India)
- Coordinates: 16°44′N 80°52′E
- Country: India
- State: Andhra Pradesh
- District: Eluru

Area
  - Total: 10.59 km^{2} (4.09 sq mi)

Population (2011)
  - Total: 4,411
  - Density: 416.5/km^{2} (1,079/sq mi)

Languages
  - Official: Telugu
- Time zone: UTC+5:30 (IST)

Vattigudipadu is a village in Eluru district of the Indian state of Andhra Pradesh. It is located in Agiripalli mandal.

== See also ==
- Villages in Agiripalli mandal
