= China Avutapalli =

China Avutapalle
- Suburb
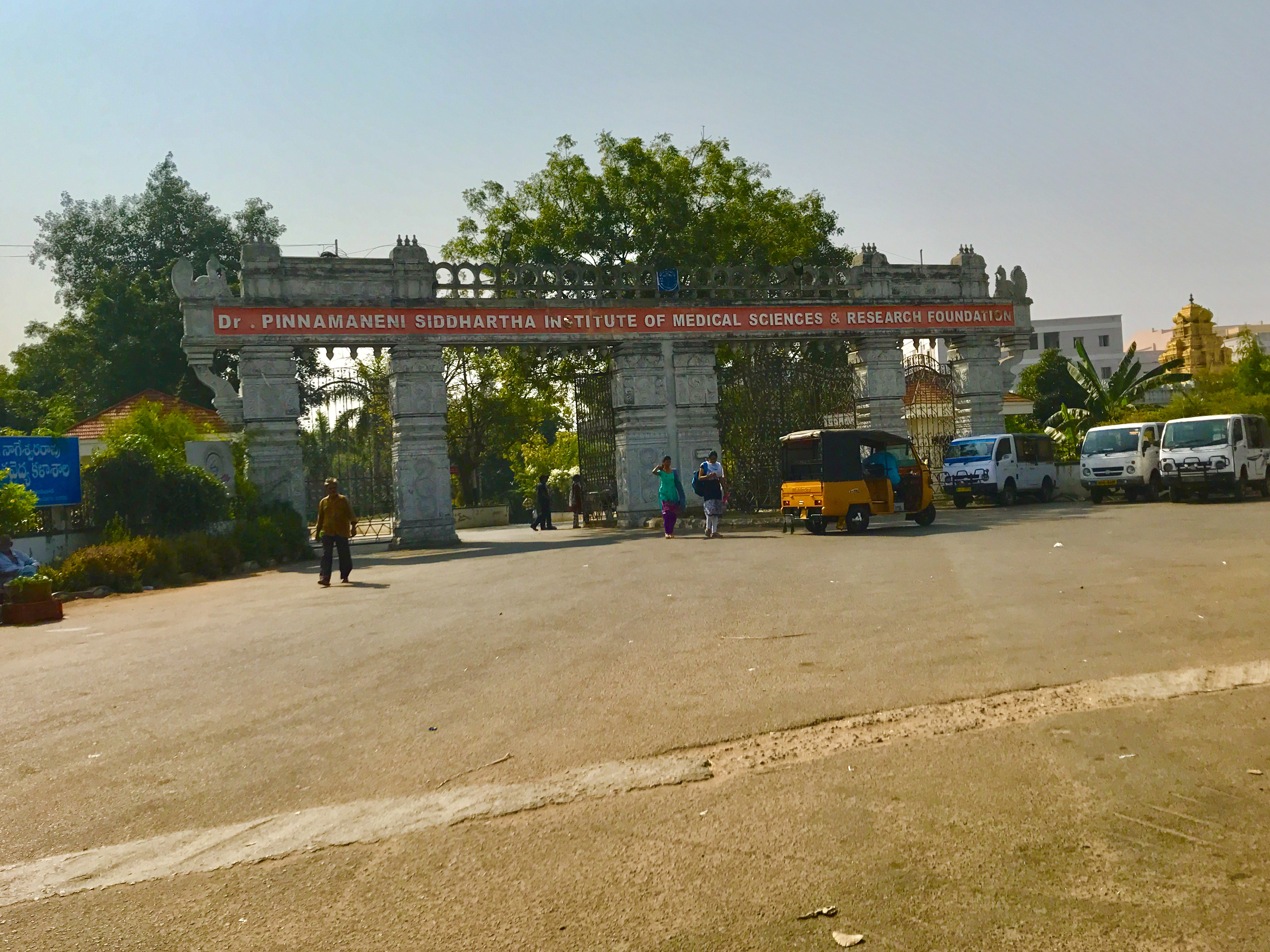
- Siddartha Institutions near Peda Avutapalli
- Interactive map of China Avutapalle
- Location in Andhra Pradesh, India
- Coordinates: 16.5571°N 80.8269°E
- Country: India
- State: Andhra Pradesh
- District: Krishna
- Mandal: Gannavaram
- City: Vijayawada
- Metro: Andhra Pradesh Capital Region

Area
  - Total: 4.05 km^{2} (1.56 sq mi)

Population (2011)
  - Total: 2,574
  - Density: 636/km^{2} (1,650/sq mi)

Languages
  - Official: Telugu
- Time zone: UTC+5:30 (IST)
- PIN: 521101

China Avutapalli is a village in Krishna district of the Indian state of Andhra Pradesh. It is located in Gannavaram mandal of Nuzvid revenue division. It is located 4 km from the Vijayawada Airport.

== Transport ==
Peda Avutapalli railway station is the nearest railway station.

Vijayawada International Airport is the nearest airport.
