= Kotilingala =

- Holy Site
- Location in Telangana, India Kotilingala (India)
- Coordinates: 18.861255°N 79.196488°E
- Country: India
- State: Telangana
- District: Jagtial

Languages
  - Official: Telugu
- Time zone: UTC+5:30 (IST)
- Vehicle registration: TS
- Website: telangana.gov.in

Kotilingala is a Hindu pilgrimage site in Jagtial district of the Indian state of Telangana. It is situated in Velagatoor mandal of the district, on the Godavari River. It is located on the bank of the Godavari River, and has a traditional Shiva temple for Hindus, the Koteshwara Siddeshwara Temple.

Archaeological discoveries at Kotilingala indicate that it was an important town during the period of the Assaka mahajanapada and the Satavahanas.

== History ==
Kotilingala has an archaeological site that was excavated by V. V. Krishna Sastry. The site has a mud fort with several gates and running 1054 metres long and 330 metres wide. A watch tower located in the south-eastern corner measures 11.5 * 10.55 m. Ancient pottery, beads, bricks querns, and other artifacts have been found at the site. Two hoards of punch-marked coins attributed to 2nd and 3rd centuries BCE have been found at the site. These coins were issued by Gobhada and Samagopa, who are believed to be local pre-Satavahana rulers.

Based on these discoveries, Kotilingala is believed to be a town of the ancient Asmaka (also Andhra or Assaka) Mahajanapada. The mud fortification, protected by a stream on its east and the Godavari river on its west, indicate its high political and commercial significance.

=== Satavahanas ===
Coins of Satavahana kings have also been found at Kotilingala. A few of these are copper and potin coins bearing the legend "Rano Siri Chimuka Satavahanasa". Some scholars such as A. M. Sastry and K. D. Bajpai have identified the issuer of these coins with Simuka, who is considered as the founder of the Satavahana dynasty based on the Puranic genealogies. However, others such as P. L. Gupta and I. K. Sarma have disputed this identification, arguing that the Kotilingala coins belonged to a later ruler with a similar or same name. P.V.P. Sastry, who first discovered these coins and attributed them to Simuka in 1978, also changed his view and later stated that Chimuka or Chhimuka of Kotilingala was not same as the Simuka mentioned in Naneghat inscription.

Other coins include those issued by Kanha and Satakarni. The inscriptions of the early Satavahanas have been found only in present-day Maharashtra (at Nashik and Naneghat), based on which western Deccan has been proposed as the original home of the Satavahanas. However, the discovery of coins at Kotilingala and other sites in present-day Andhra Pradesh and Telangana has prompted some historians such as M. Rama Rao to theorize that the eastern Deccan was also a part of the early Satavahana territory. V. V. Krishna Sastry theorized that the site was once a stronghold of the early Satavahanas. D. R. Reddy and S. Reddy proposed that Kotilingala was the original homeland of the Satavahanas. However, the Satavahana coin samples from Kotilingala are small in size, and it is not known where these coins were minted. S. Chattopadhyaya argues that coins can travel via trade, and this is not conclusive evidence of the early Satavahana presence in eastern Deccan. The archaeological evidence at Kotilingala suggests existence of long-distance trade.

== Developments ==
The State government has decided to construct a protection wall along the shores of river Godavari to protect the site from submergence under the backwaters of the Sripada Yellampalli project. There were transportation facilities to the towns located on the bank of the river Godavari such as Godavarikhani, Jagtial, Mancherial, and Karimnagar.
