= Mudirajupalem =

- Village
- Interactive map of Mudirajupalem
- Location in Andhra Pradesh, India Mudirajupalem (India)
- Coordinates: 16.58835°N 80.75249°E
- Country: India
- State: Andhra Pradesh
- District: Krishna
- Time zone: UTC+5:30 (IST)
- PIN: 521101
- Telephone code: 08676
- Nearest Town: Gannavaram
- Nearest city: Vijayawada
- Lok Sabha constituency: Machilipatnam
- Assembly constituency: Gannavaram

Mudirajupalem is a village located in Gannavaram mandal, Krishna district, Andhra Pradesh, India.

== Population ==
According to Indian electoral revision on 1 January 2016, nearly 570 voters are here in Mudirajupalem and approximate population figure is 800.
