= Gannavaram mandal =

- Mandal
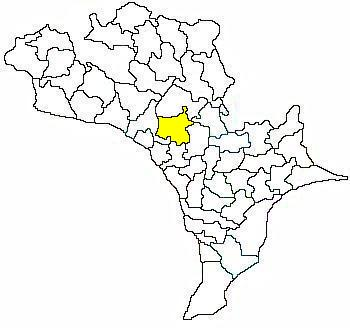
- Mandal map of Krishna district showing Gannavaram mandal (in yellow)
- Interactive map of Gannavaram mandal
- Location in Andhra Pradesh, India
- Coordinates: 16.5333°N 80.8000°E
- Country: India
- State: Andhra Pradesh
- District: Krishna
- Headquarters: Gannavaram

Area
  - Total: 196.56 km^{2} (75.89 sq mi)

Population (2011)
  - Total: 87,027
  - Density: 442.75/km^{2} (1,146.7/sq mi)

Languages
  - Official: Telugu
- Time zone: UTC+5:30 (IST)
- Vehicle registration: AP

Gannavaram mandal is one of the 25 mandals in Krishna district of the Indian state of Andhra Pradesh. It is under the administration of Gudivada revenue division and the mandal headquarters are located at Gannavaram. The mandal is bounded by Agiripalle, Bapulapadu, Unguturu, Vijayawada (rural) and Kankipadu mandals. The mandal is also a part of the Andhra Pradesh Capital Region under the jurisdiction of APCRDA.

== Demographics ==
As of 2011 census, the mandal had a population of 87,027. The total population constitute, 43,172 males and 43,855 females —a sex ratio of 1016 females per 1000 males. 8,098 children are in the age group of 0–6 years, of which 4,147 are boys and 3,951 are girls. The average literacy rate stands at 73.96% with 58,379 literates.

== Towns and villages ==
As of 2011 census, the mandal has 24 villages and no towns. Gannavaram is the most populated and Venkatanarasimhapuram is the least populated villages in the mandal.

The settlements in the mandal are listed below:

1. Ajjampudi
2. Allapuram
3. Bahubalendrunigudem
4. Balliparru
5. Buddavaram
6. Buthumillipadu
7. Chikkavaram
8. China Avutapalle
9. Gannavaram
10. Gollanapalle
11. Gopavarapugudem
12. Jakkulanekkalam
13. Kesarapalle
14. Kondapavuluru
15. Metlapalle
16. Purushottapatnam
17. Ramachandrapuram
18. Sagguruamani
19. Savarigudem
20. Surampalle
21. Tempalle
22. Vedurupavuluru
23. Veerapanenigudem
24. Venkatanarasimhapuram

== See also ==
- List of villages in Krishna district
- List of mandals in Andhra Pradesh
