= Dhulikatta =

- Country: India
- State: Telangana
- District: Peddapalli

Area
  - Total: 1,525 ha (3,770 acres)

Population
  - Total: 3,511
  - Density: 230.2/km^{2} (596.3/sq mi)

Languages
  - Official: Telugu
- Time zone: UTC+5:30 (IST)
- PIN: 505172
- Vehicle registration: TS
- Nearest city: Peddapalli, Karimnagar
- Lok Sabha constituency: Peddapalli
- Vidhan Sabha constituency: Peddapalli
- Latitude: 18.5548412
- Longitude: 79.257794
- Elevation / Altitude: 241 meters. Above Sea level
- Climate: temperate (Köppen)
- Website: telangana.gov.in

Dhulikatta is a village in Eligaid Mandal in Peddapalli district before it was in Karimnagar District in the state of Telangana earlier known as Andhra Pradesh in India. It is 15 km away from the Peddapalli District centre and 25 km from Karimnagar. The three day Satavahana festival is held there every year in January.

Dhulikatta is surrounded by Eligaid Mandal towards South, Peddapalli Mandal towards East, Sulthanabad Mandal towards South, Choppadandi Mandal towards west, and Karimnagar, Ramagundam, Mancherial, Jagtial are the nearby Cities to Dhulikatta.

== History ==
Dhulikatta was famous for Buddhist center. Buddhist stupa's were famous in Dhulikatta. The Buddhist Mahastupa or the great stupa and vihara in Dhulikatta village were established at the end of the 2nd century BC, which is more than 2000 years ago. During that period, the region played a greater role and thus was protected with numerous fortifications. According to many historians, the description of this fortified town which is situated on the banks of a river that has been conceptualized by the Greek emissary Megasthenes, matches with that of this town. The remains and ruins of this ancient stupa that has been built on an elevated place are still discernible. The constructions of platforms make the Mahastupa look larger. The lime-stone blocks that are elegantly carved are decorated with many Buddhist symbols like the Muchalinda Naga (a snake from the Buddhist mythology). Several other remnants such as the punched coins from Roman Kingdom and Satvahana dynasty, beads, combs made of ivory, bangles and authentic silver jewelleries have been brought to light in the excavations around the Mahastupa in Dhulikatta.

== Transport ==
TSRTC Operates buses from Dhulikatta to major Towns like Peddapalli, Godavarikani & Karimnagar. Peddapalli railway station is nearest railway station to Dhulikatta.
