= Agiripalli =

- Suburb
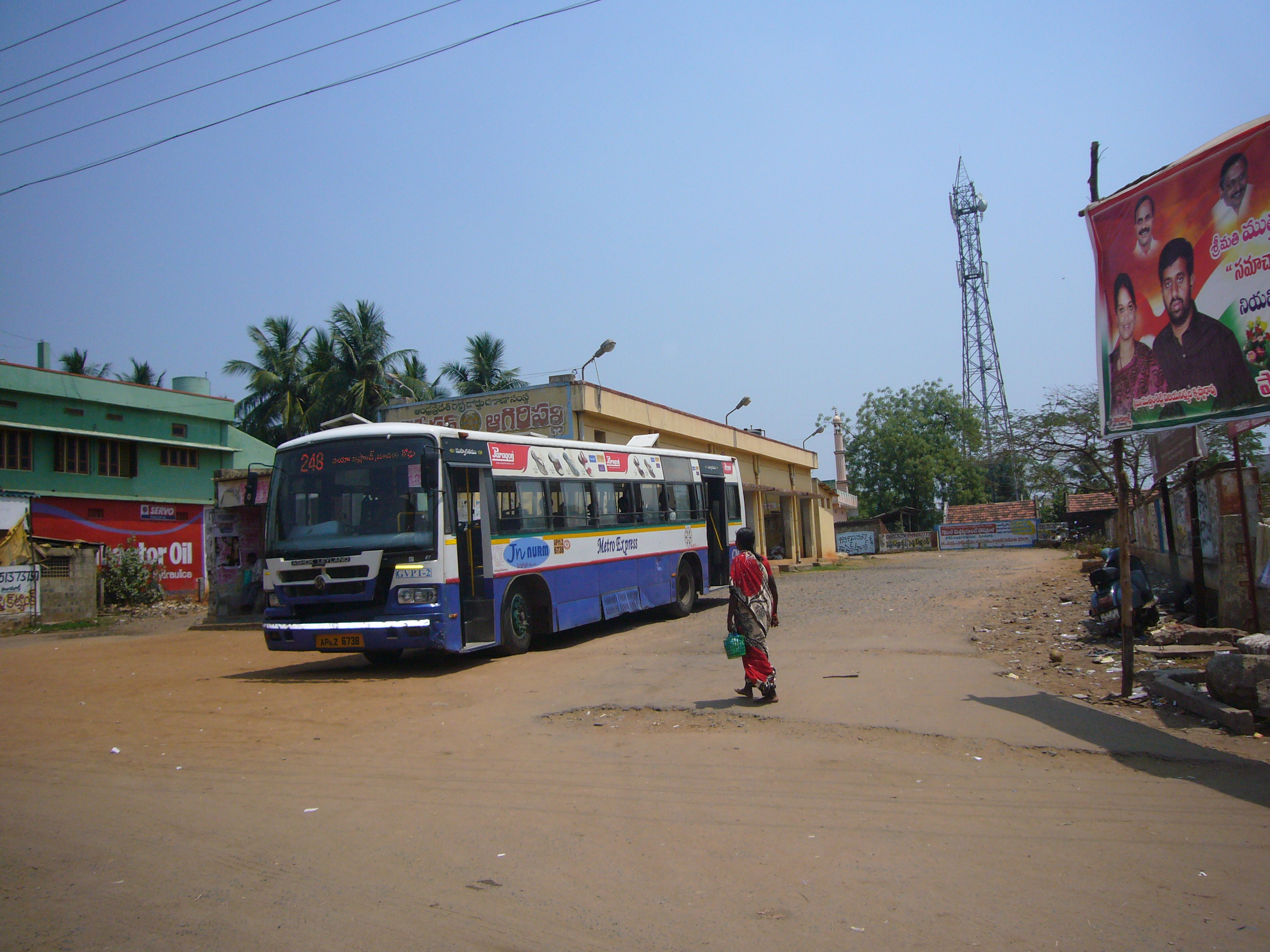
- Interactive map of Agiripalli
- Location in Andhra Pradesh, India
- Coordinates: 16°40′54″N 80°47′2″E
- Country: India
- State: Andhra Pradesh
- District: Eluru

Area
  - Total: 15.34 km^{2} (5.92 sq mi)

Population (2011)
  - Total: 13,283
  - Density: 865.9/km^{2} (2,243/sq mi)

Languages
  - Official: Telugu
- Time zone: UTC+5:30 (IST)
- Postal code: 521 211
- Vehicle registration: AP 16
- Website: http://agiripalli.in

Agiripalli is a village, North suburb of Vijayawada and Mandal Headquarters, in Eluru district of the Indian state of Andhra Pradesh. It is located in Agiripalli mandal Agiripalli is famous for Laxmi Narsimha Swamy Temple.
