= Bhir Mound =

Archaeological site in Taxila, Pakistan

- بھڑ ماونڈ (Urdu)
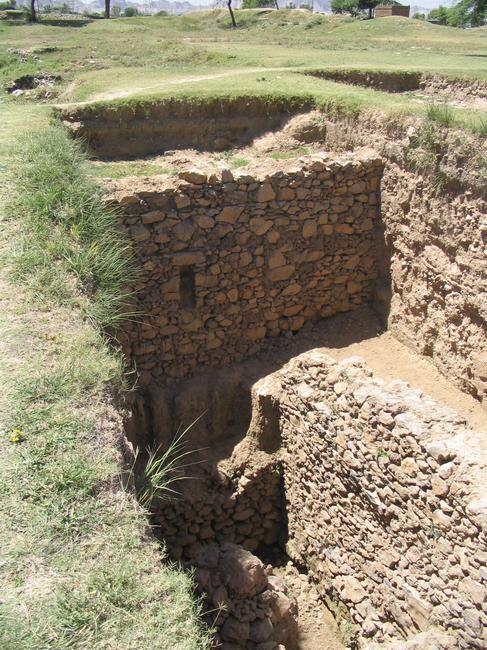
- The ruins of Bhir Mound, Taxila, Pakistan

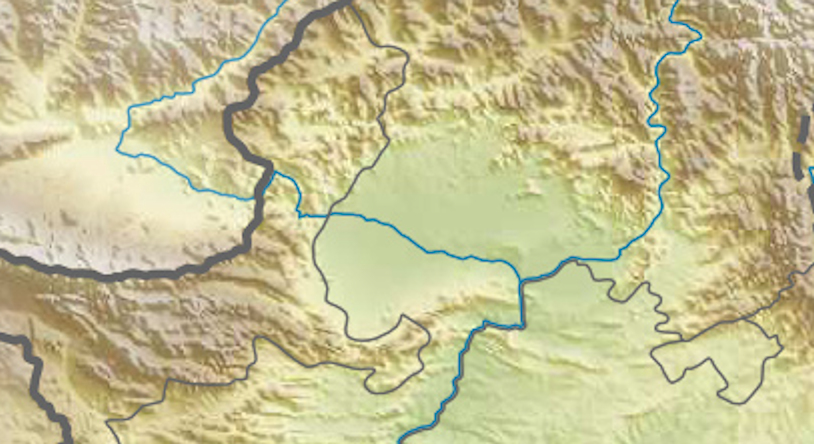
- Location within Pakistan Location within Gandhara
- 33°44′39″N 72°49′12″E
- Type: Settlement
- Periods: Achaemenid, Indo-Greeks
- Cultures: Gandhara

History
- Built: c. 800–525 BC
- Abandoned: c. 1st century BC

Site notes
- Archaeologists: John Marshall; Mortimer Wheeler; Mohammad Sharif

UNESCO World Heritage Site
- Official name: Taxila
- Criteria: iii, iv
- Designated: 1980
- Reference no.: 139

Taxila archaeological sites

The Bhir Mound (Urdu: بھڑ ماونڈ) is an archaeological site in Taxila in the Punjab province of Pakistan. It contains some of the oldest ruins of Ancient Taxila, dated to sometime around the period 800–525 BC as its earliest layers bear "grooved" Red Burnished Ware, the Bhir Mound, along with several other nearby excavations, form part of the Ruins of Taxila – inscribed as a UNESCO World Heritage Site in 1980.

== Context ==
The Bhir Mound archaeological remains represent one stage of the historic city of Taxila. The first town in Taxila was situated in the Hathial mound in the southwest corner of the Sirkap site. It lasted from the late second millennium BC until the Achaemenid period, with the Achaemenid period remains located in its Mound B. The Bhir Mound site represents the second city of Taxila, beginning in the pre-Achaemenid period and lasting till the early Hellenistic period. The earliest occupation on the Bhir mound began around 800–525 BC, and what now appears to be the second phase might date to the late 6th and 5th centuries BC, as originally suggested by Marshall.

== Excavation ==
The ruins of Bhir Mound were excavated from 1913–1925 by Sir John Marshall. The work was continued by Sir Mortimer Wheeler in 1944–1945 and by Dr. Mohammad Sharif in 1966–1967. Further excavations were performed in 1998–2000 by Bahadur Khan and in 2002 by Dr. Ashraf and Mahmud-al-Hassan.

Marshall came to the Bhir Mound project from earlier work in Athens, expecting very much to find a Greek city in Taxila. Klaus Karttunen says that he became more objective later on, but scholars mention various problems with his results. In his report, Marshall proposed that the Bhir Mound city of Taxila was founded by Darius I as the capital of the Achaemenid province of Hindush. Scholar David Fleming says that the identification was based on 'classical sources and a frankly pro-western bias'. The excavations were conducted without much regard to stratigraphic recording, and the pottery finds were published in such a manner as to preclude a detailed analysis.

The results of Mortimer Wheeler's excavations were never published. Later excavations by Mohammad Sharif were done more carefully with regard to chronological considerations, and they form the basis for the modern assessments.

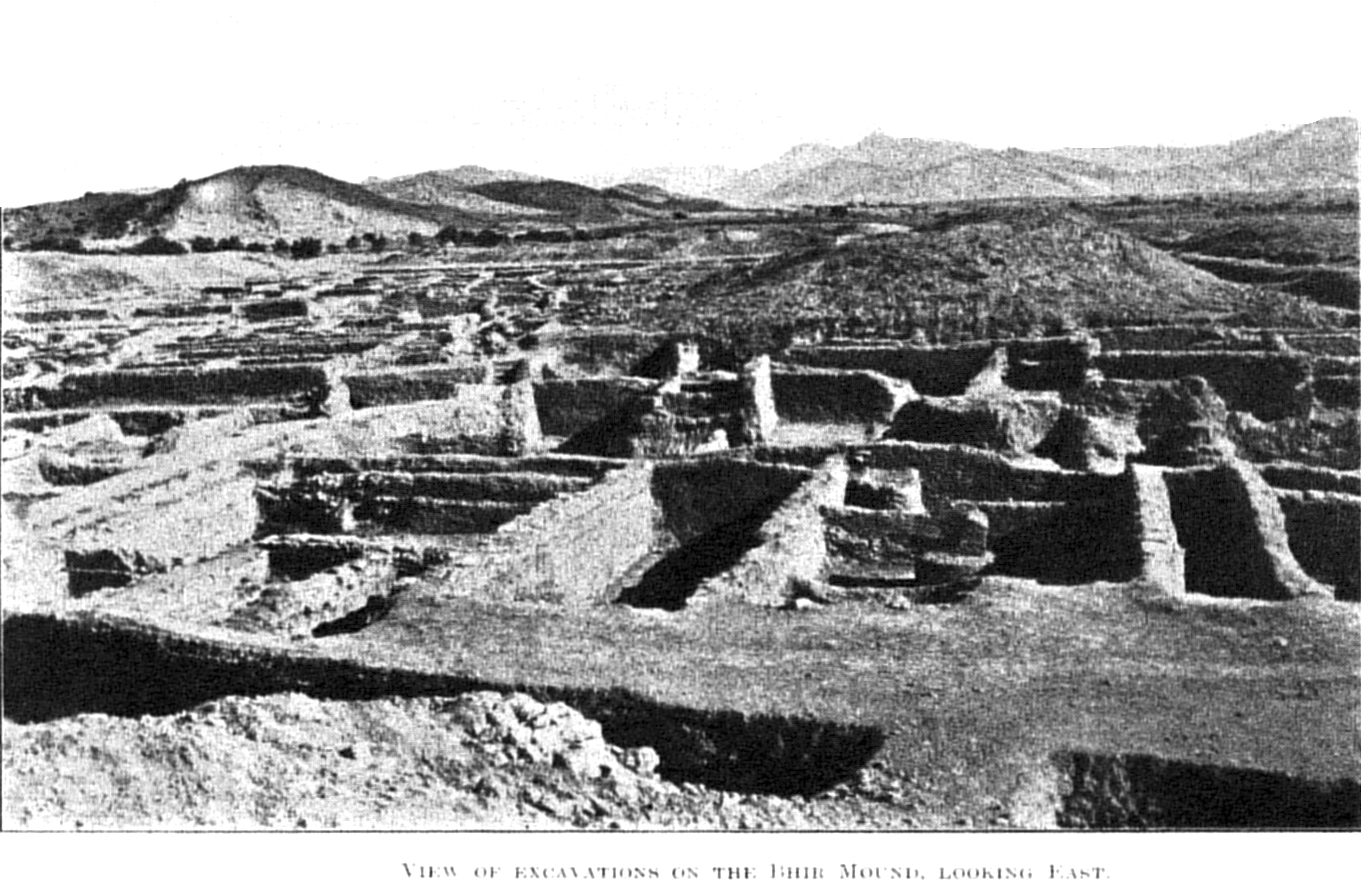
Bhir Mound excavations in 1924-1925

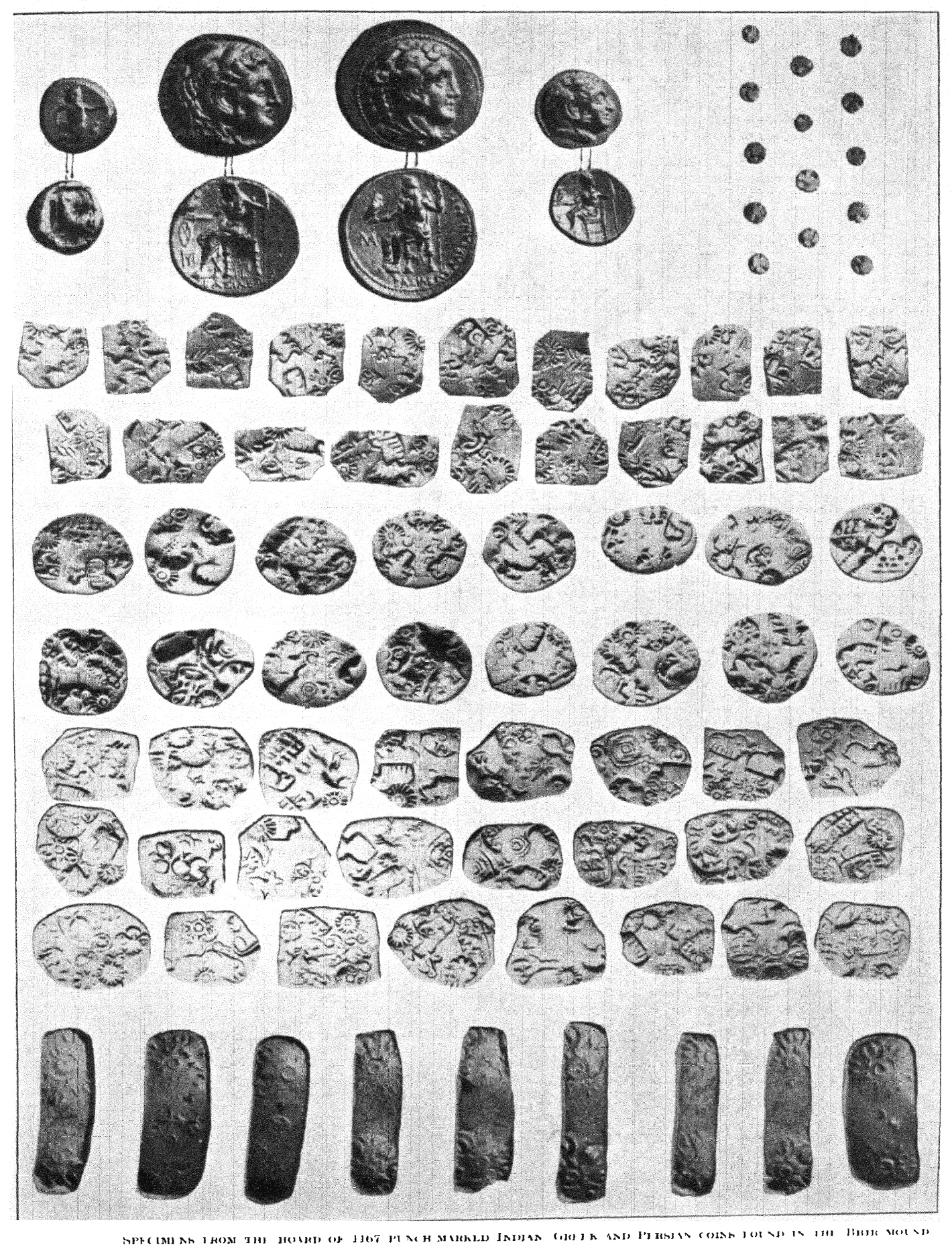
Bhir Mound coin hoard sample, with Achaemenid, Greek and Indian coinage

== Ruins ==
The ruins of the town form an irregular shape measuring around 1 km from north to south and about 600 meters from east to west.

The streets of the city show that they were narrow and the house plans were very irregular. There is little evidence of planning – most of the streets are very haphazard. The houses had no windows to the outside. They opened towards inner courtyards. The courtyard was open and 15 to 20 rooms were arranged around it.

== History ==
John Marshall stated, based on his excavations during 1913–1934, that heavy masonry of the Achaemenid buildings formed the earliest stratum of the Bhir Mound site. He believed that Taxila formed part of the 20th satrapy of Darius I (called Hinduš by the Persians or Indos by the Greeks). This claim was considered dubious by several scholars. and it is invalidated by the current dating of the Bhir Mound site as beginning before 525 BC as Cameron Petrie suggests. Other scholars doubt if Taxila ever belonged to the Achaemenid Empire.

In 326 BC, Alexander the Great conquered the area. Raja Ambhi surrendered to Alexander and offered him a force of soldiers mounted on elephants. In 316 BC, Chandragupta of Magadha, the founder of the Mauryan dynasty, conquered Punjab. Taxila lost its independence and became a mere provincial capital. Still, the city remained extremely important as a centre of administration, education and trade. During the reign of Chandragupta's grandson Ashoka, Buddhism became important and the first monks settled in Taxila. Ashoka is said to have resided here as the vice-king of his father. In 184 BC, the Greeks, who had maintained a kingdom in Bactria, invaded Gandhara and Punjab again. From then on, a Greek king resided in Taxila, Demetrius.

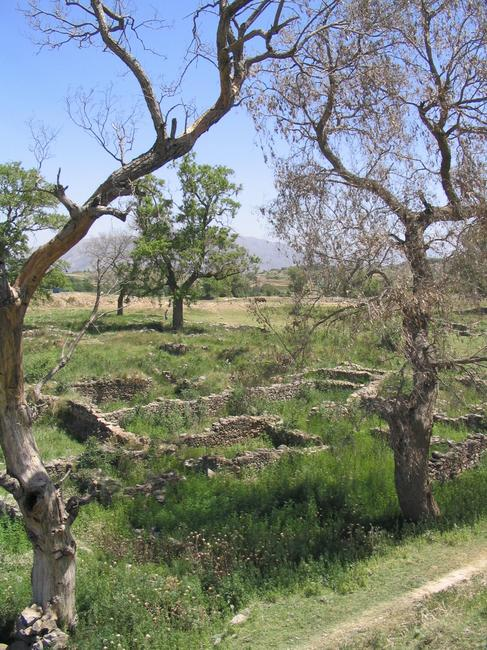
Bhir Mound with trees

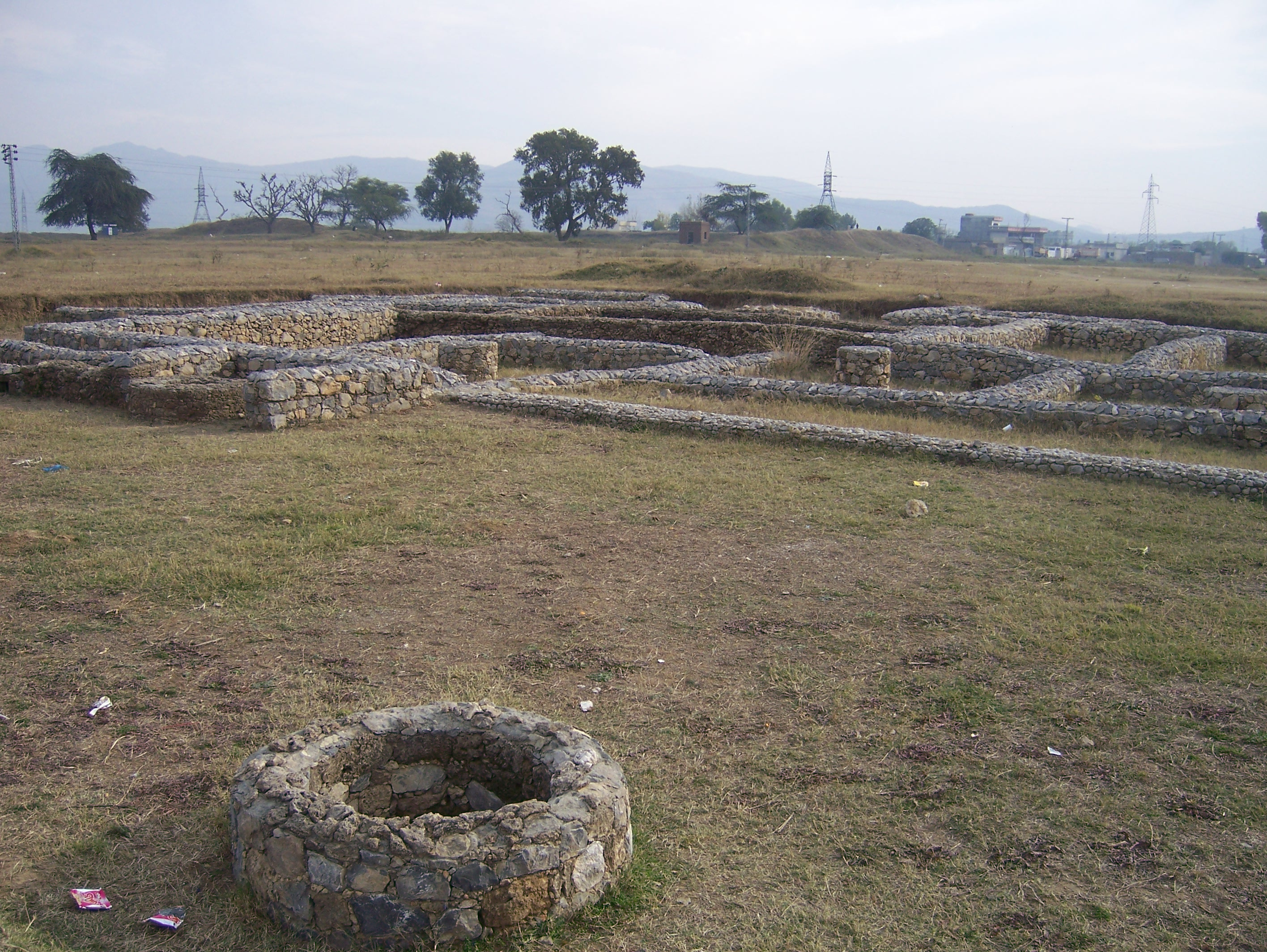
Bhir Mound, ruins

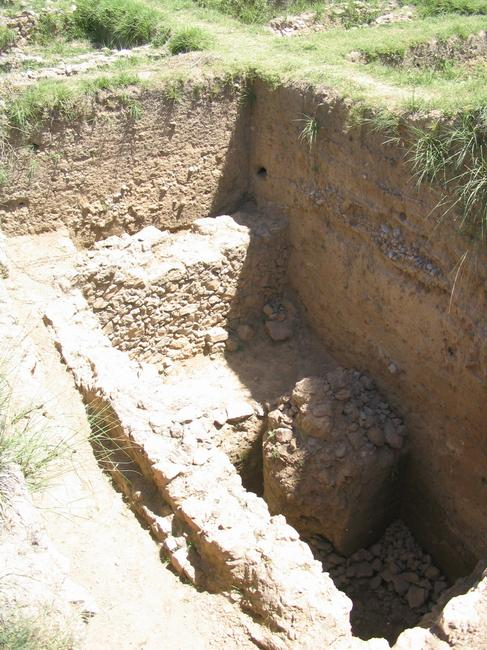
Bhir Mound excavations

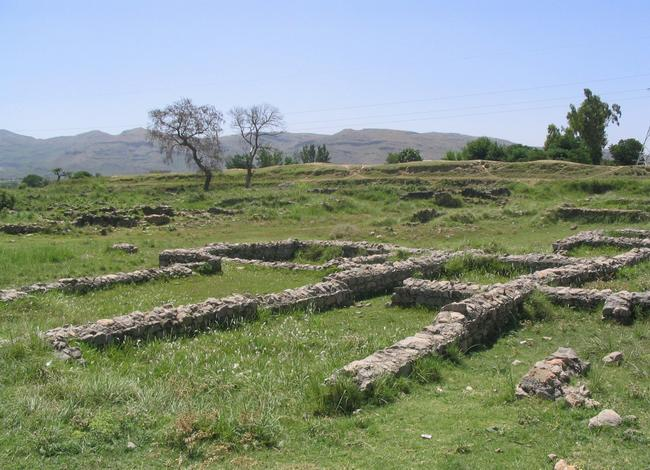
Bhir Mound, general view

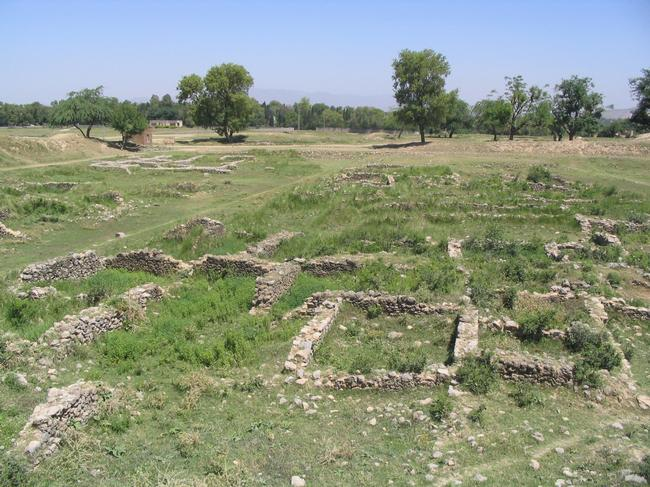
Bhir Mound, houses (center) and main street (left)

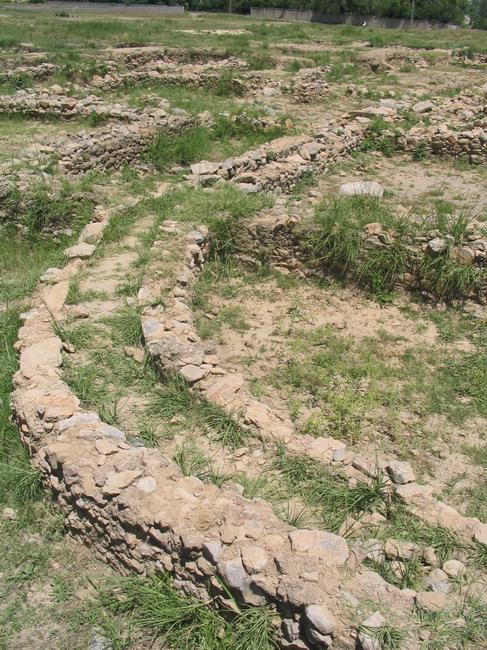
Bhir Mound, water conduits

== Achaemenid period coin hoard ==
Bhir Mound Achaemenid coin hoard

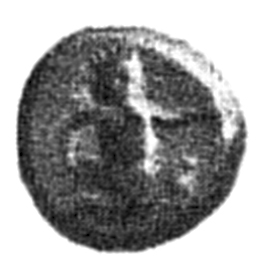
Achaemenid siglos found in the Bhird Mound hoard, Archer king type, c. 5th century BC

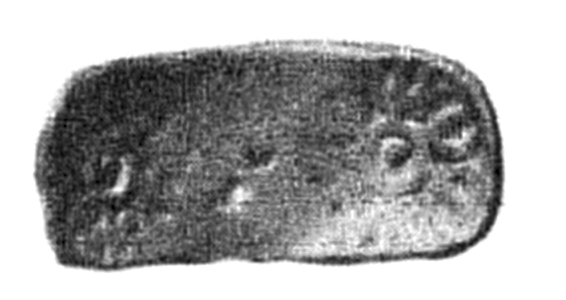
Short "bent bar" from the Bhir Mound hoard. Such coins were minted under Achaemenid administration, and were found in large quantities in the Chaman Hazouri hoard and the Bhir Mound hoard.

The Bhir Mound coin hoard has revealed numerous Achaemenid coins as well as several Greek coins from the 5th and 4th centuries BC which circulated in the area, at least as far as the Indus during the reign of the Achaemenids, who were in control of the areas as far as Gandhara. Many of these coins are similar to the local coins struck in Kabul, and found in the Chaman Hazouri hoard. This is the case in particular for the Achaeminid siglos type of coins of the 5th century, as well as the Gandharan bent-bar punch-marked coins, found in large quantities at Bhir Mound.

Modern numismatists tend to consider that these Gandharan bent-bar punch-marked coins are the precursors of the Indian punch-marked coins.

Coins of Philip III and Alexander the Great were also found in Bhir Mound.

Many Indian punch-marked coins were also found. Bhir Mound finds (1924–1945), at Taxila, Pakistan, includes Maurya coins issued in 248 BCE.

== Other sites in the area ==
There are important ancient Buddhist sites in this area, such as Dharmarajika, Mohra Muradu, and Jaulian.

Also, there are the remains of other ancient cities that were founded after Bhir Mound, such as Sirkap and Sirsukh.

== See also ==
- Achaemenid invasion of the Indus Valley

== Bibliography ==
- Allchin, F. Raymond (1993), "The Urban Position of Taxila and Its Place in Northwest India-Pakistan", Studies in the History of Art, 31: 69–81, JSTOR 42620473
- Bopearachchi, Osmund; Cribb, Joe (1992), "Coins illustrating the History of the Crossroads of Asia", in Errington, Elizabeth; Cribb, Joe; Claringbull, Maggie (eds.), The Crossroads of Asia: transformation in image and symbol in the art of ancient Afghanistan and Pakistan, Ancient India and Iran Trust, pp. 57–59, ISBN 978-0-9518399-1-1
- Bopearachchi, Osmund (2000), "Coin Production and Circulation in Central Asia and North-West India (Before and after Alexander's Conquest)", Indologica Taurinensia, 25, International Association of Sanskrit Studies
- Bopearachchi, Osmund (2017), "Achaemenids and Mauryans: Emergence of Coins and Plastic Arts in India", in Alka Patel; Touraj Daryaee (eds.), India and Iran in the Longue Durée, UCI Jordan Center for Persian Studies, pp. 15–48
- Fleming, David (1993), "Where was Achaemenid India?", Bulletin of the Asia Institute, New Series, 7: 67–72, JSTOR 24048427
- Karttunen, Klaus (1 January 1990), "Taxila: Indian City and a Stronghold of Hellenism (concerning two recent books)", Acta Philologica Fennica, 24: 85–96
- Marshall, John (1951). Taxila, Volume II: Minor Antiquities. Cambridge University Press.
