= Sirsukh =

Ancient City in Pakistan

Sirsukh سر سکھ
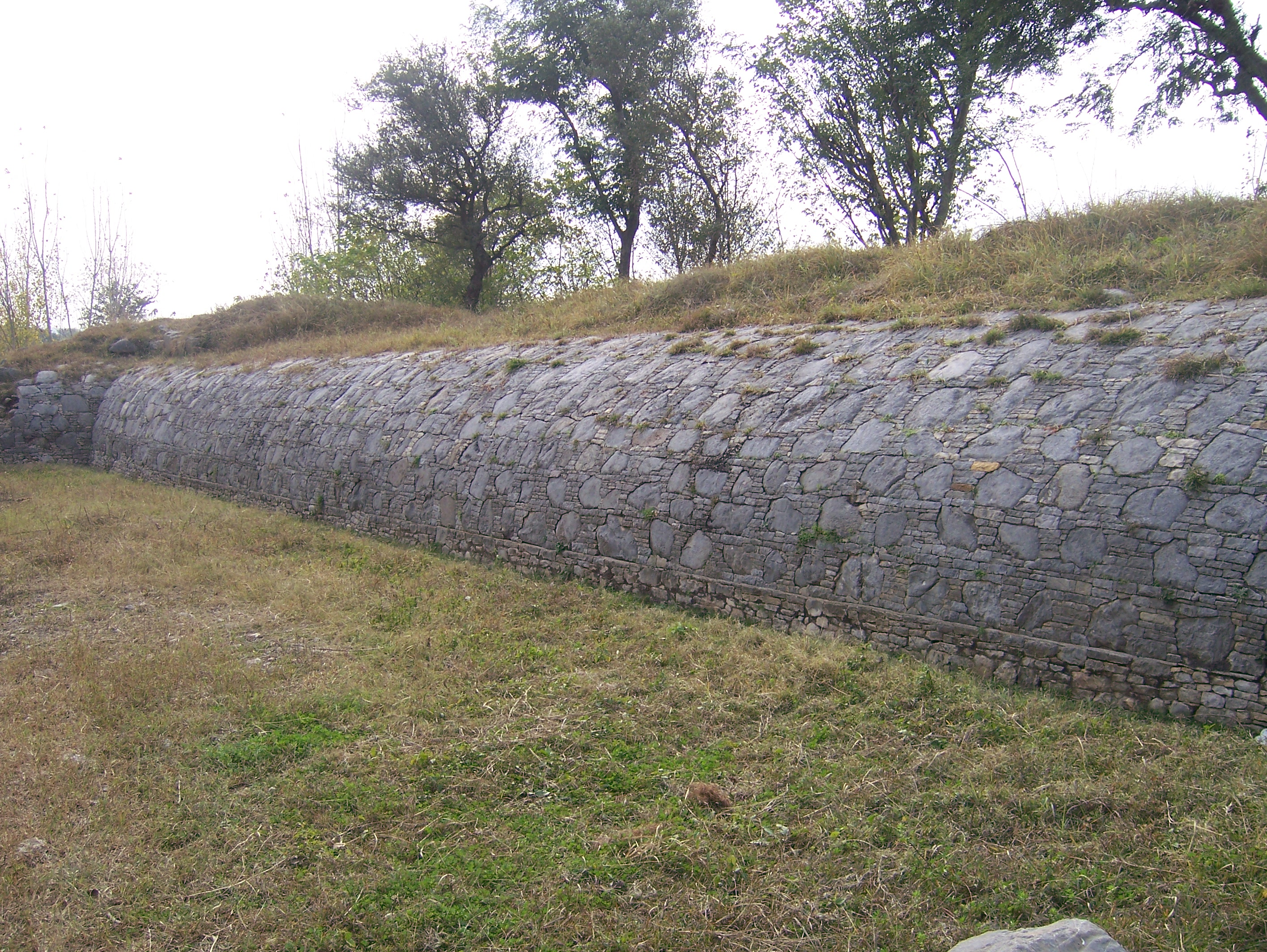
- The wall of Sirsukh, Taxila. Taxila archaeological sites

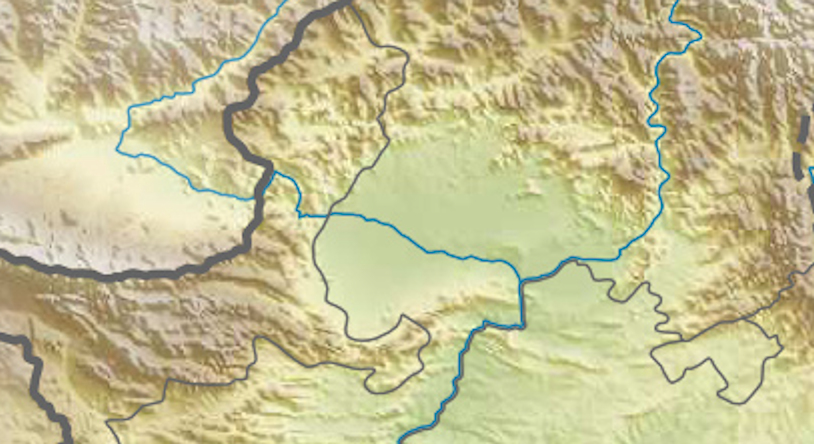
- Location within Pakistan Location within Gandhara
- 33.772600°N 72.847922°E
- Type: Settlement
- Cultures: Gandhara

History
- Built: late 1st century C.E.
- Abandoned: mid 5th century C.E.

UNESCO World Heritage Site
- Official name: Taxila
- Criteria: iii, iv
- Designated: 1980
- Reference no.: 139

Sirsukh (Urdu: سر سکھ) is an ancient city that forms part of the ruins at Taxila, near the modern day city of Taxila, Punjab, Pakistan.

City The city of Sirsukh is said to have been founded during the Kushan era after 80 CE, and is the last of the great ancient cities of Taxila. The invaders decided to abandon the older city of Sirkap and build a newer city on the other side of the Lundi-nala. The wall of the city is about 5 kilometers long and about 5.4 meters thick. The city wall covers an area of around 2300 x 1000 meters seen along the east-west direction, and is laid out in a typical Central Asian style, complete with suburbs. Sirsukh was left uninhabited when the White Huns invaded the Punjab at the end of the fifth century CE. To the north-east of the city flows the Harro river whereas to the south the Lundi-ravine is present.

The ancient city was excavated only on a very small scale in 1915-16 CE, and further excavation work has been impeded by a high water table which threatens the integrity of ancient structures. It was included in the World Heritage List of the UNO in 1980 as part of Taxila.

== Wall ==
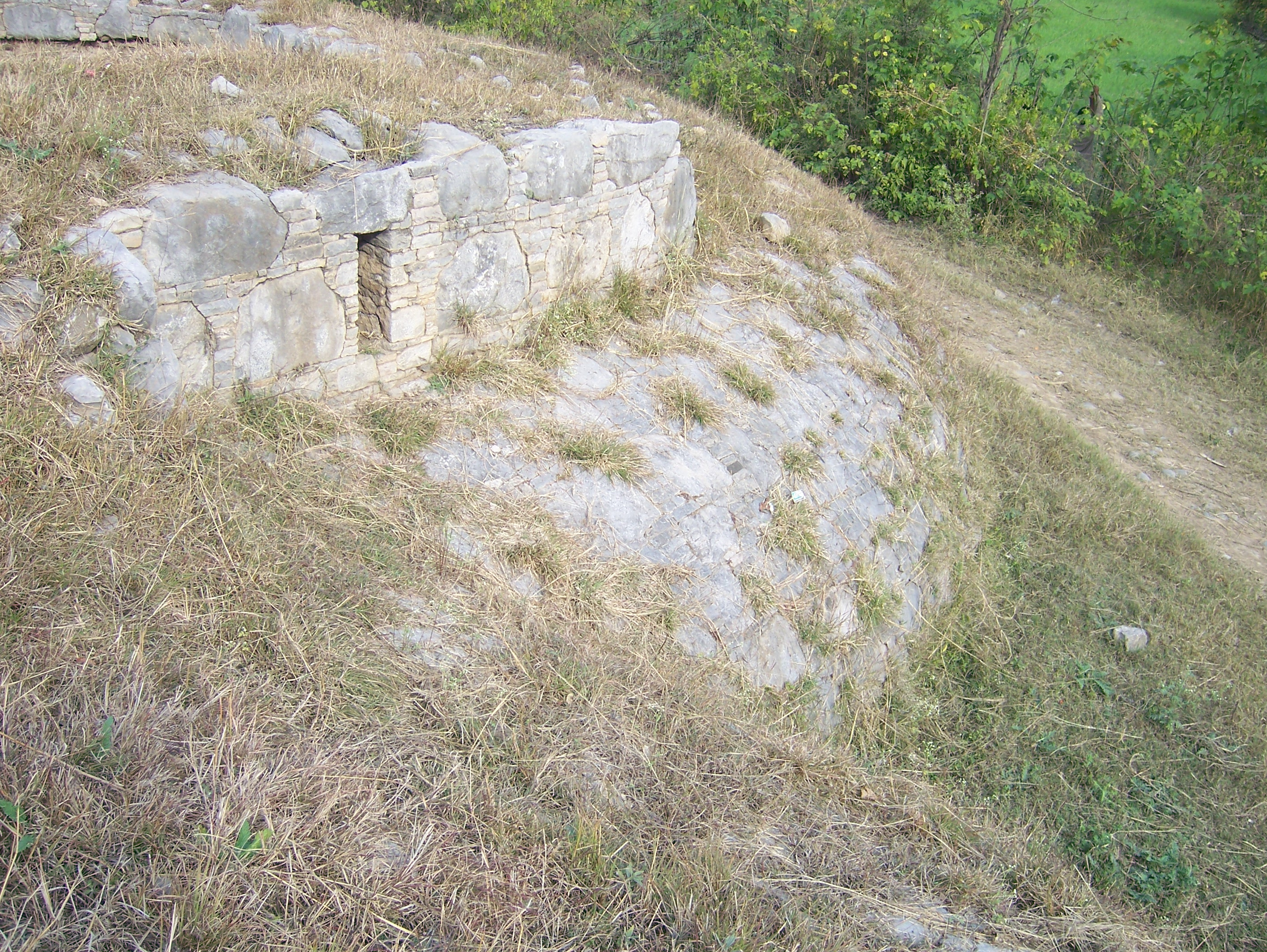
Bastion in the wall of Sirsukh with hole for the archers, Taxila.

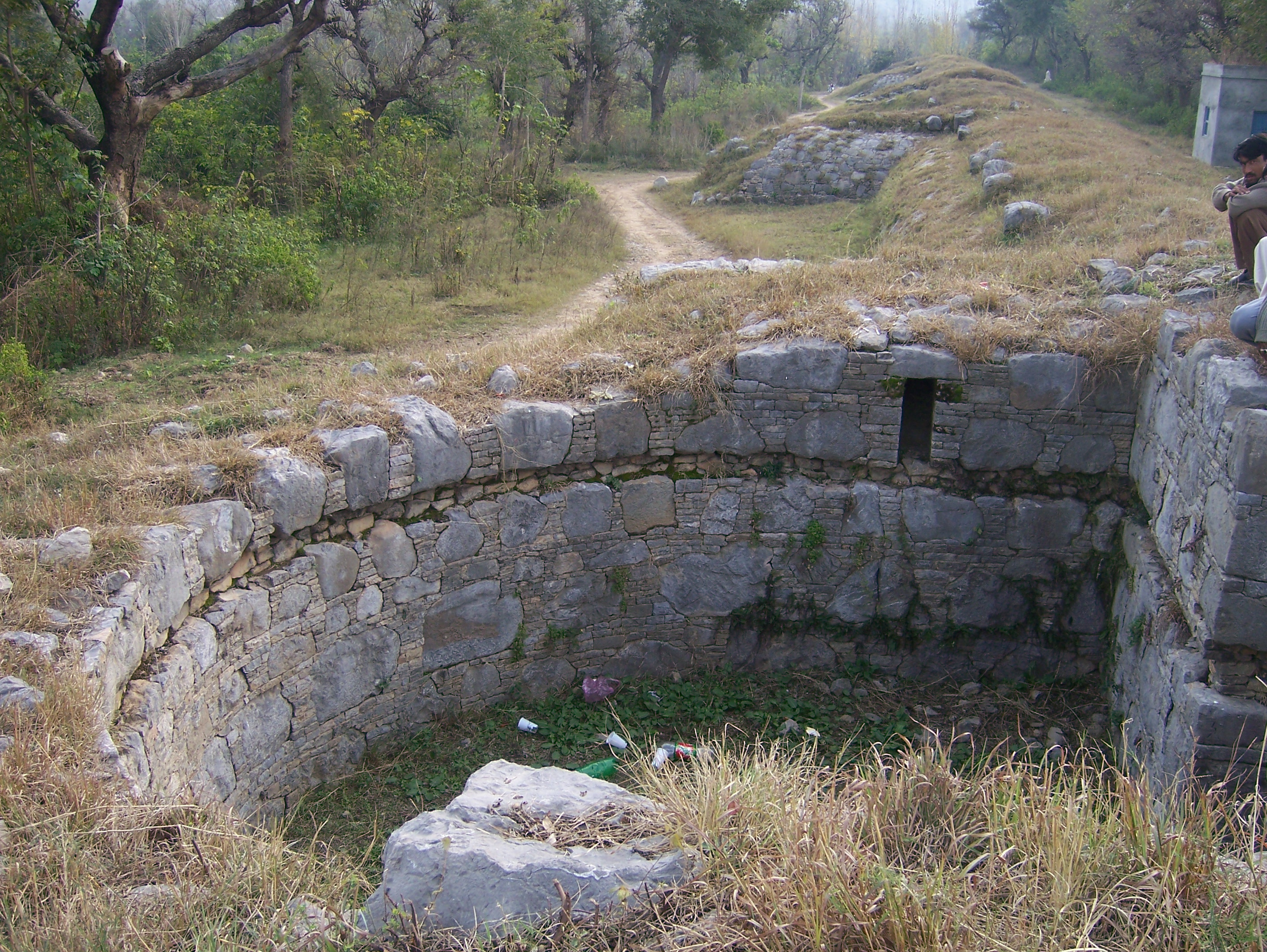
Inside the Bastion in the wall of Sirsukh, Taxila.

The wall of the city is made of large stone bricks with smaller stone bricks in-between the larger ones. It is remarkably smooth on the outer side. Circular bastions are present in the wall at small distances for defence. These bastions contain holes for archers who could shoot arrows at the enemy outside.

== See also ==
- Bhir Mound
- Dharmarajika
- Jaulian
- Mohra Muradu
- Sirkap
- Taxila
- Taxila under the Achaemenids
- Taxila Tehsil
- Ancient institutions of learning in Pakistan
