= Jaulian =

Former Buddhist monastery in Pakistan

- جولیاں (Urdu)
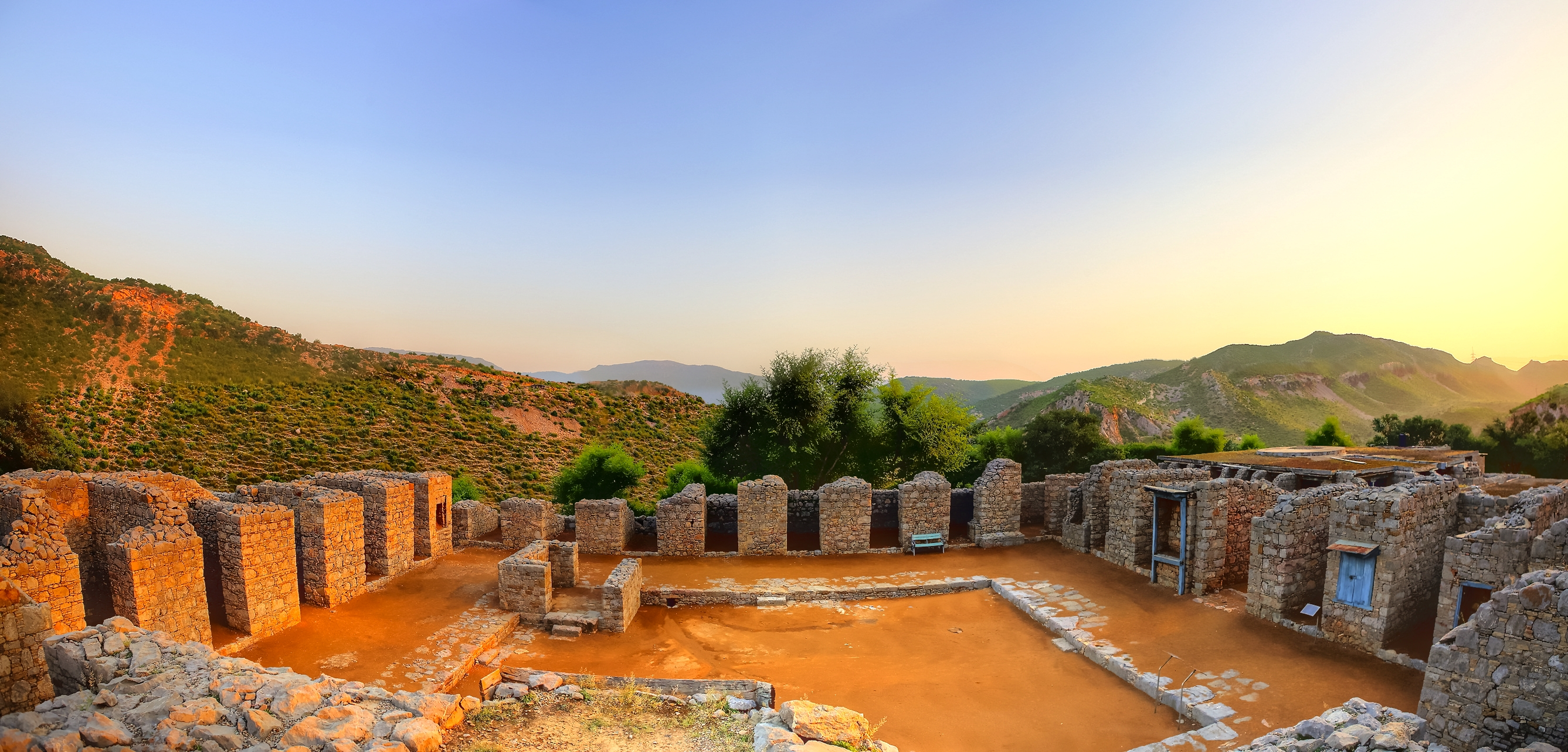
- A view of the ruins of Jaulian (Monastery area) and Ancient university in world

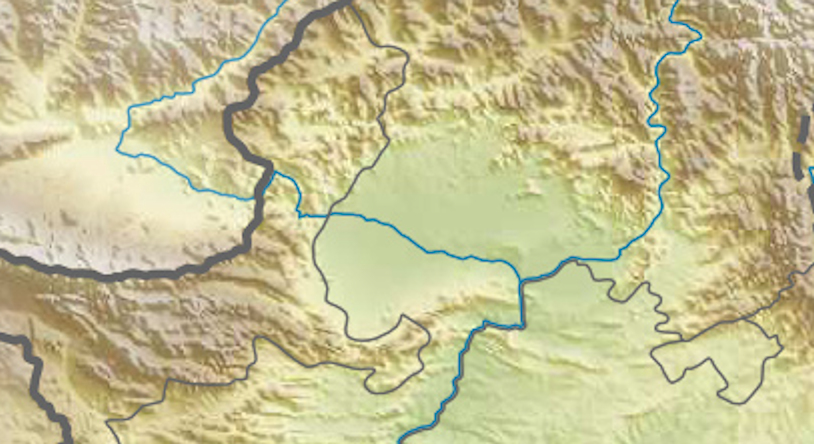
- Location within South Asia Location within Pakistan Location within Gandhara
- 33.76552°N 72.87498°E
- Type: Monastery
- Location: Taxila

History
- Built: 2nd century CE
- Abandoned: mid 5th century CE

Site notes
- Archaeologists: Sir John Marshall

UNESCO World Heritage Site
- Official name: Taxila
- Criteria: iii, iv
- Designated: 1980
- Reference no.: 139

Jaulian (Urdu: جولیاں; meaning Seat of Saints) is a ruined Buddhist monastery dating from the 2nd century CE, located in Taxila, in Pakistan.

Jaulian, along with the nearby monastery at Mohra Muradu, form part of the Ruins of Taxila – a collection of excavations that were inscribed as a UNESCO World Heritage Site in 1980.

== Location ==
Jaulian is located on a hill 100 metres above the nearby modern village of Jaulian. The cities of Rawalpindi and Islamabad are approximately 35 km and 45 km to the southeast, respectively and situated near Khanpur Taxila road; a picnic place near Khanpur Dam. Jaulian is located near the Mohra Muradu monastery, and the ancient Taxilan city of Sirsukh. Moreover, Piplan Remains, Badalpur Stupa and Jinnah Wali Dheri Stupa are nearby places.

== History ==
Jaulian was built in the 2nd-century CE – around the same time as the nearby Mohra Muradu Jaulian, along with the rest of Ancient Taxila, was devastated in the 450s CE during the invasion of the White Huns, and later abandoned. Subsequent rulers, such as the Hun King Mihirakula, persecuted the region's Buddhists, and the site never recovered.

== Excavations ==
The ruins at Jaulian are situated on a hill top, and consist of: a main central stupa, 27 peripheral smaller stupas, 59 small chapels displaying scenes from the life of Buddha, and two quadrangles around which monastic living quarters were arranged. The form and building of Jaulian is similar to that of the nearby Mohra Muradu.

=== Main stupa ===
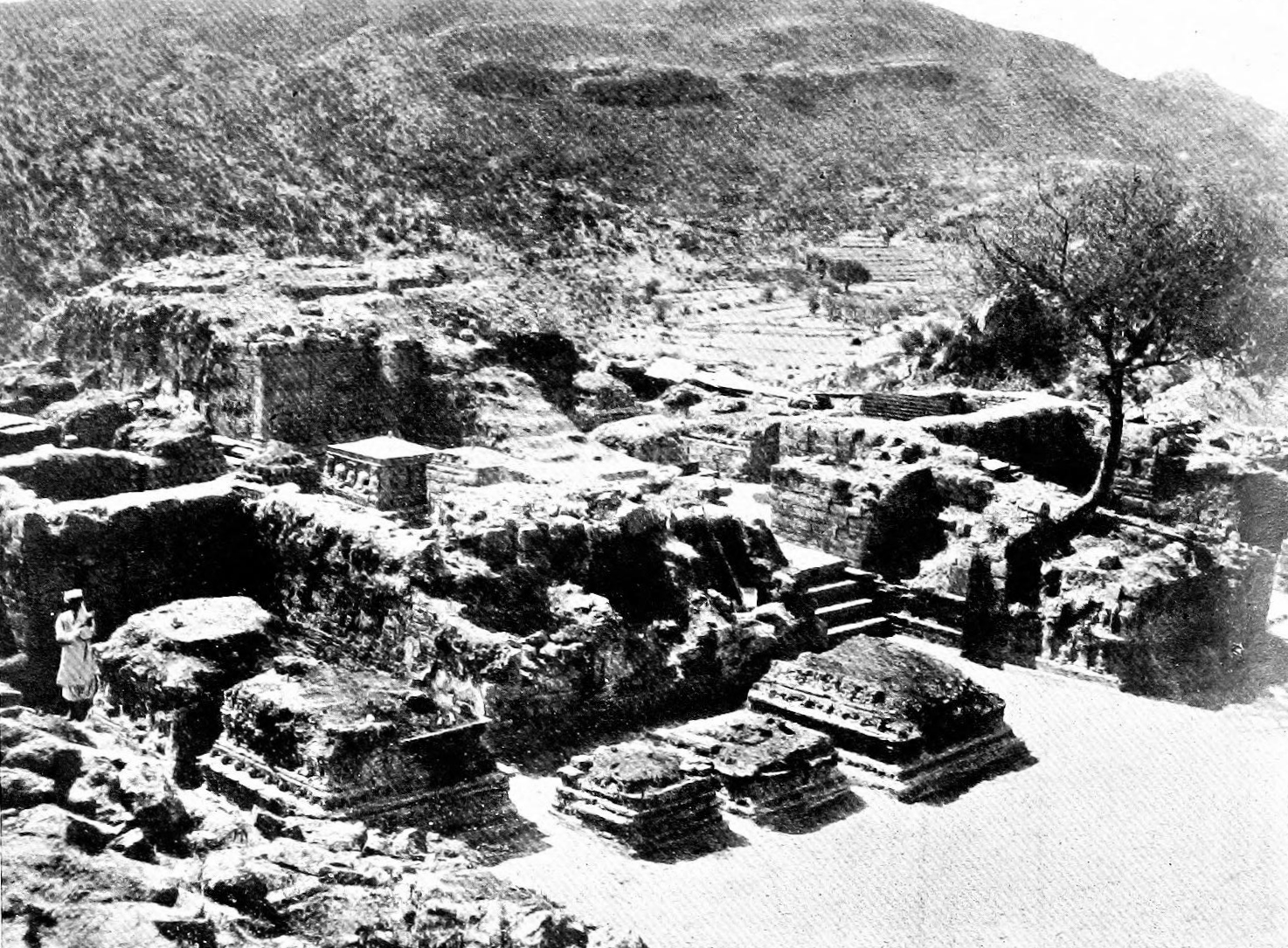
Remains of the main Stupa, and small peripheral Stupas

The main stupa at Jaulian was much smaller than that of Mohra Muradu or the Dharmarajika Stupa, and is badly damaged. It was extensively coated in stucco plaster, as are almost all the sculptures and architectural details. Despite the use of an easily moldable material, the quality of decoration at Jaulian is considered to be less impressive than that of Mohra Muradu. The original plaster is preserved at some places.

The main stupa is surrounded by 21 smaller "votive stupas" that contained religious iconography – though some posit that some of the votive stupas were actually built as tombs for revered monks. The statues located in the votive stupas are mostly preserved; though a number of have been removed and are housed in museums.the original fabric of the main stupa itself which stands in the middle of the upper court

A statue of Buddha in a votive stupa with a hole in the navel was called the "Healing Buddha". Pilgrims would put their fingers in the icon's navel, and pray for cures of various ailment. A 5th century inscription preserved under the statue shows that it was given by a friar Budhamitra Dharmanandin.

=== Monastery ===
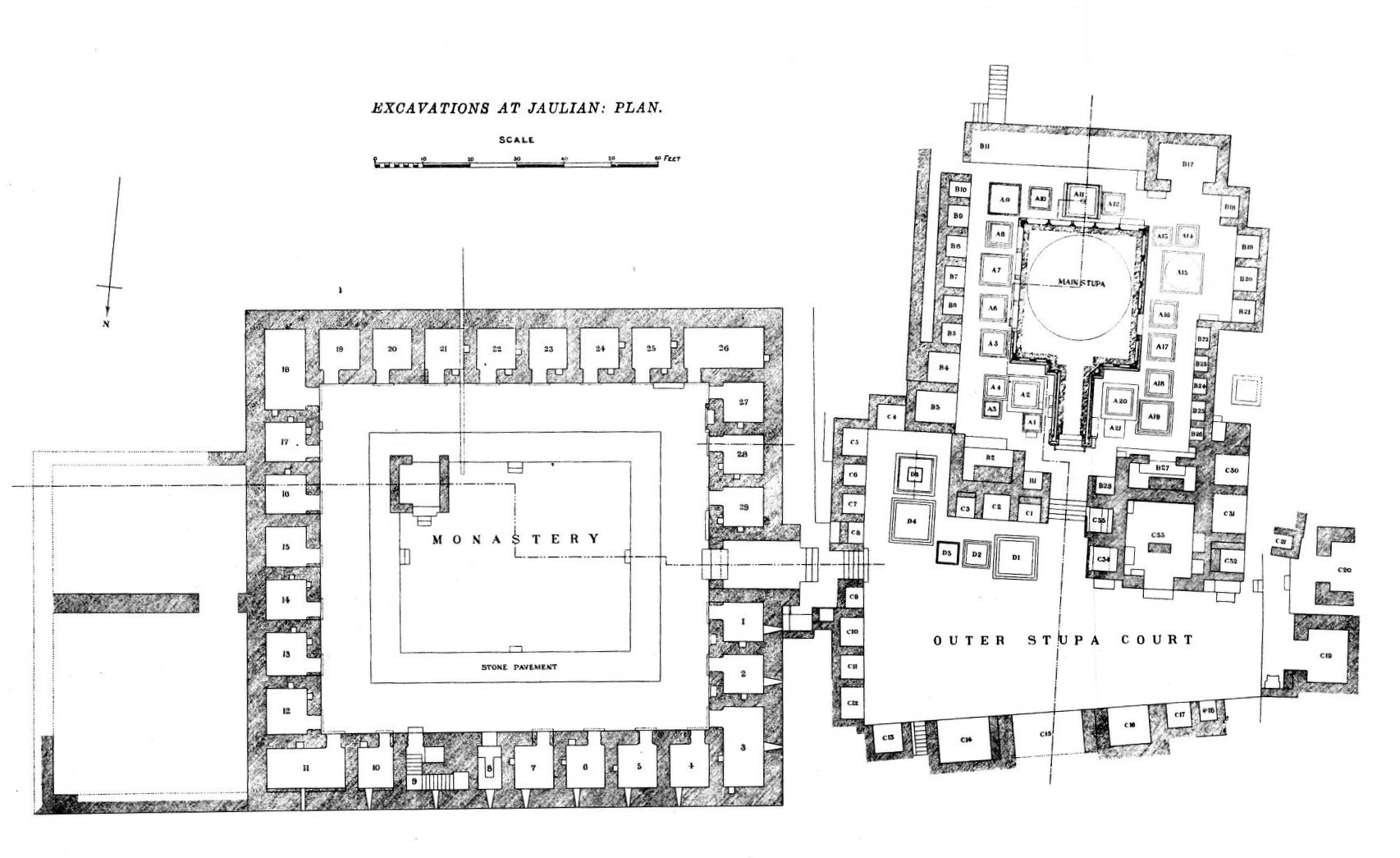
Map of the Jaulian monastery and stupa area

The monastery at Jaulian is similar to that of nearby Mohra Muradu. Jaulian monastery was a two-level building that contained 28 students' rooms on the first floor, and 28 more on the second floor. The two levels are connected by stone stairs which are still preserved. Some of the rooms contain preserved statues of the Buddha. Each room had a niche to hold lamps, and a window offering a source of fresh air and natural light. The windows were designed to be narrower at the outer edge, of and larger at the inner edge in order guard against wild animals. The rooms were plastered and decorated with plasterwork and paintings.

As was common at other large monasteries in the Gandhara region such as Takht-i-Bahi and Dharmarajika, a section of the monastery was set aside specifically for the production of Buddhist manuscripts, typically on birch bark, a highly perishable material.

The monastery further contained a large pool that was used for washing, and a kitchen. A stone for grinding spices is well- preserved at the site, as well as two stone mills that were used to grind grains.

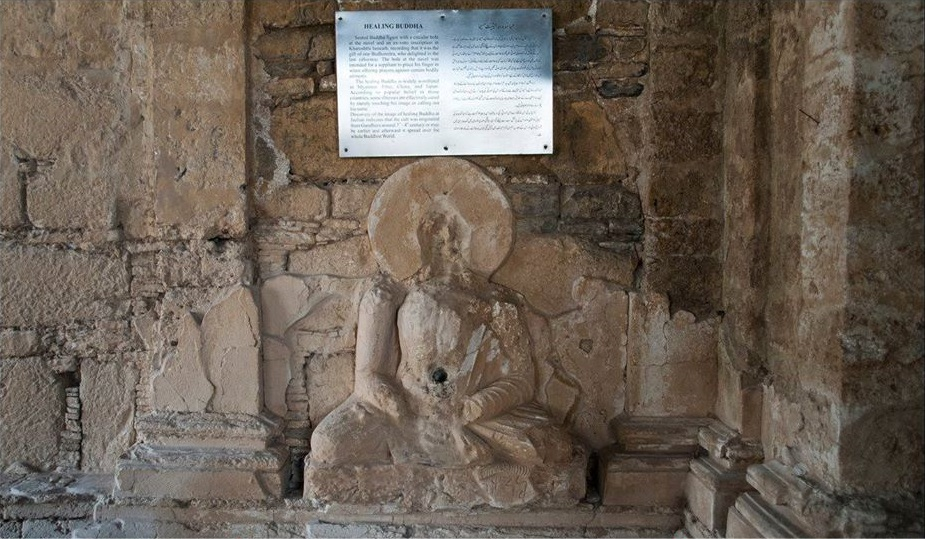
A statue of Buddha (at Jaulian) with a hole in the navel is an odd artifact. It is called the "Healing Buddha". Buddhist pilgrims put their fingers in the navel hole and pray for the ailment of the patients.

== Gallery ==
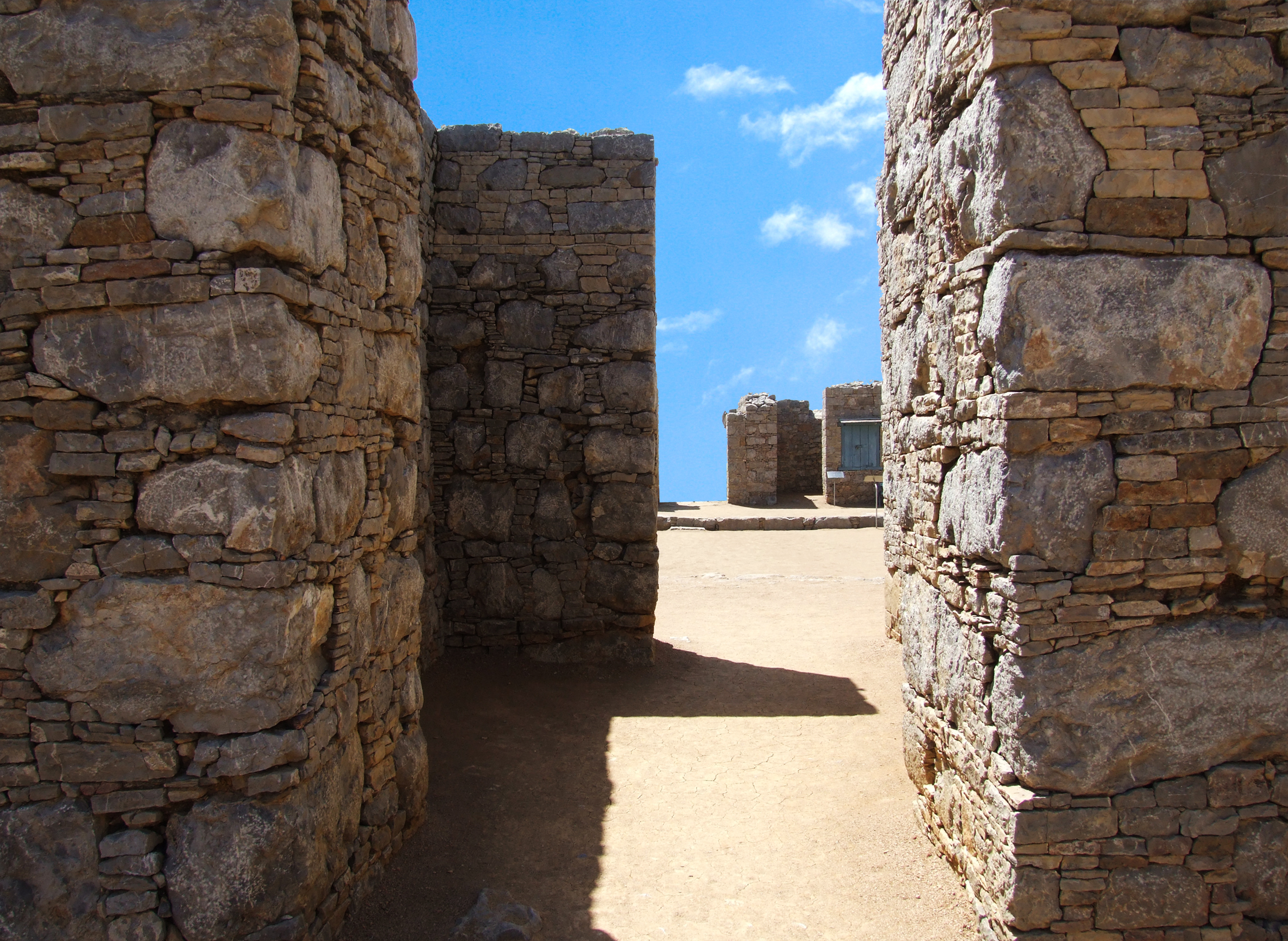
A view of the Jaulian ruins

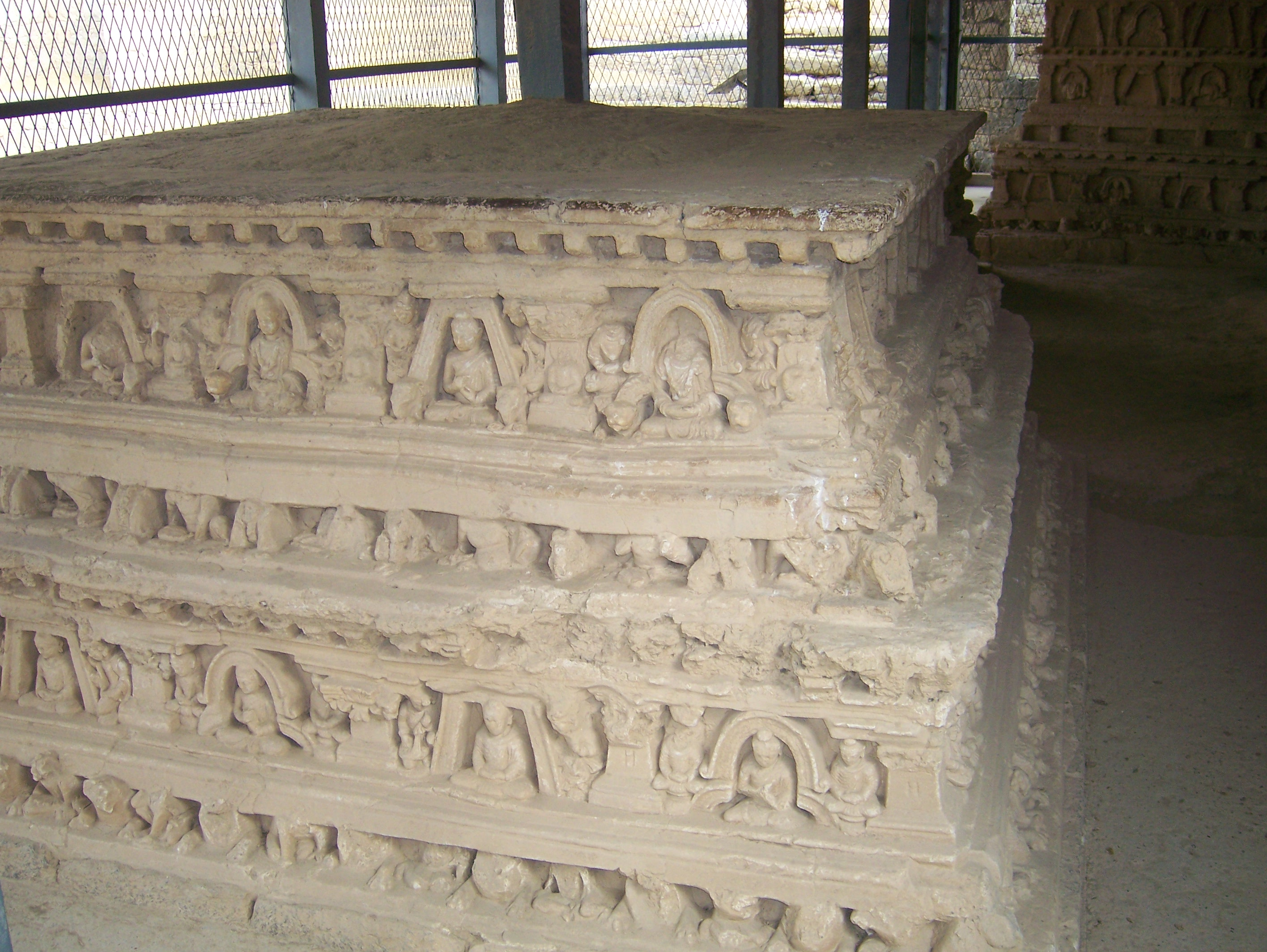
A votive Stupa at Jaulian

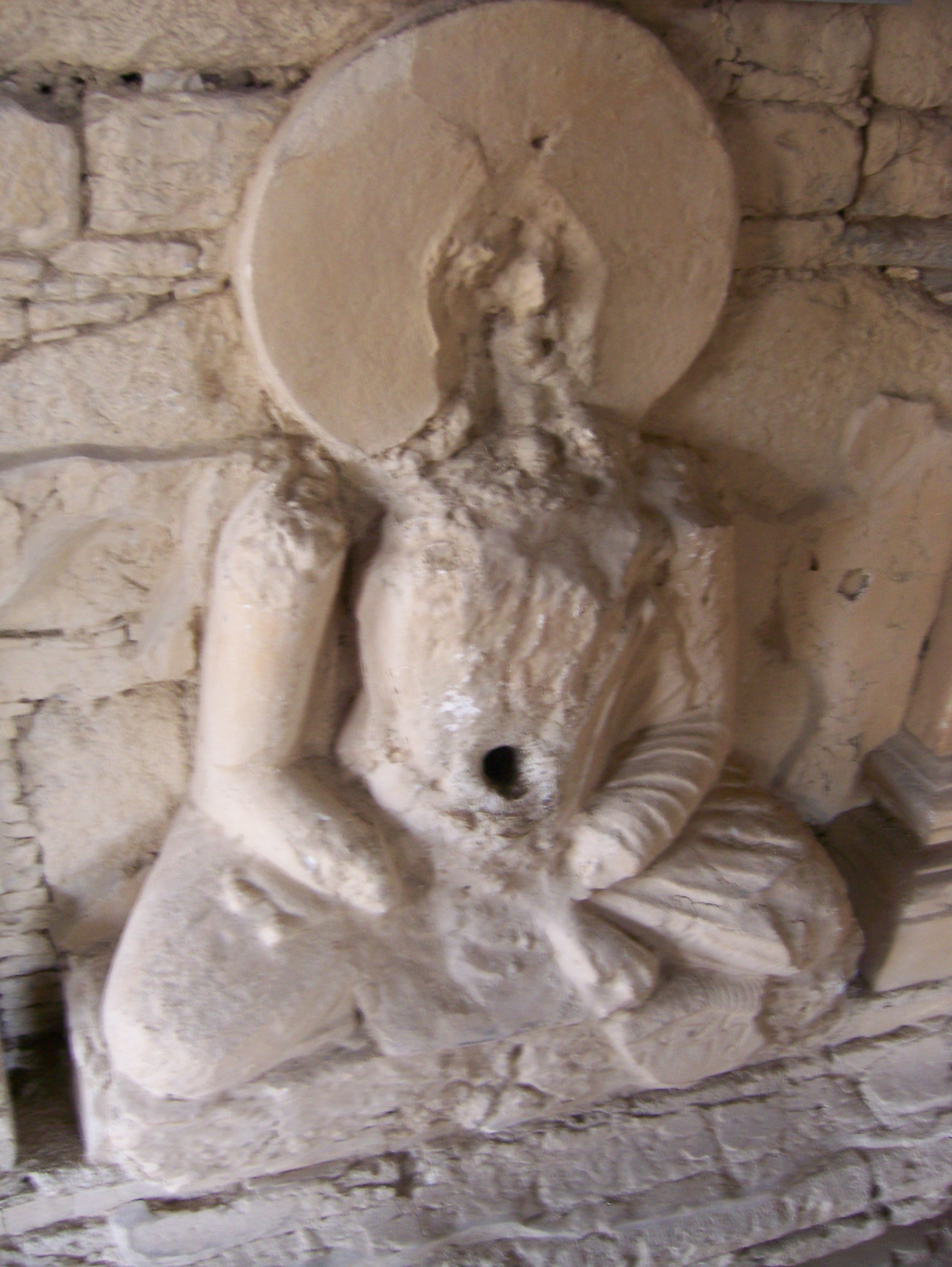
"Healing Buddha," Buddha with a navel hole

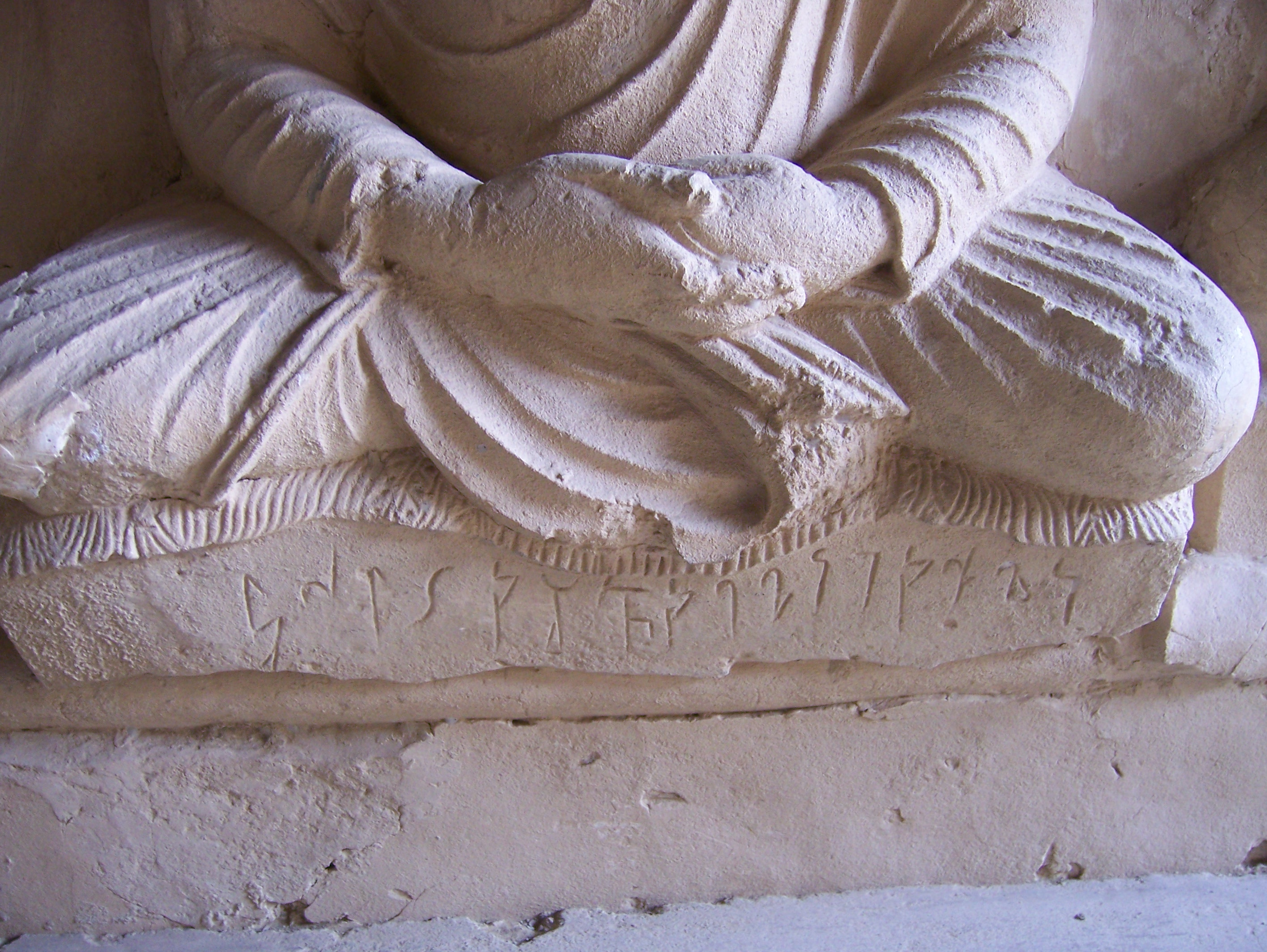
An inscription under a statue at Jaulian

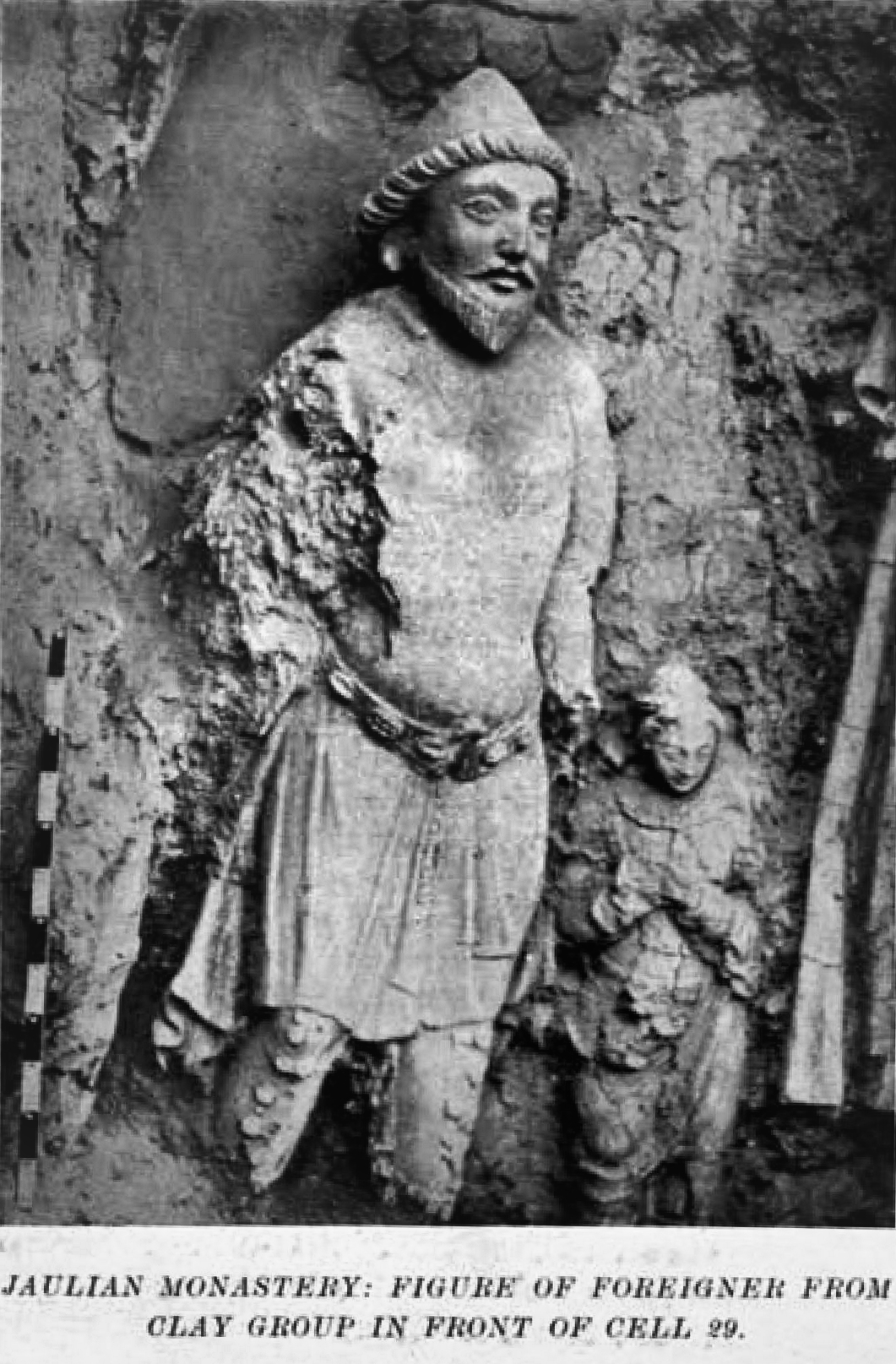
Devotee in foreign dress (Indo-Scythian)

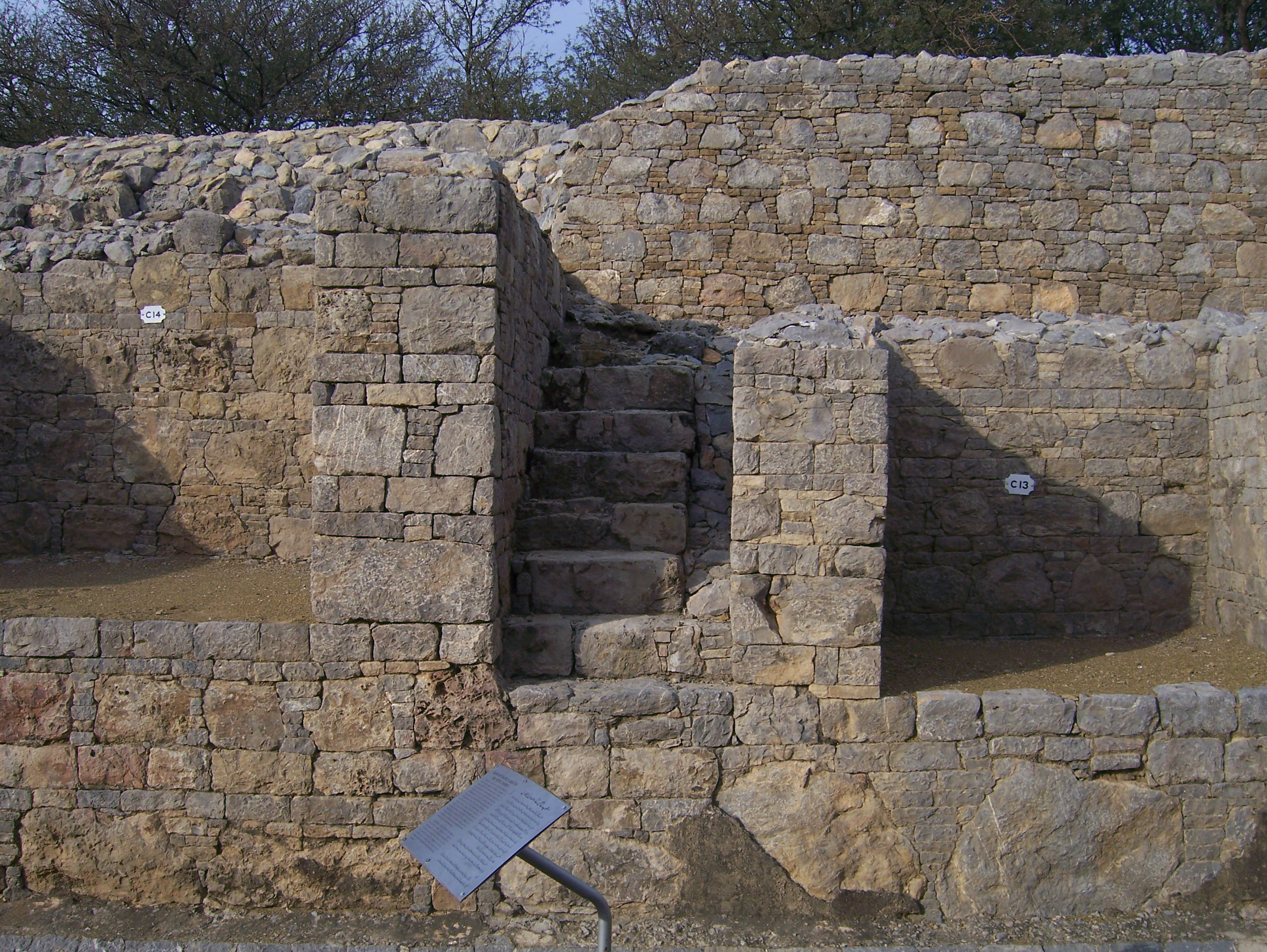
Stairs to the second floor

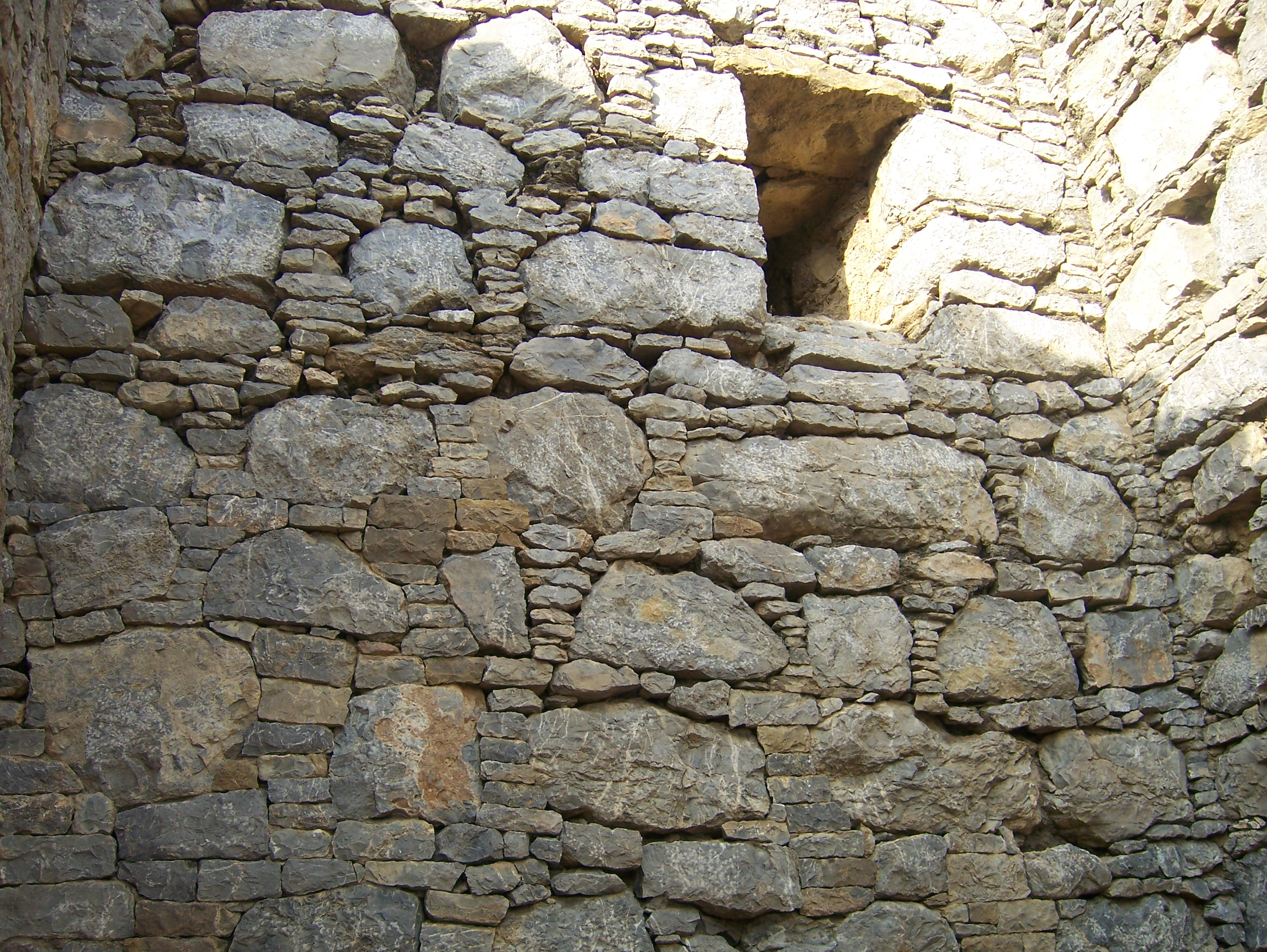
The window of a students room

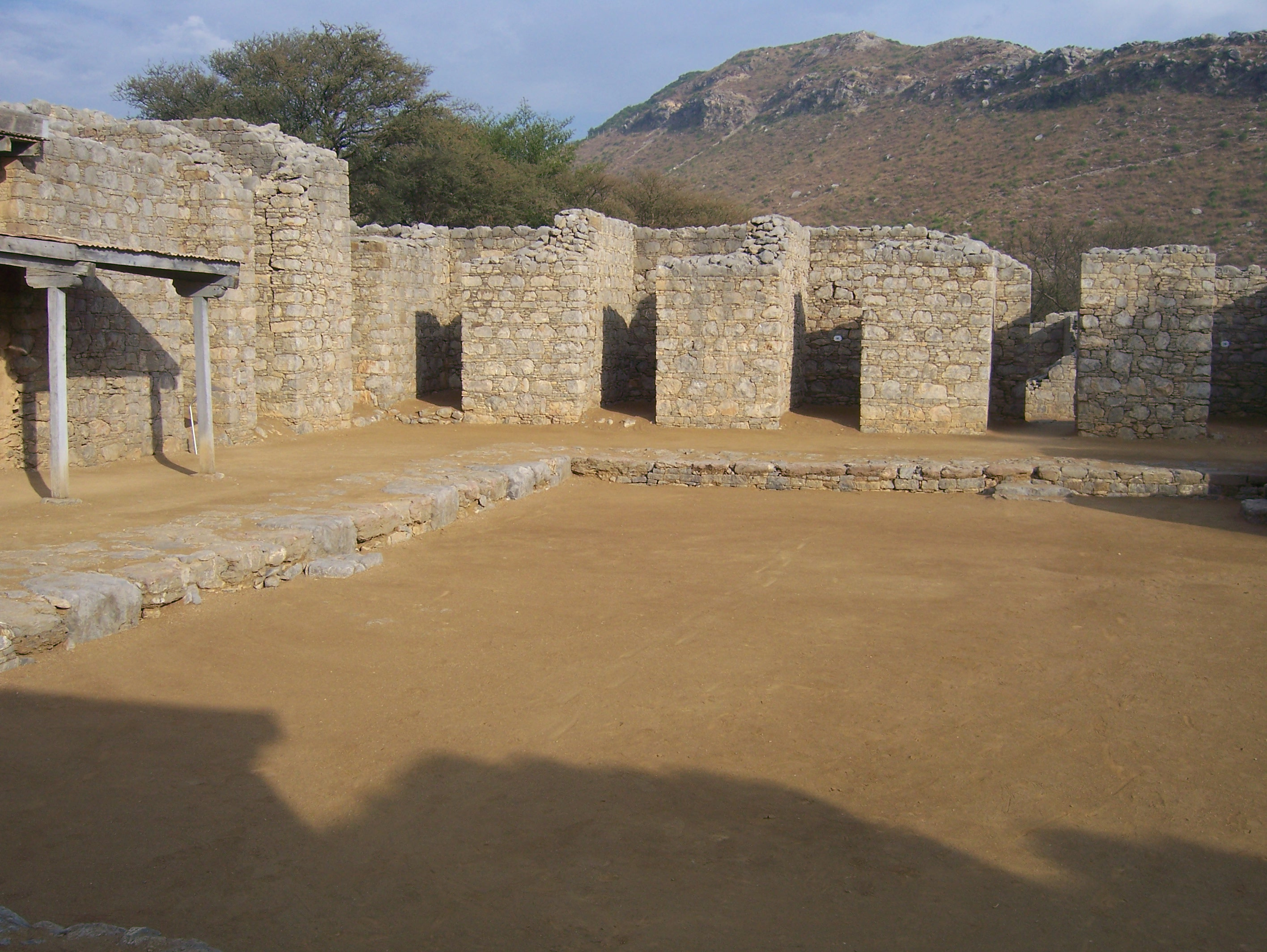
The pool for ritual washings

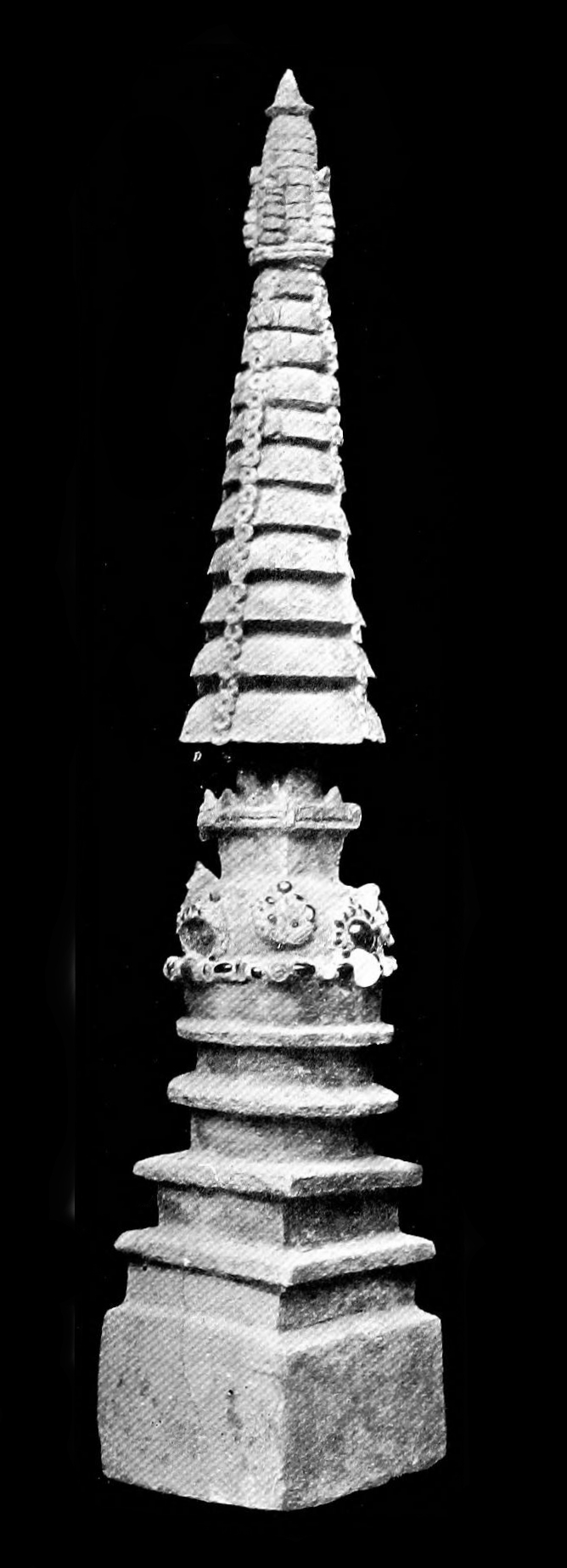
Stupa-shaped reliquary from Jaulian

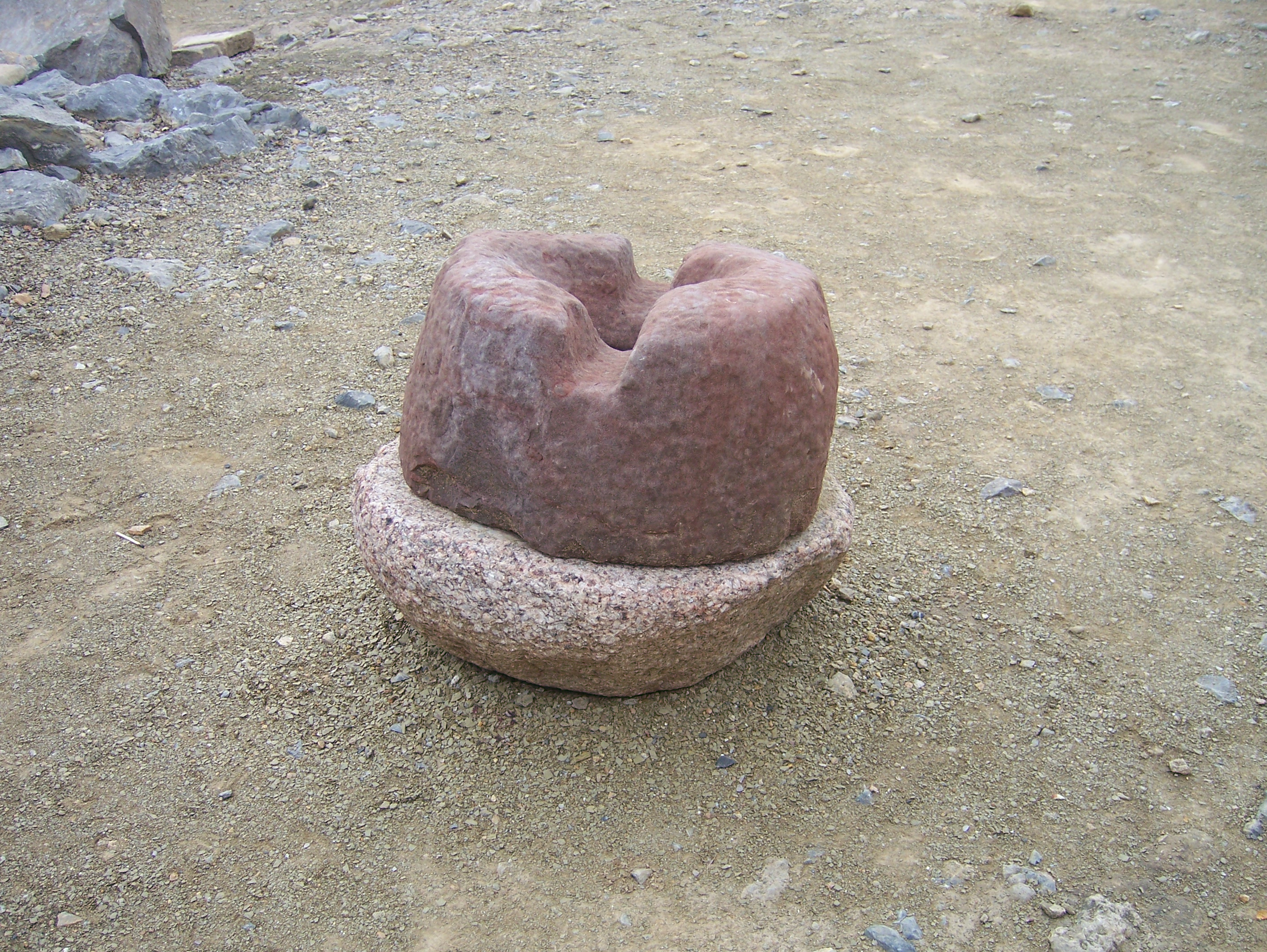
A mill for grinding grains

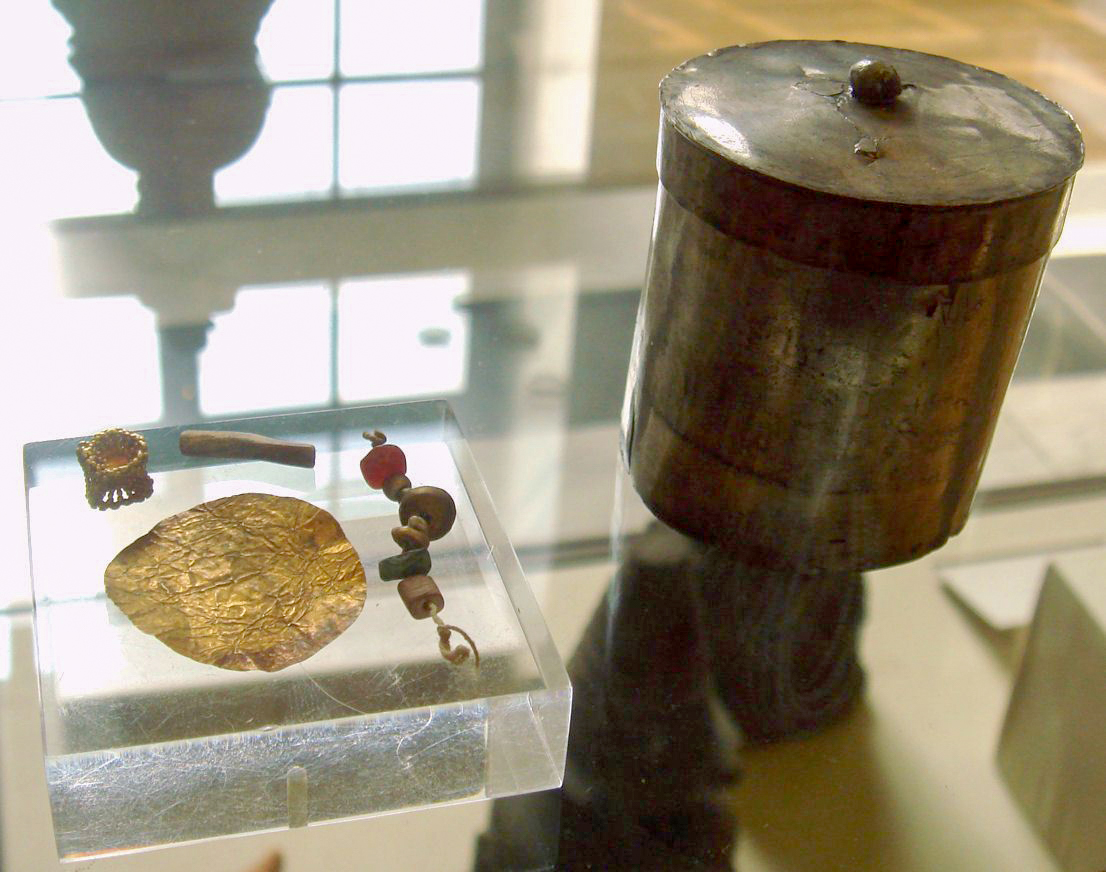
A silver reliquary recovered from Jaulian, now on display at the British Museum

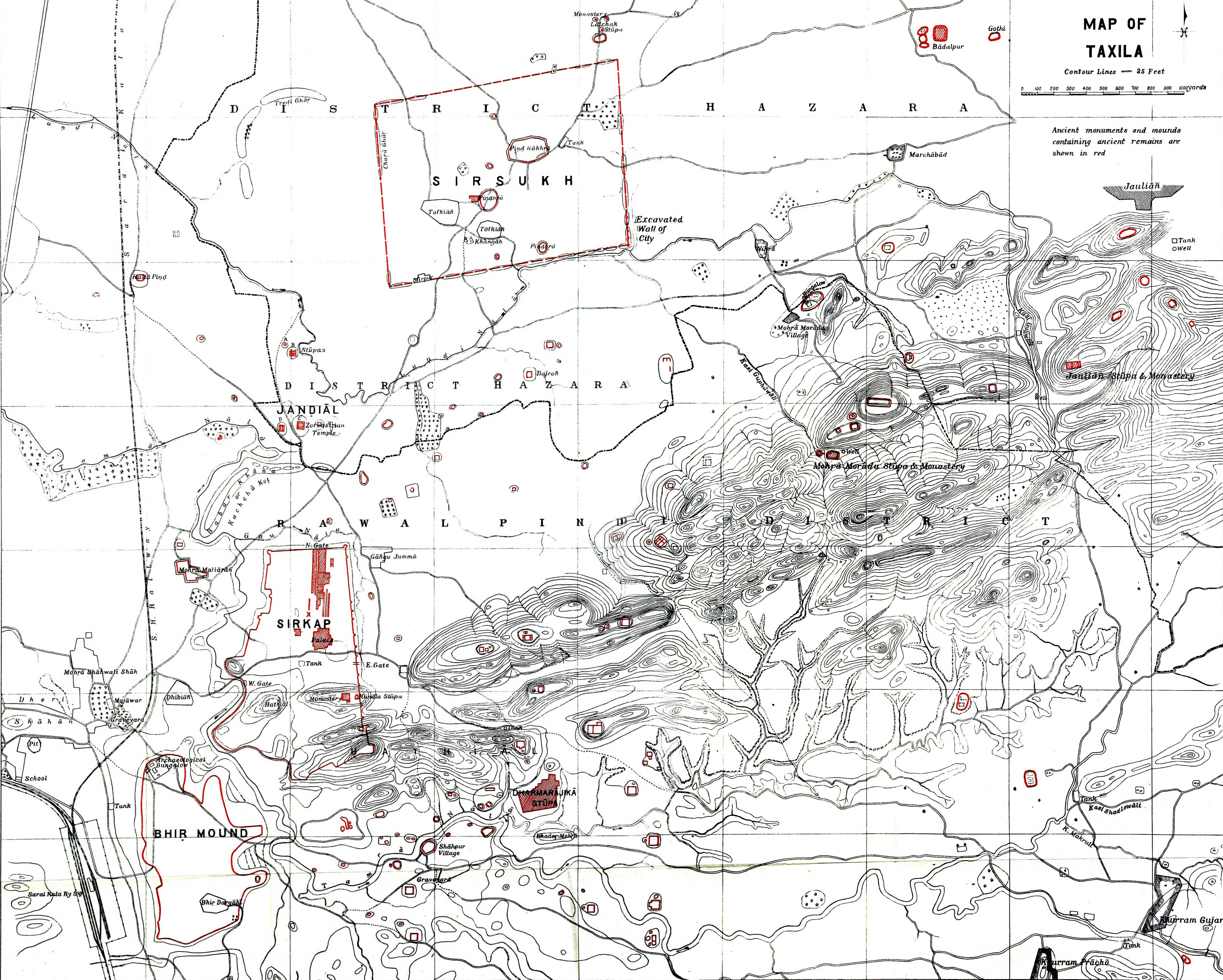
Jaulian is located to the northeast of Sirkap

== See also ==
- List of archaeological sites and monuments in Khyber Pakhtunkhwa
