= Mohra Muradu =

2nd century ancient ruins of Buddhist stupa and monastery

Mohra Muradu موہرا مرادو
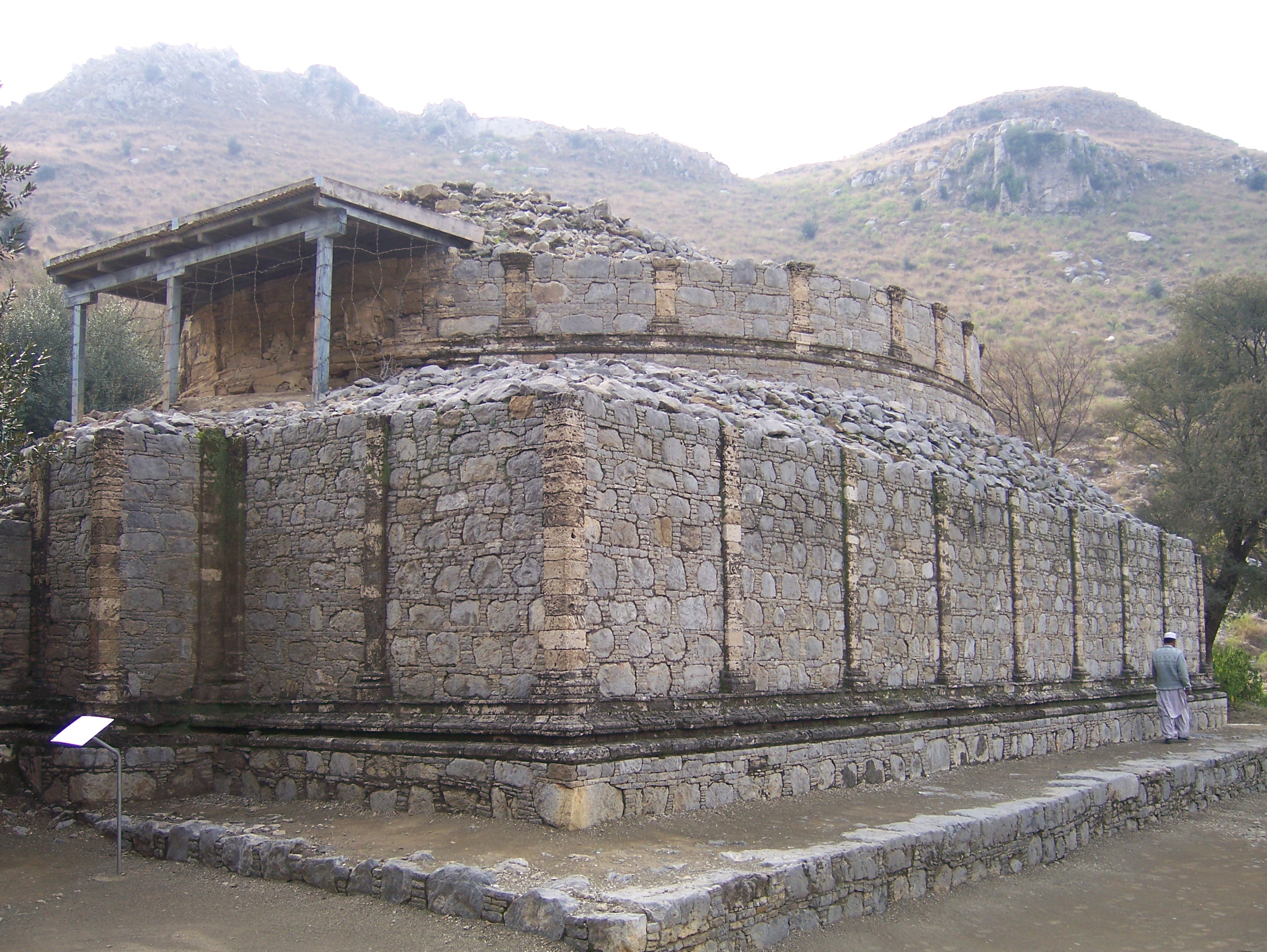
- The main Stupa at Mohra Muradu monastery at Taxila, Pakistan.

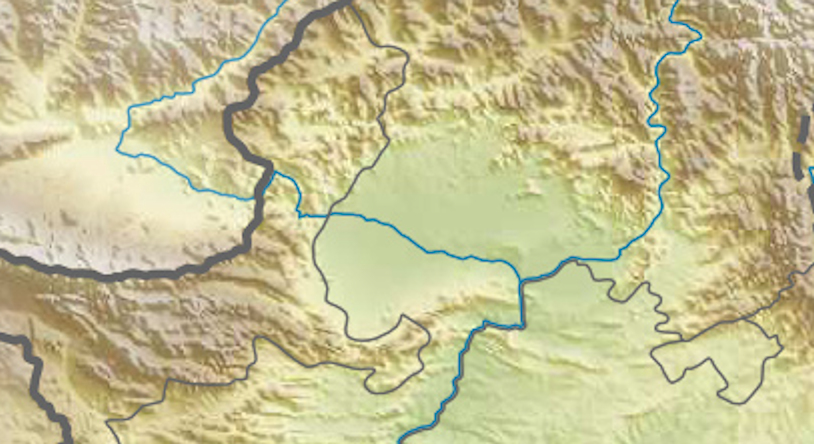
- Location within Pakistan Location within Gandhara
- 33.760821°N 72.860635°E
- Type: Stupa and monastery
- Location: Taxila, Pakistan

Site notes
- Archaeologists: Sir John Marshall

UNESCO World Heritage Site
- Official name: Taxila
- Criteria: iii, iv
- Designated: 1980
- Reference no.: 139

Mohra Muradu (Urdu: موہرا مرادو) is the place of an ancient Buddhist stupa and monastery near the ruins of Taxila, in the Punjab province of Pakistan. The ancient monastery is located in a valley and has views of the surrounding mountains. The monks could meditate in all stillness at this place but were near enough to the city of Sirsukh to go for begging as it is only around 1.5 km away. The city is said to have been built the 2nd century CE and renovated in the 5th century.

The ruins consist of three distinct parts, which include the main stupa, a votive stupa and the monastery and have been included in the world heritage list of the UNESCO since 1980 under Taxila.

== Excavation ==
The ruins of Mohra Muradu were excavated under the supervision of Sir John Marshall by Abdul Qadir in 1914-1915. They consist of a Buddhistic monastery and two stupas. The main stupa is built on a foundation more than 4.75 meters high. The smaller, votive, stupa lies behind the bigger one.

== Monastery ==
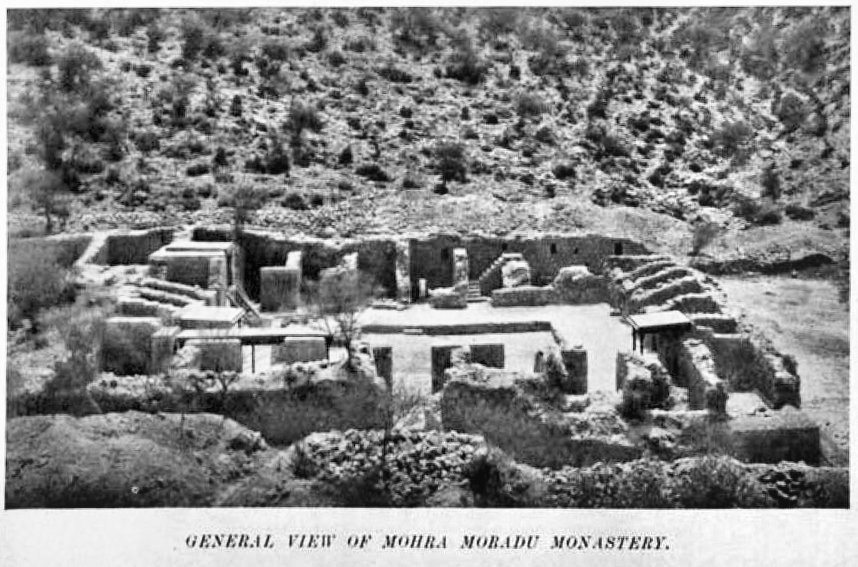
The monastery.

The monastery consists of 27 rooms for the students and the teachers built around a courtyard with a pool. The large, square shaped pool contained water for ritual washings and was about half a metre deep. Stairs to the pool were present on all sides. The monastery also contained a kitchen and a well for water that still functions today. The rain water was collected into the pool from the roof of the monastery over wooden extensions. Statues of Buddha are found abundantly in the courtyard and the rooms for the students. An assembly hall is also present in one corner of the monastery.

The monastery was a double story building. Stairs to the upper story went through one of the rooms. There was additional connection through wooden constructions from the courtyard. The strength of the walls has, however, led to the idea that there might have existed even a third story.

== Monumental votive stupa ==
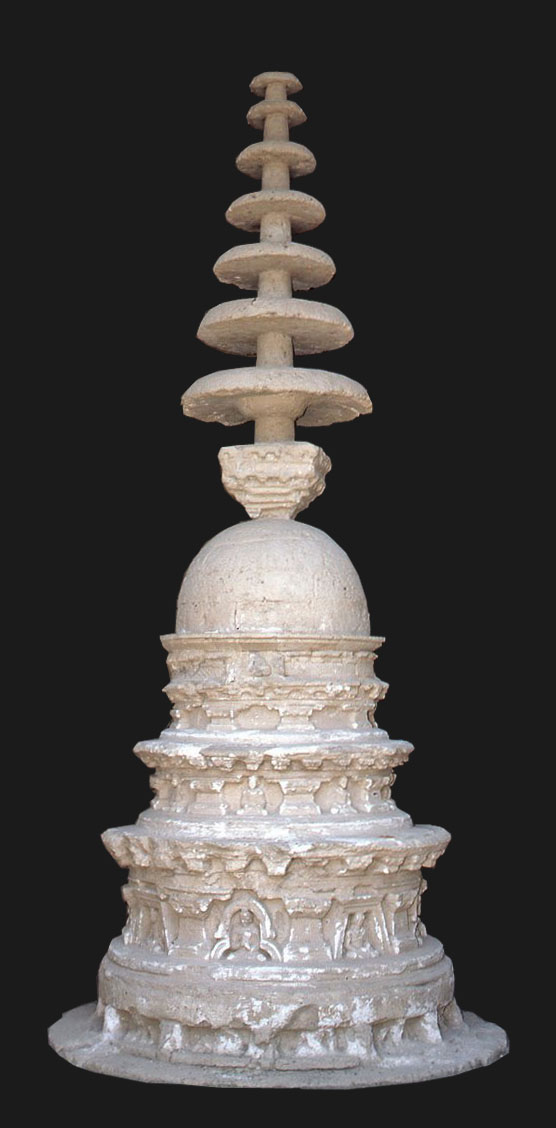
The monumental votive stupa in the monastery.

The monument is found in one of the rooms of the monastery. It was probably dedicated to the memory of one of the teachers who used to live in the room where it is located. The umbrellas were once colored and the monument is about 4 meters high.

== Gallery ==
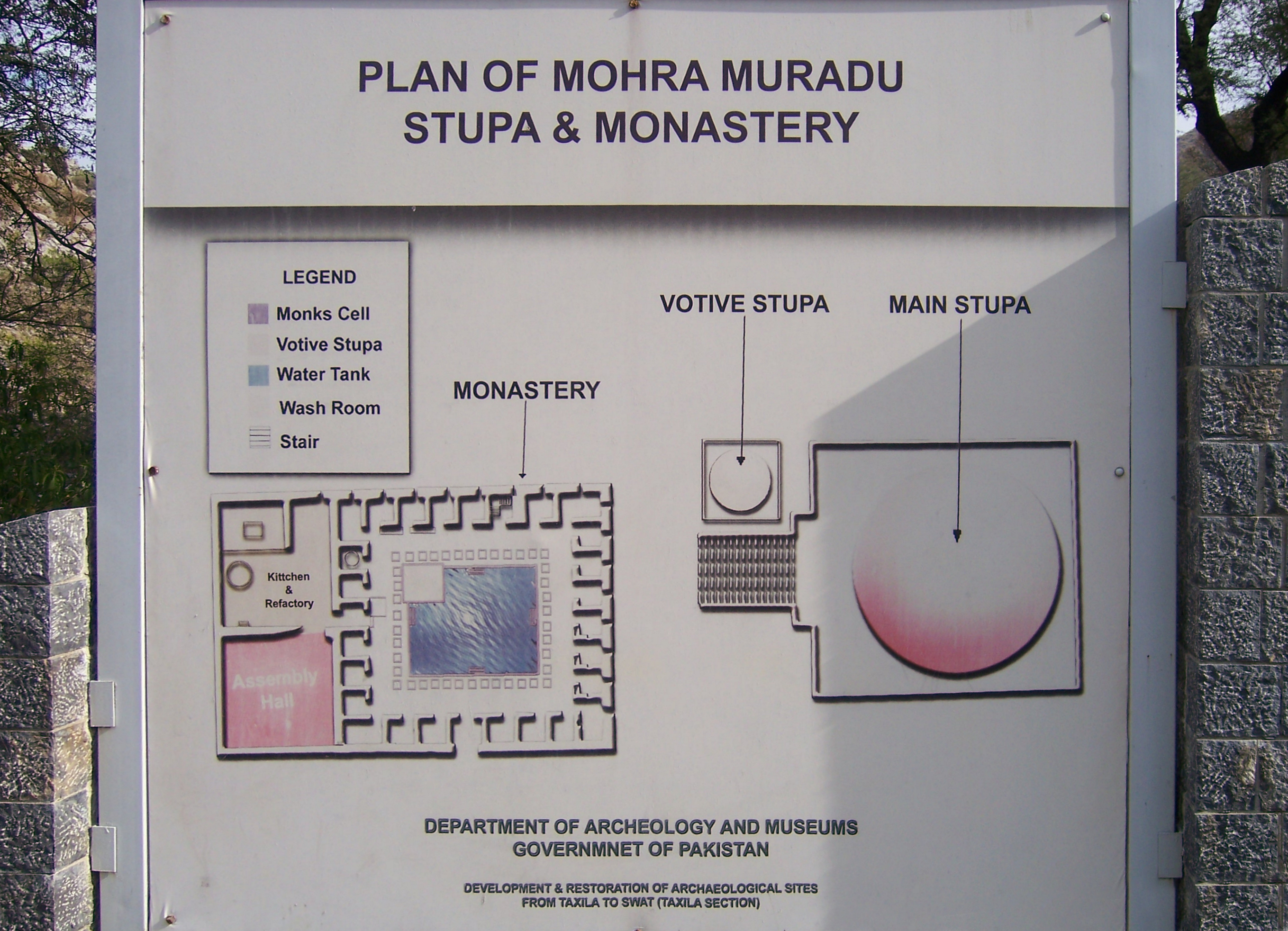
Plan of the ruins of Mohra Muradu at Taxila, Pakistan.

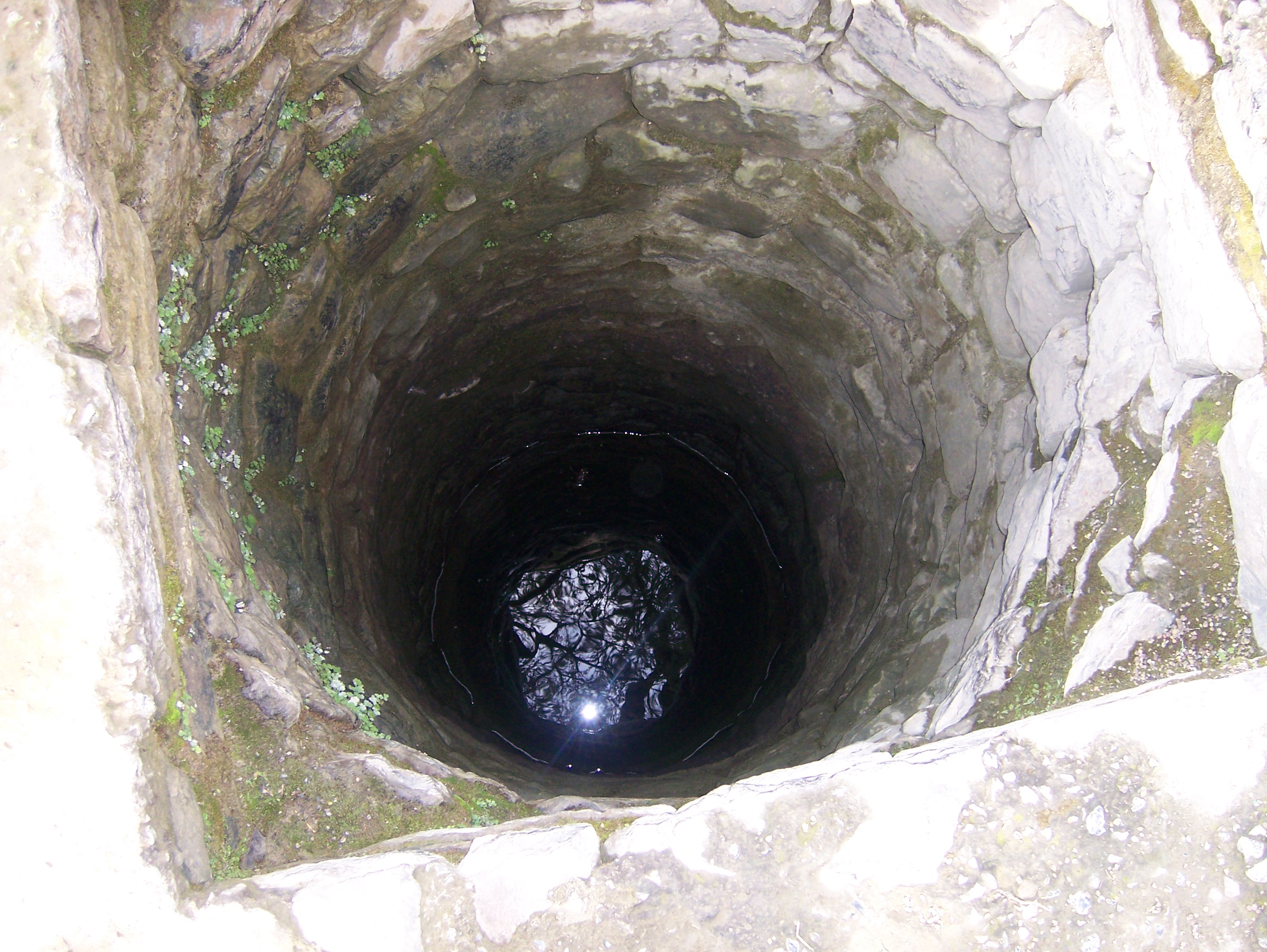
The well of Mohra Muradu, which is still in use.

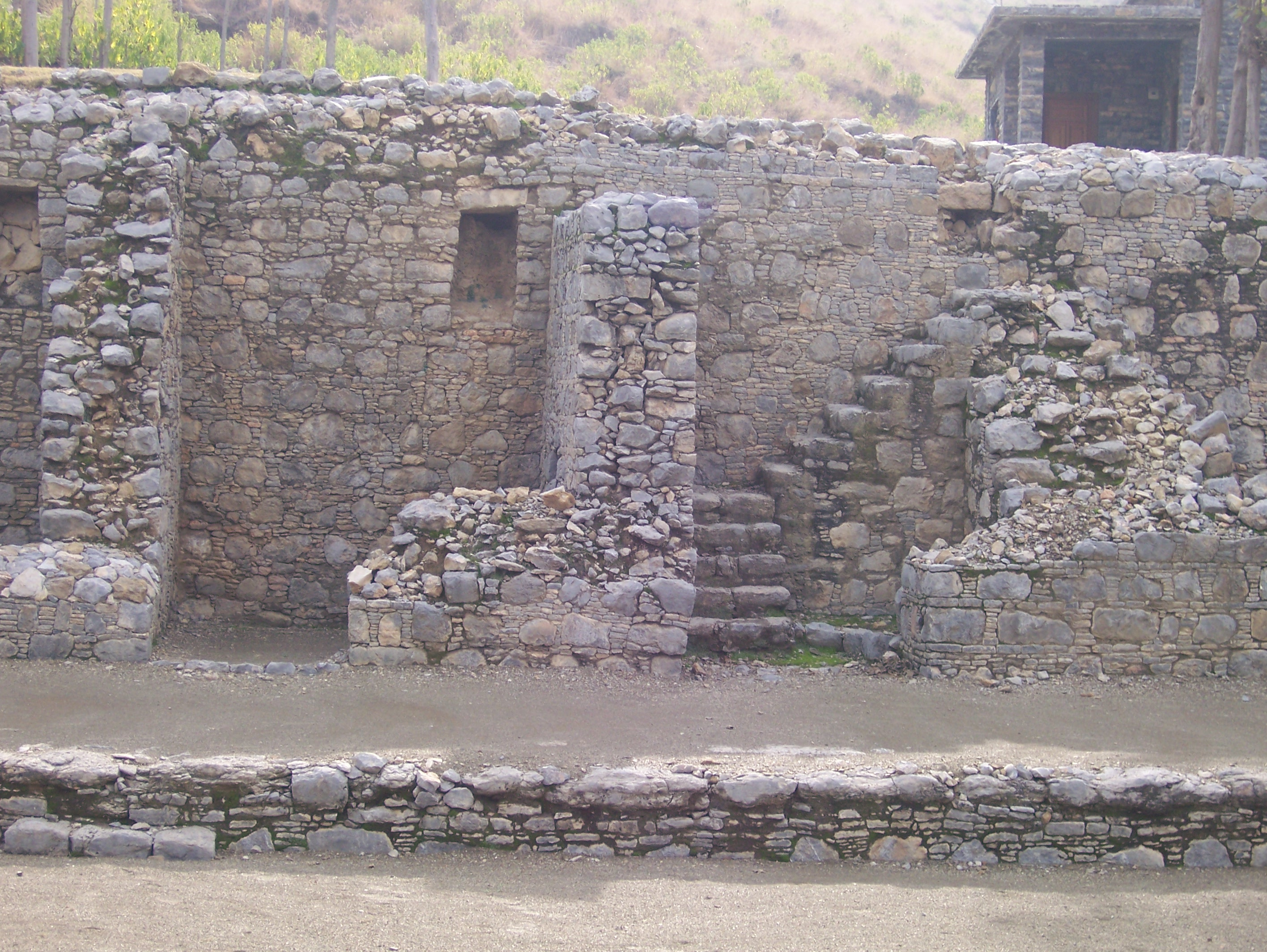
Stairs to the second floor.

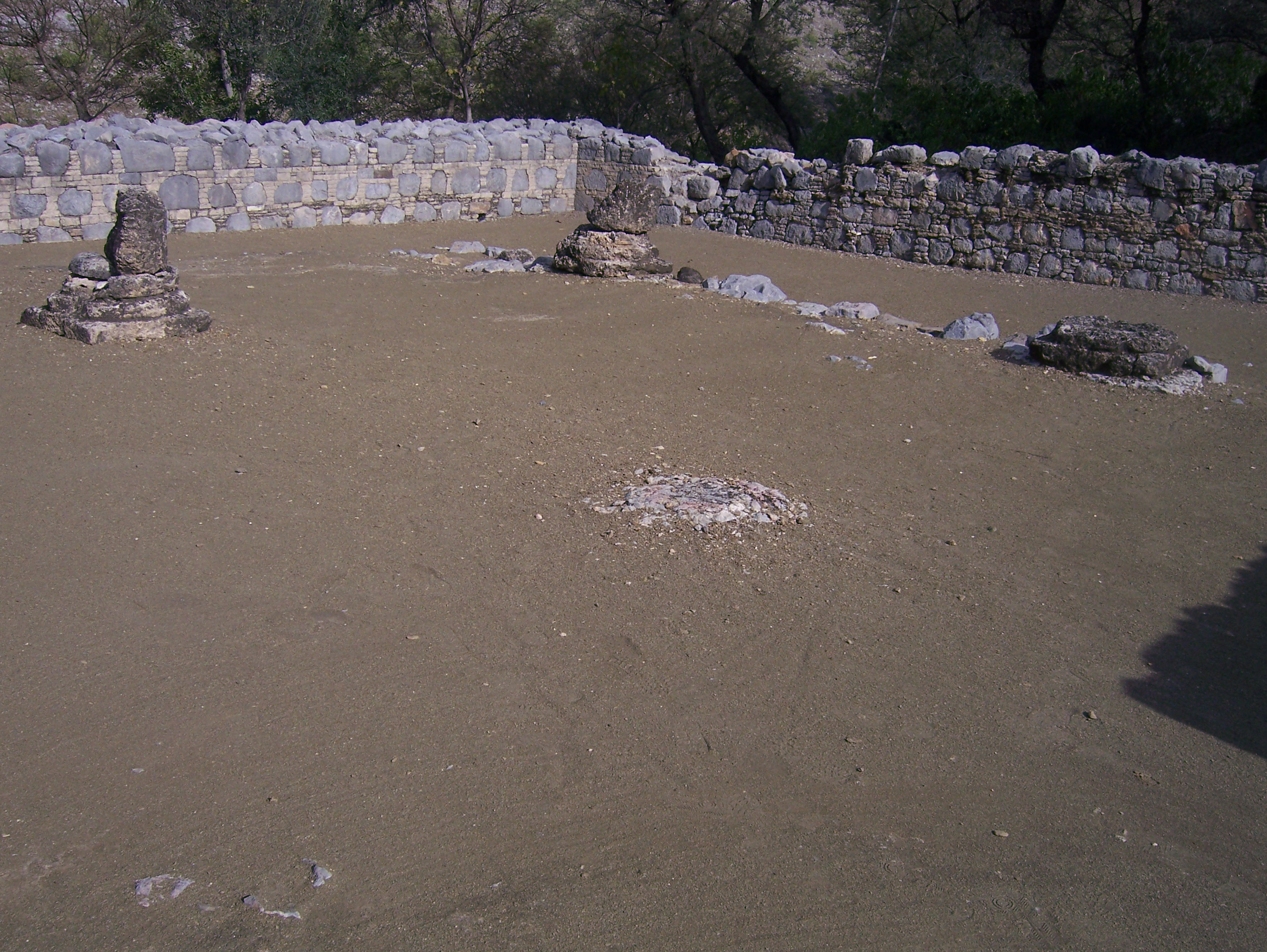
The assembly hall of the monastery. The bases of the supporting columns are visible.

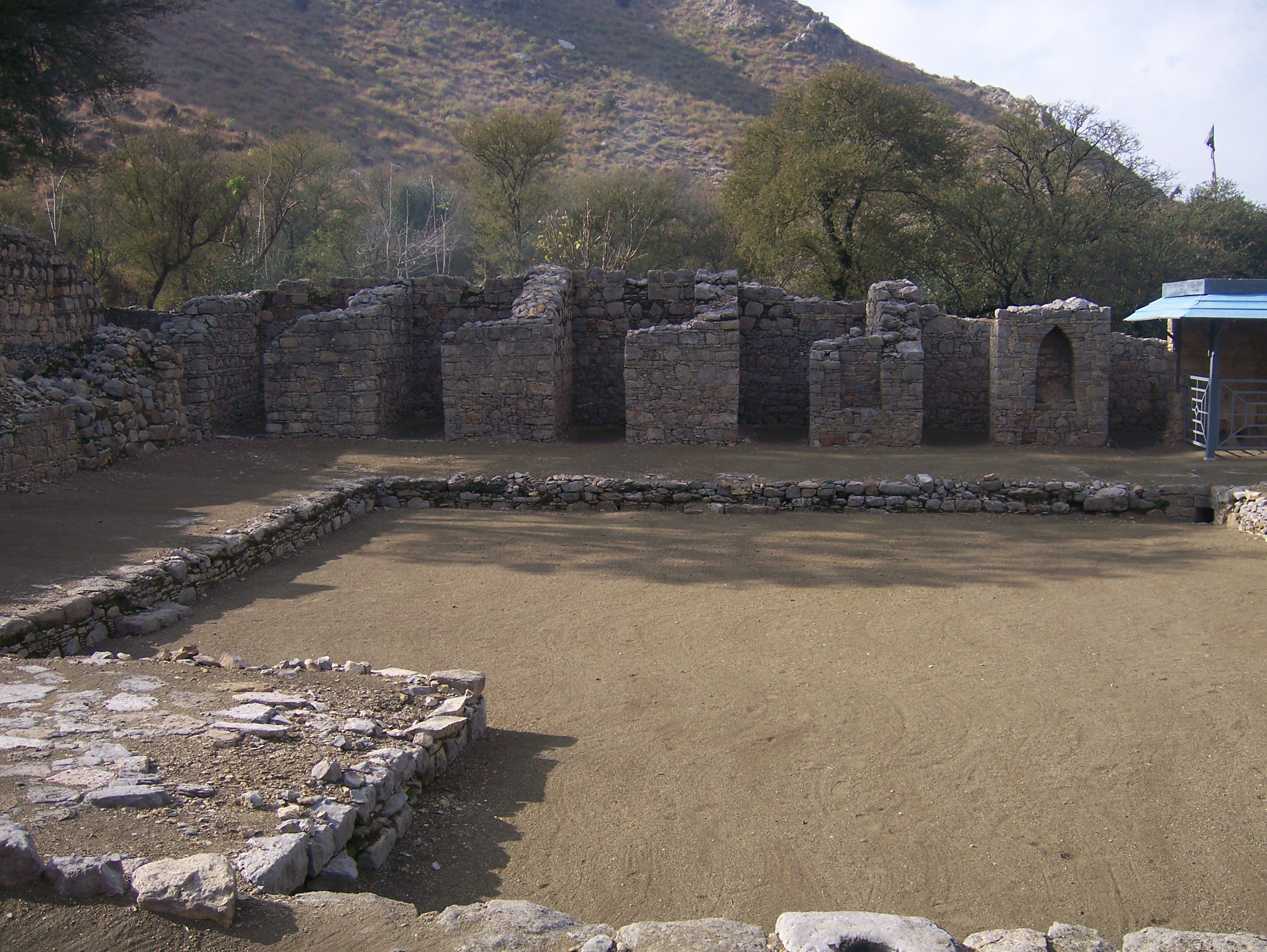
The pool at Mohra Muradu.

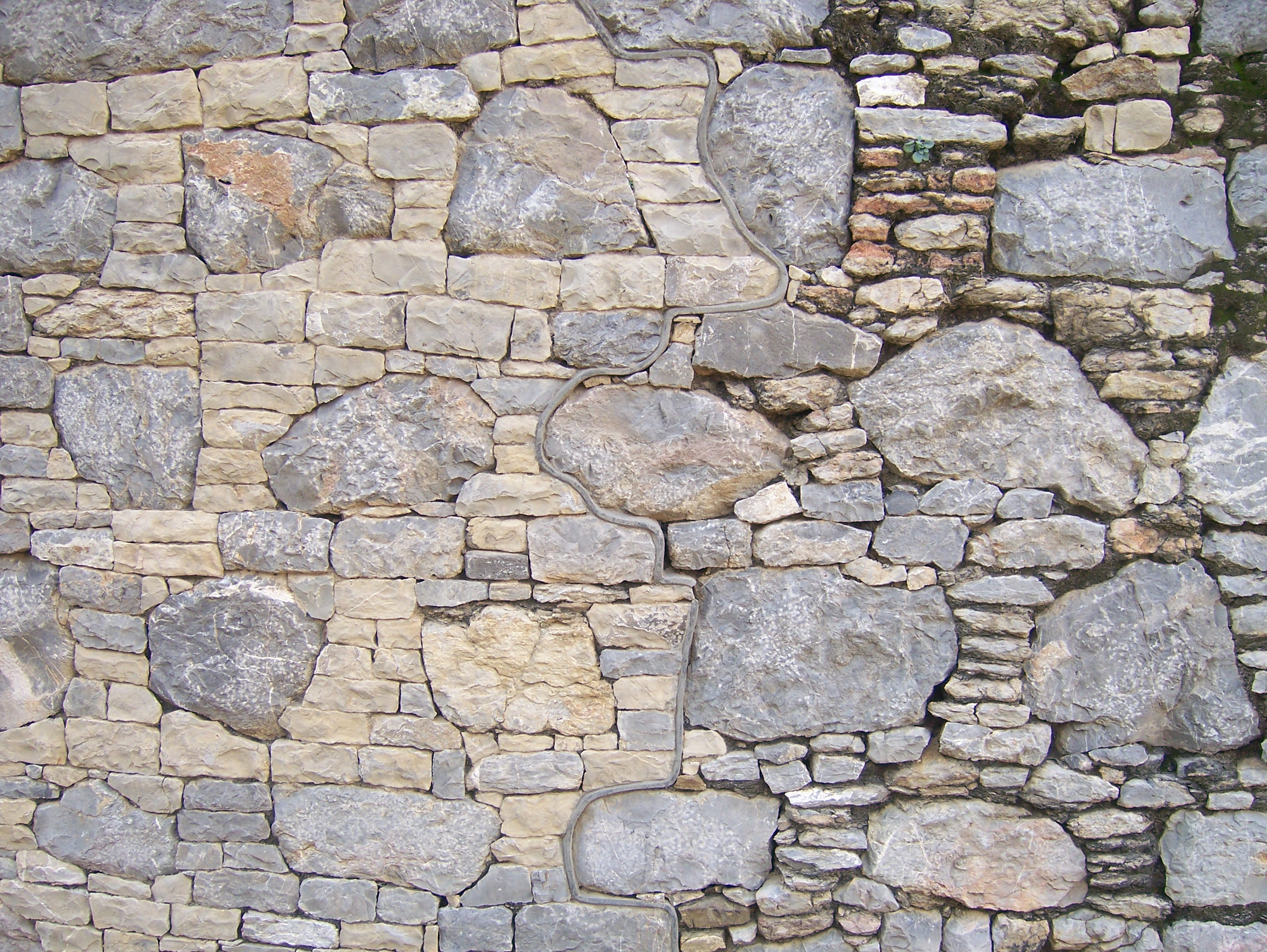
Wall of the monastery. The part to the right is original, whereas to the left is the restored part. The division between the two is clearly marked.

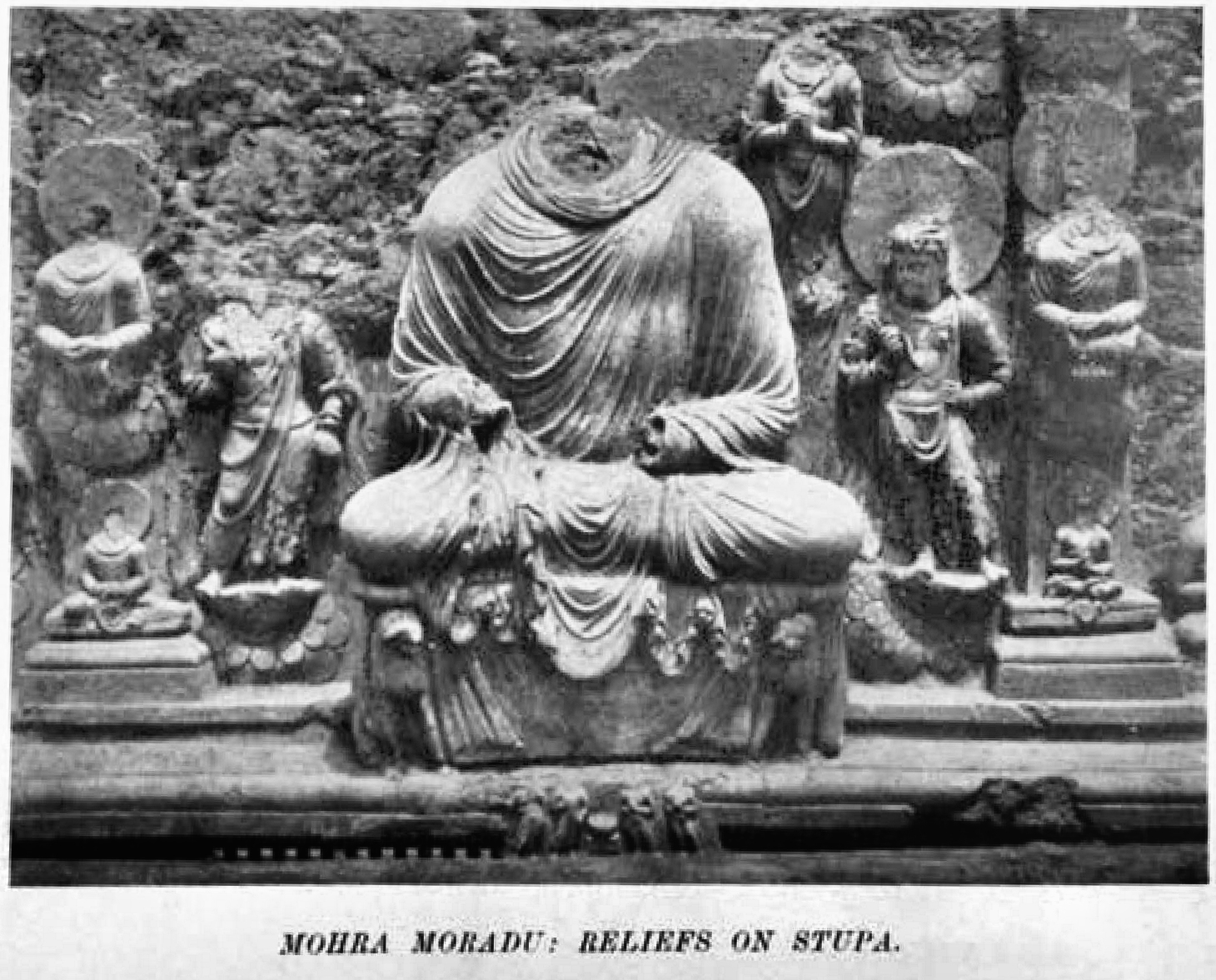
Reliefs.

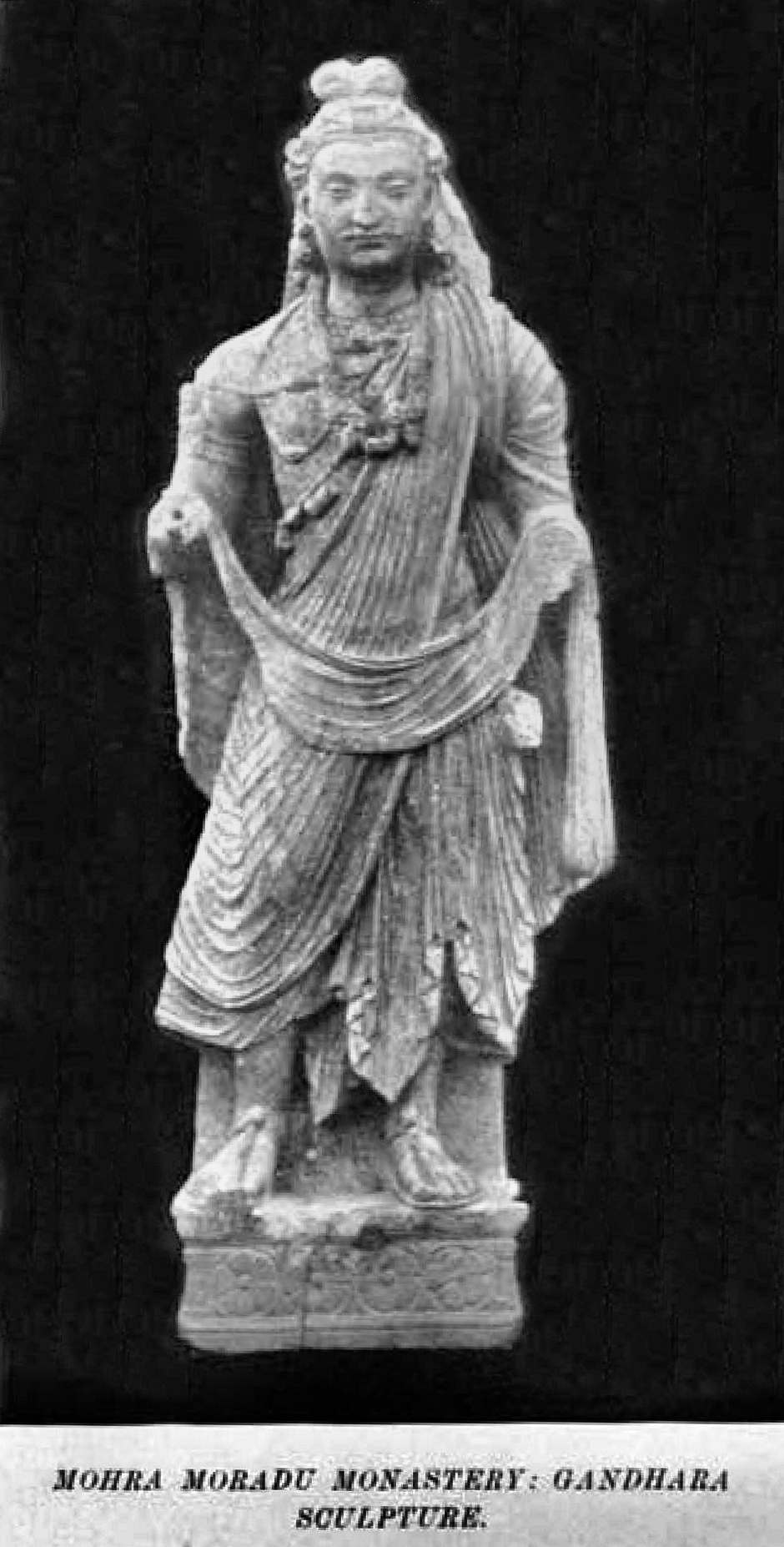
Bodhisattva.

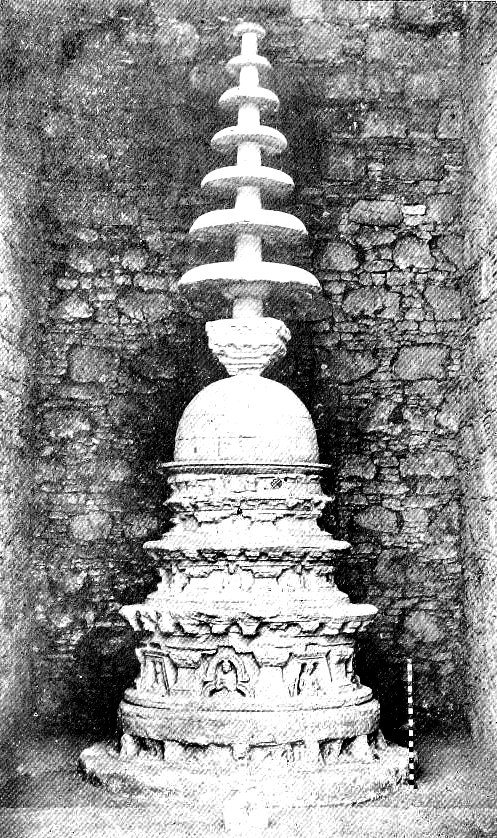
1918 photograph of the votive stupa.

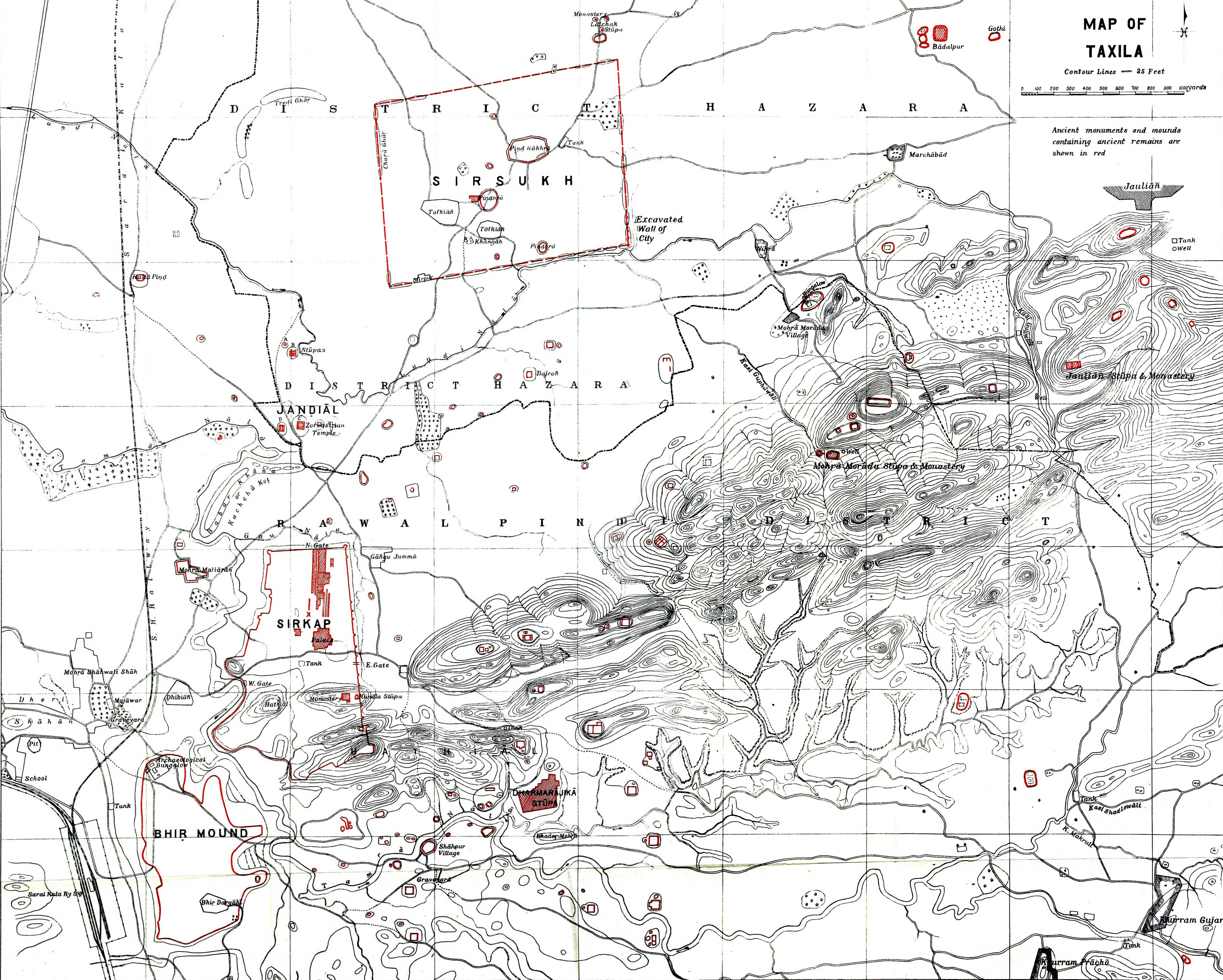
Mohra Muradu is located to the northeast of Sirkap.
