= Kunala Stupa =

Kushan-era Buddhist stupa and monastery in Taxila, Punjab, Pakistan

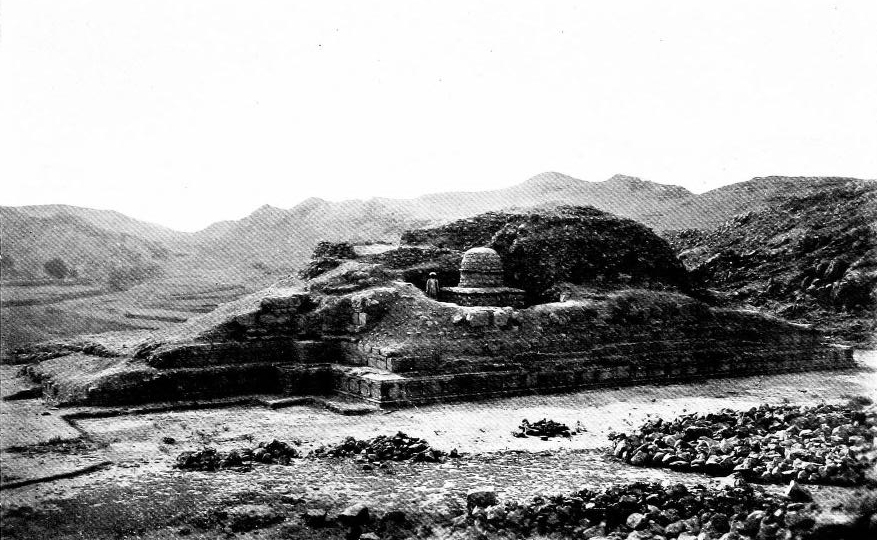
- Kunala Stupa circa 1910.

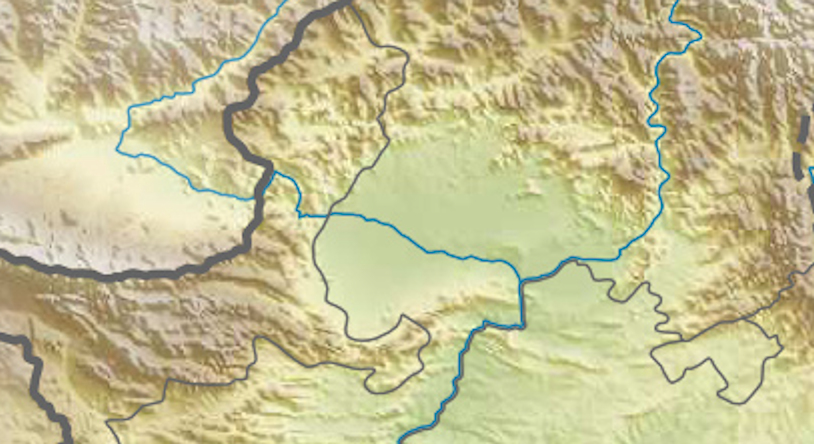
- Location within Pakistan Location within Gandhara

Religion
- Affiliation: Jainism
- Region: Gandhara
- Ecclesiastical or organizational status: Stupa ruins
- Year consecrated: 2nd century CE
- Status: Artifacts removed

Location
- Location: Pakistan
- Interactive map of Kunala Stupa
- Coordinates: 33.750424°N 72.830479°E

Kunala Stupa is a Kushan-era Jain stupa and monastery complex to the south-east of Taxila, on a hill about 200 meters just south of Sirkap, Punjab, Pakistan, thought to date to the 2nd century CE. It is located on a hill overlooking the ancient Indo-Greek city of Sirkap.

Emperor Samprati built a Jaina temple known as "Kunala Stupa" in honor of his father Kunala. During Samprati's rule, the extent of the wandering of Jaina monks developed multifold times, and later also included this region.

Its name come from Kunala, a son of Ashoka. Kunala, the legitimate heir to the throne had been blinded by one of Ashoka's queens, Tishyaksha, due to jealousy for his beautiful eyes. After years of wandering, Kunala reunited with his father Ashoka, and was treated by a doctor from Taxila.

Buddhist pilgrims with eye impairment came to the stupa with the hope of being cured.

The Kunala stupa was visited by the Chinese pilgrim Xuanzang, who wrote an account of it.

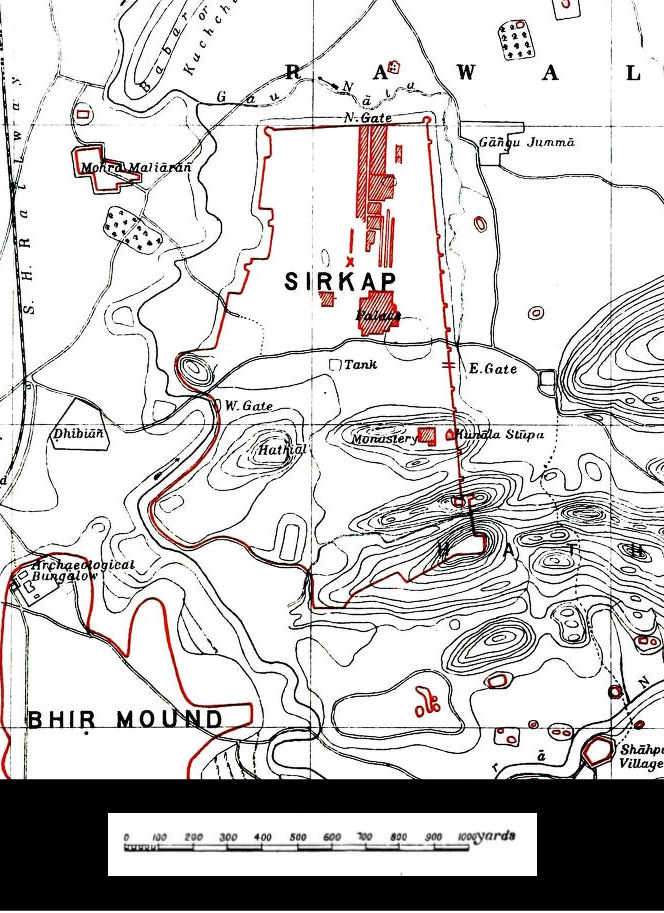
Kunala stupa and monastery are on the hill just south of Sirkap.
