= Taxila Museum =

Museum in Taxila, Pakistan

- ٹیکسلا عجائب گھر
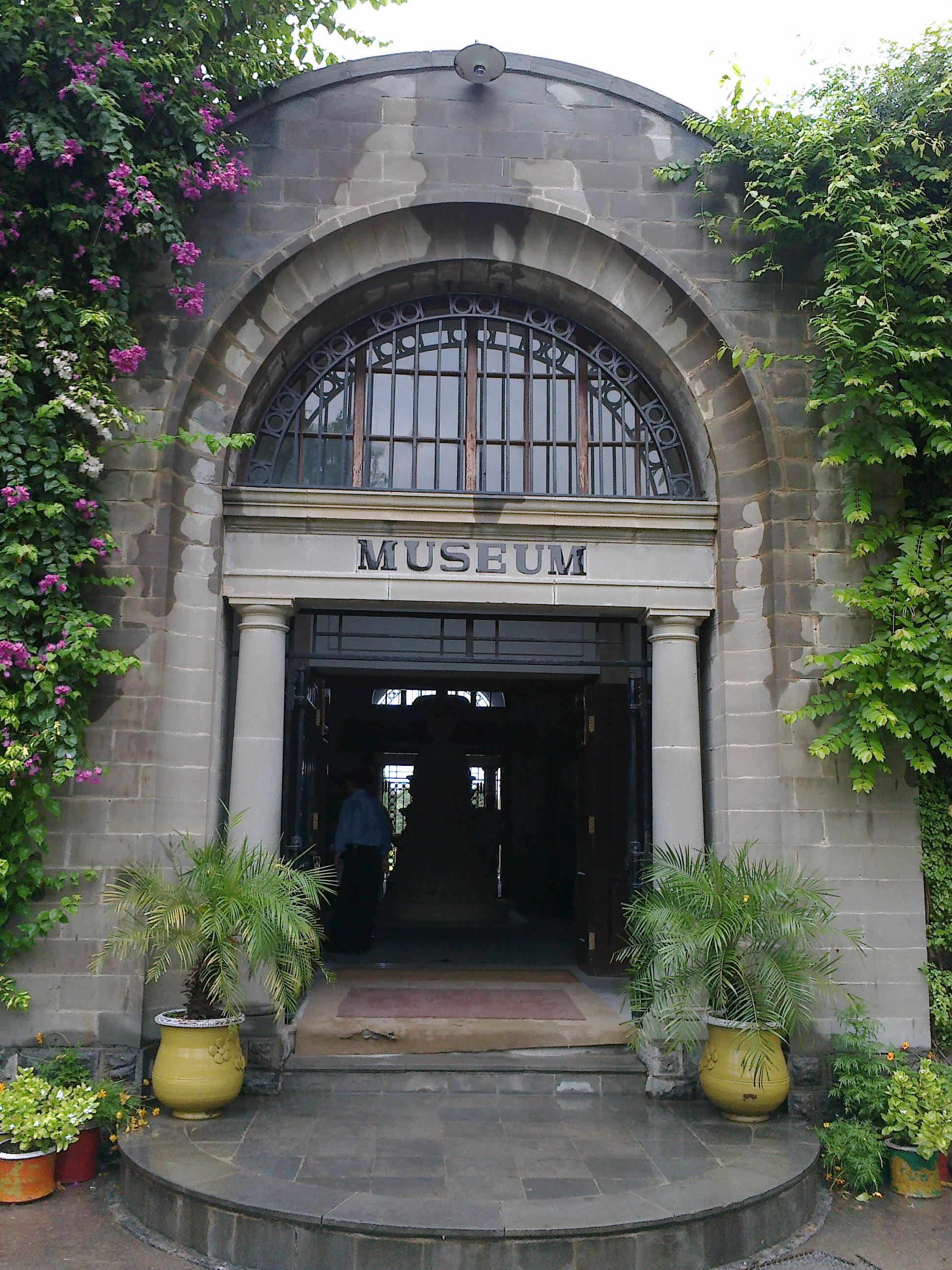
- Taxila Museum Entrance
- Established: 1918
- Location: Shahpur Rd, Bhir Mound City Walls, Taxila, Rawalpindi, Punjab
- Coordinates: 33°44′45″N 72°49′07″E
- Type: Archaeological and historical
- Website: Official website

Taxila Museum (Punjabi, Urdu: ٹیکسلا عجائب گھر) is located at Taxila, Punjab, Pakistan. The museum is home to a significant and comprehensive collection of Gandharan art dating from the 1st to the 7th centuries CE. Most objects in the collection were excavated from the ruins of ancient Taxila.

== Background ==
Taxila Museum is situated in Taxila a tehsil of the Rawalpindi District. This is a site museum and its collection mainly focuses on Gandharan art. These sites at Taxila date back to 600 or 700 BC.

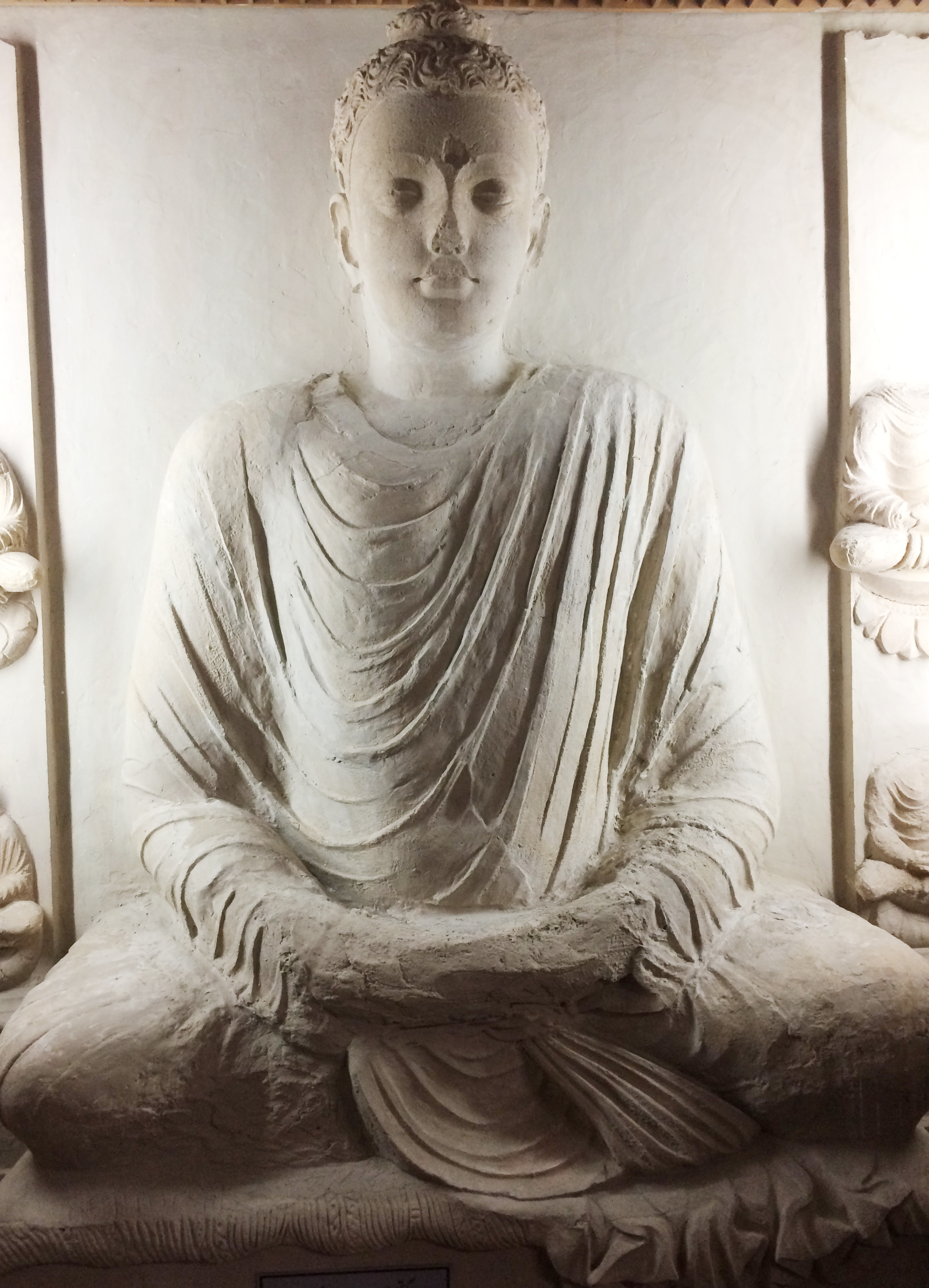
4th Century Meditating Budha at Taxila Museum

== History ==
Construction of the Taxila museum began in 1918, its foundation stone was laid by Lord Chelmsford, the Viceroy of India in 1918. Construction was concluded in 1928 and the museum was opened for public by Sir Muhammad Habibullah then the Minister for Education. Sir John Marshall who was going to be retired from the post of Director General of the Archaeological Survey of India in 1928, could not complete its original plan. The government of Pakistan constructed the northern gallery in 1998.

== Collection and displays ==
There are some 4000 objects displayed, including stone, stucco, terracotta, silver, gold, iron and semiprecious stones. Mainly the display consists of objects from the period 600 B.C to 500 AD. Buddhist, Hindu and Jain religion are well represented through these objects discovered from three ancient cities and more than two dozen Buddhist stupas and monasteries and Greek temples in region

=== Gandharan art ===
Taxila Museum has one of the most significant and comprehensive collections of stone Buddhist sculpture from the first to the seventh centuries in Pakistan (known as Gandharan art. The core of the collection comes from excavated sites in the Taxila Valley, particularly the excavations of Sir John Marshall. Other objects come from excavated sites elsewhere in Gandhanra, from donations such as the Ram Das Collection, or from material confiscated by the police and custom authorities. The whole collection contains more than 1400 objects, and 409 have been published

=== Numismatic collection ===
The Taxila Museum is a site museum and is the repository for the majority of the numismatic material found during archaeological work in Taxila. Digging began in 1917 under John Marshall, then director of the Archaeological Survey of India, and continued until 1934. Since those excavations, work has continued to the present day. The museum contains a large collection of coins from the period of the Indo-Greeks to the late Kushans. Some of these are published in Marshall's original excavation reports, and an ongoing project exists to publish the full collection.

== See also ==
- List of World Heritage Sites in Pakistan
- List of museums in Pakistan

== Literature ==
- Khan, G R (2007) "Kanishka Coins from Taxila" in Gandharan Studies Vol.1: 119ff
- Khan, G R (2008) "Gold Coins in the Cabinet of Taxila Museum, Taxila" in Gandharan Studies Vol.2: 39–61
- Khan, G R (2009) "Huvishka Coins from Taxila", Gandharan Studies, Vol. III, Peshawar, pp. 75–125.
- Khan, G R (2010) "Copper Coins of Vasudeva and His Successors from Taxila", Gandharan Studies Vol. IV, Peshawar, pp. 139–261.
- Khan, M A (2005) A Catalogue of the Gandhara Stone Sculptures in the Taxila Museum, 2 Volumes
- Marshall, J H (1951) Taxila: An Illustrated Account of Archaeological Excavations Carried out at Taxila under the Orders of the Government of India between the years 1917 and 1934. 3 Volumes. Cambridge University Press.
- Marshall, S.J. (2007) A Guide to Taxila, Karachi, 2007 (Rep.).
- Walsh, E.H.C. (1939) Punch – Marked Coins from Taxila, Memoirs of the Archaeological Survey of India, No. 59, Delhi.
- sohaib Afzal, (2017)
