= Taxila =

City in Punjab, Pakistan

Takshashila تکشیلا
- City
- Τάξιλα
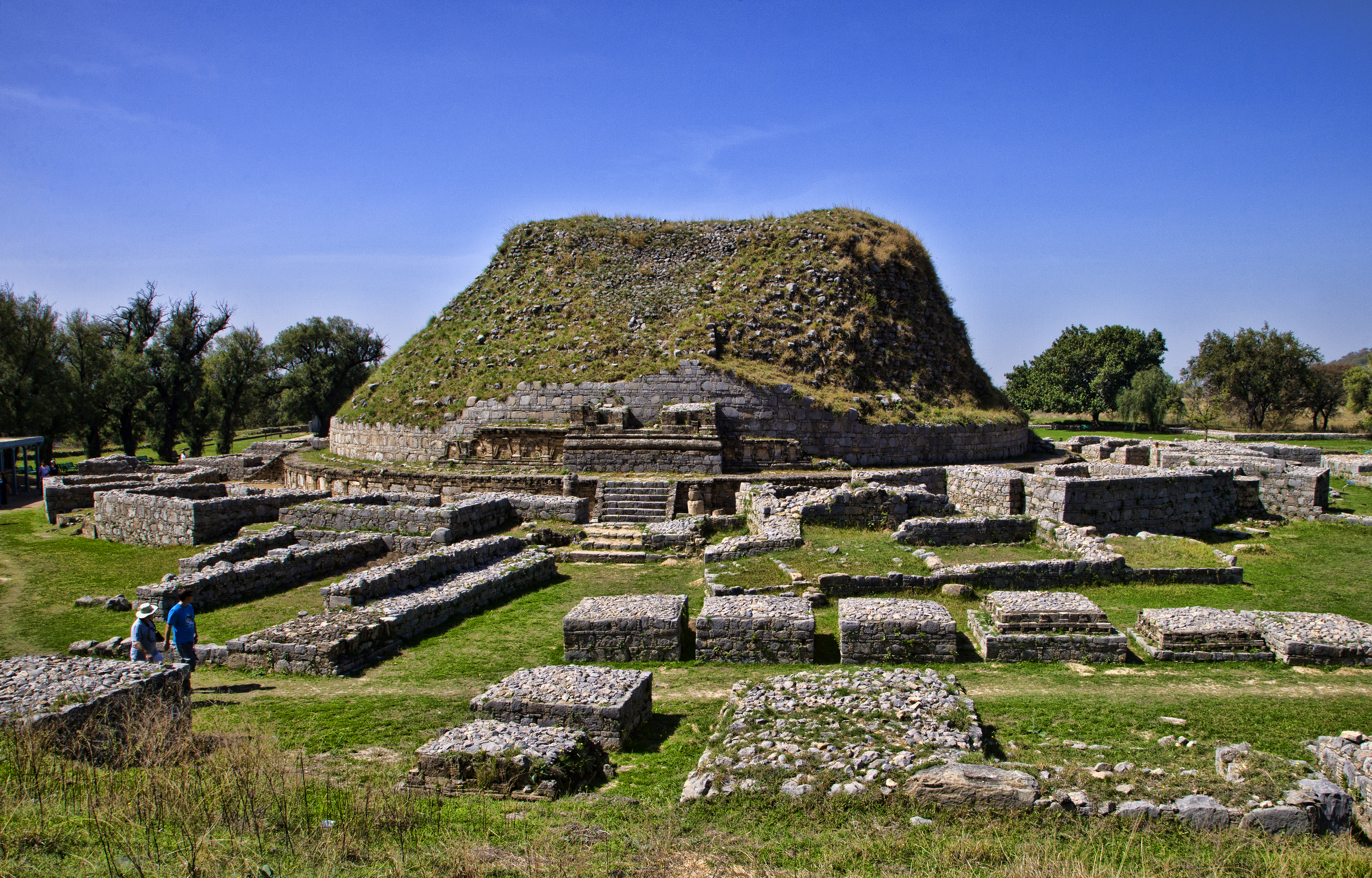
- The Dharmarajika Stupa, a Mauryan-era Buddhist stupa near the city of Taxila (2010)

- Location within Punjab Location within Pakistan
- Coordinates: 33°44′45″N 72°47′15″E
- Country: Pakistan
- Province: Punjab
- Division: Rawalpindi
- District: Rawalpindi
- Tehsil: Taxila
- Established: c. 1000 BCE

Government
  - Type: Municipal Committee
  - Chief Officer: Fazal-e-Akram Khan
- Elevation: 549 m (1,801 ft)

Population (2023 Pakistani census)
  - Total: 136,900 (population of Taxila including Taxila Cantonment)
  - Rank: 88th in Pakistan
  - City: 75,444
  - Cantonment: 61,456
- Time zone: UTC+5:00 (PKT)
- Postal code: 47080
- Dialing code: 596

UNESCO World Heritage Site
- Criteria: iii, vi
- Designated: 1980
- Reference no.: 139

Taxila (Punjabi: ٹيکسلا, romanized: Ṭeksilā; Urdu: تکشیلا, romanized: Takshila), historically known as Takṣaśilā, (Note: Ancient names include: Sanskrit: 𑀢𑀓𑁆𑀓𑀰𑀺𑀮𑀸, romanized: Takṣaśilā; Pali: Takkasilā; Ashokan Prakrit: 𑀢𑀔𑀲𑀺𑀮𑀸, Takkhasilā; Ancient Greek: Τάξιλα, romanized: Táxila; Late Middle Chinese: 呾叉始羅, tat tsrhea syi la) is a city and a World Heritage Site in the Rawalpindi District of Punjab, Pakistan. Founded around c. 1000 BC, it is one of the oldest cities in Asia, and has a population of over 136,900 as of 2023.

Situated on the eastern bank of the Indus River — the pivotal junction of the South Asia and Central Asia — it was possibly founded around 1000 BCE. Ancient Taxila, along with Puṣkalāvatī, was one of the capitals of the Gandhāra civilisation. The city has been suggested to be the capital of the Achaemenid province of Hinduš during c. 500 – c. 330 BCE. It is named in the writings of Pāṇini and its king, called Taxiles by the ancient Greeks, readily recognised the suzerainty of Alexander the Great in 326 BCE once he appeared on the scene after overthrowing the Achaemenids. Mauryans took over the city in the following decades, and as per Buddhist texts, Ashoka was the governor at Taxila before becoming king. Some scholars consider the conventionally called University of ancient Taxila to be one of the earliest universities or education centres in Asia.

In the following centuries, the Indo-Greeks, the Indo-Scythians, the Indo-Parthians and the Kushans successively made Taxila their capital and left architectural marks here. The invading Hunas devastated Taxila in the 5th century, and during his pilgrimage, the 7th-century Chinese monk Xuanzang described it as a city in decline, eventually fading into obscurity. In the mid-19th century, ruins of ancient Taxila were rediscovered by British archaeologist Alexander Cunningham and extensively excavated by Sir John Marshall. In 1980, UNESCO designated Taxila as a World Heritage Site.

Taxila is located within the Taxila Tehsil, on the Pothohar Plateau of northern Punjab, and lies approximately 25 kilometres (16 mi) northwest of the Islamabad–Rawalpindi metropolitan area and is just south of the Haripur District of Khyber Pakhtunkhwa. It is one of Punjab's popular tourist spots, attracting up to one million tourists every year.

== Etymology ==
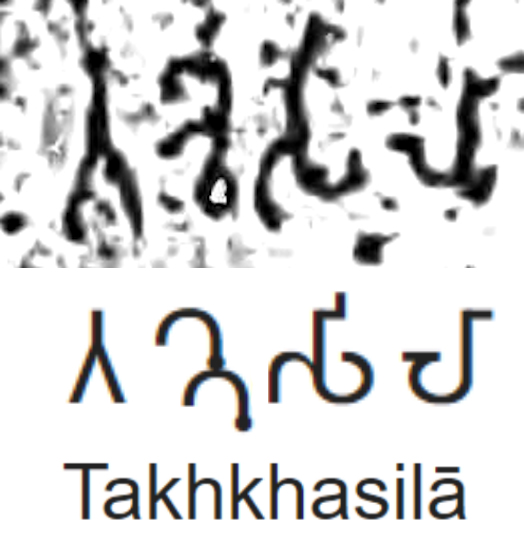
The name for the city of Taxila (Pāli Brahmi: 𑀢𑀔𑁆𑀔𑀲𑀺𑀮𑀸, Takhkhasilā), as it appears on the Heliodorus Pillar inscription, circa 100 BCE

Taxila was known as Takṣaśilā in Sanskrit (per IAST) and as Takkhasilā in Prakrit and Pali. The Sanskrit name of the city translates to the "City of Cut Stone" or "Rock of Taksha". According to the Sanskrit epic Ramayana, the city was founded by Bharata, the younger brother of the Hindu deity Rama, and named in honour of his son, Taksha.

The city's modern name, however, is derived from the ancient Greek rendering noted in Ptolemy's Geography. The Greek-language transcription of Taxila became universally favoured over time.

Faxian, a 4th-century Chinese Buddhist pilgrim who travelled to the city via the Silk Road, had given its meaning as "cut-off head". Based on a Jataka, he interpreted it to be the place where Gautama Buddha — during a previous birth as Pusa or Chandaprabha — cut off his head to feed a hungry lion. This tradition still persists in the name of Sirkap (also meaning "cut-off head"), which was known in the 19th century as Baburkhana ('House of Tiger'), alluding to the place where Gautama Buddha had offered his head. In addition, a hill range to south of the Taxila Valley is called Margala (lit. 'cut-off throat').

== History ==
=== Early settlement ===
The region around Taxila was settled by the Neolithic era, with some ruins at Taxila dating to 1000 BCE. Ruins dating from the Early Harappan period around 1300 BCE have also been discovered in the Taxila area, though the area was eventually abandoned after the collapse of the Indus Valley Civilisation.

The earliest settled occupation in Taxila Valley was found at Sarai Khola, located 2 km to the south-west of Taxila Museum, where three radiocarbon dates from Period I suggest the site was first occupied between the late 4th and early 3rd millennium BCE, with deposits of polished stone celts, chert blades and a distinctive type of highly burnished pottery that shows clear signs of the use of woven baskets in the manufacturing process and the application of a slurry to the exterior surface.

Periods IA and II at Sarai Khola seem to show continuity from Period I, with the appearance of red burnished wares. However, Kot Diji-style wares were found in greater numbers, and the Kot Diji-style forms show signs of having been wheel-thrown, marking a clear technological change from the Period I material. Seven radiocarbon dates were also taken from the earlier and later Period II/Kot Diji, and seem to show this phase dates from the mid-late 3rd to early 2nd millennium BCE.

=== Gandhāra kingdom ===
Gandhara was an ancient Indo-Aryan kingdom of northwestern South Asia during the Iron Age. The capital of the kingdom was Taxila. The first major settlement at Taxila, in Hathial mound, was established around 1000 BCE. By 900 BCE, the city was already involved in regional commerce, as the discovered pottery shards reveal trading ties between the city and Puṣkalāvatī.

The Brahmanas (written 8th–6th centuries BCE) preserve the name of king Nagnajit of Gandhara, and later Buddhist sources mention king Pukkusāti during the times of Buddha. Later, Taxila was inhabited at Bhir Mound, dated to some time around the period 800–525 BCE with these early layers bearing grooved red burnished ware.

=== Achaemenid Empire ===
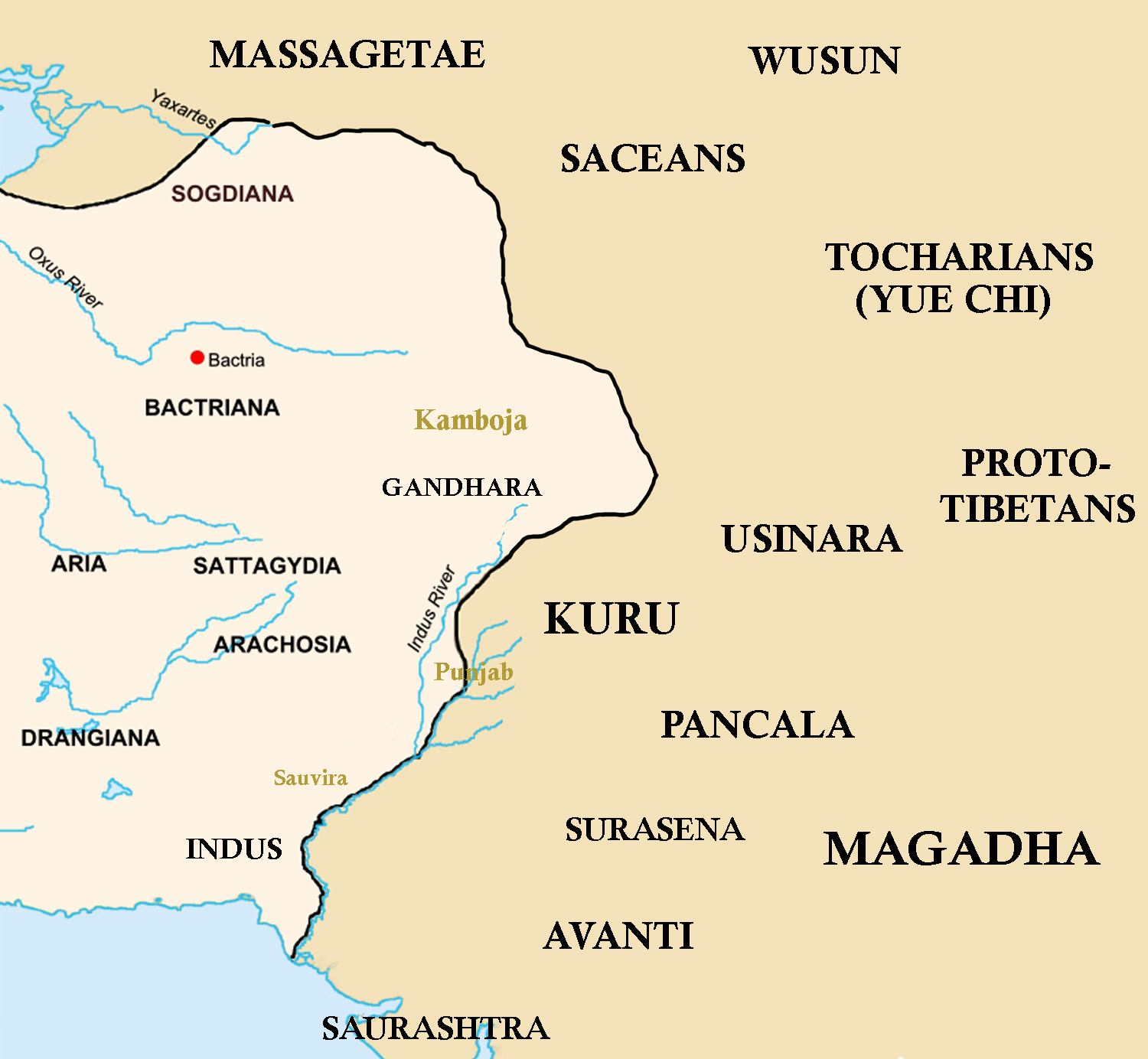
Eastern border of the Achaemenid Empire

Archaeological excavations show that the city may have grown significantly by the time of the invasion of the Persian Achaemenid Empire in the 6th century BCE. In 516 BCE, Darius I embarked on a campaign to conquer Central Asia, Ariana and Bactria, before marching onto what is now Afghanistan and northern Pakistan; according to Herodotus, he appointed Scylax of Caryanda to explore the Indian Ocean from the mouth of the Indus to the Suez.

Taxila was sometimes ruled as a part of the Gandhāra kingdom (whose capital was Puṣkalāvatī), particularly after the Achaemenid period, but on other occasions formed its own independent district or city-state.

=== Hellenistic period ===
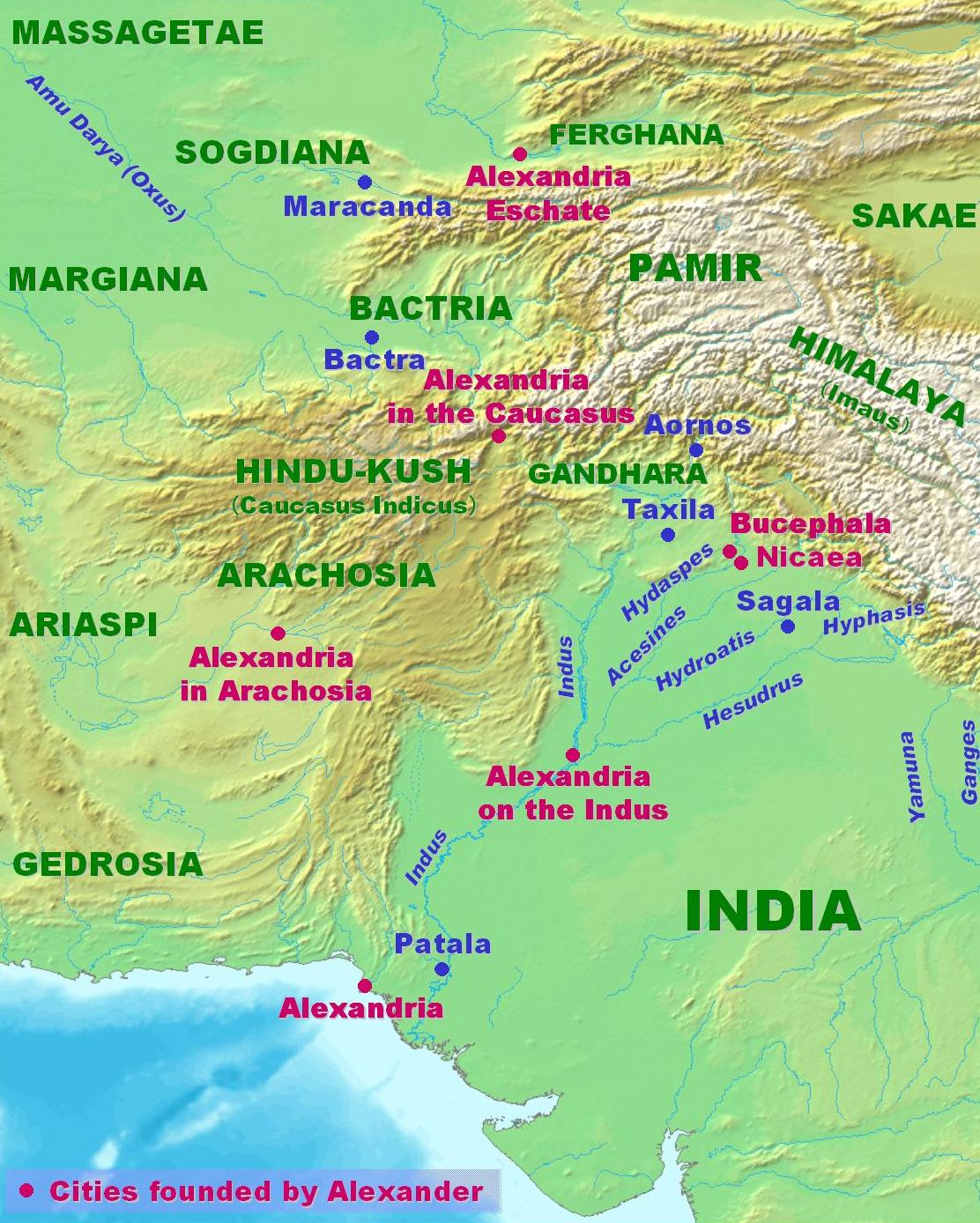
A map of Alexander's campaign in ancient India.

During his invasion of the Indus Valley, Alexander the Great was able to gain control of Taxila (Ancient Greek: Τάξιλα) in 326 BCE, as its ruler, king Taxiles (Āmbhi), surrendered without a battle. Greek historians accompanying Alexander described Taxila as "wealthy, prosperous, and well governed". Arrian writes that Alexander was welcomed by the citizens of the city, and he offered sacrifices and celebrated a gymnastic and equestrian contest there.

Alexander maintained Taxiles on his position as satrap. After Alexander's death in 323 BCE, the subsequent partitions of Babylon and of Triparadisus also recognised Taxiles as the ruler of his realm; subsequently the province is believed to have passed to his general Seleucus I Nicator, the founder of the successor Seleucid Empire, along with much of the once Achaemenid territories.

=== Mauryan Empire ===
Within a decade of departure of Alexander, the provincial capital of Taxila was captured by Chandragupta Maurya; following the Seleucid–Mauryan war, the Seleucid satrapies in South Asia were formally annexed by his expanding Mauryan Empire. His advisor, Chanakya, was said to have hailed from Taxila by the Buddhist texts. During the reign of Ashoka, Chandragupta's grandson, the city became a great seat of Buddhist learning. His Aramaic inscription has been discovered from Taxila.

Taxila was located in a strategic location along the ancient Grand Trunk Road that connected the Mauryan capital at Pataliputra in Bihar, with Puruṣapura, Puṣkalāvatī, and onwards towards Central Asia via Kashmir, Bactria, and Kāpiśa.

=== Later kingdoms ===
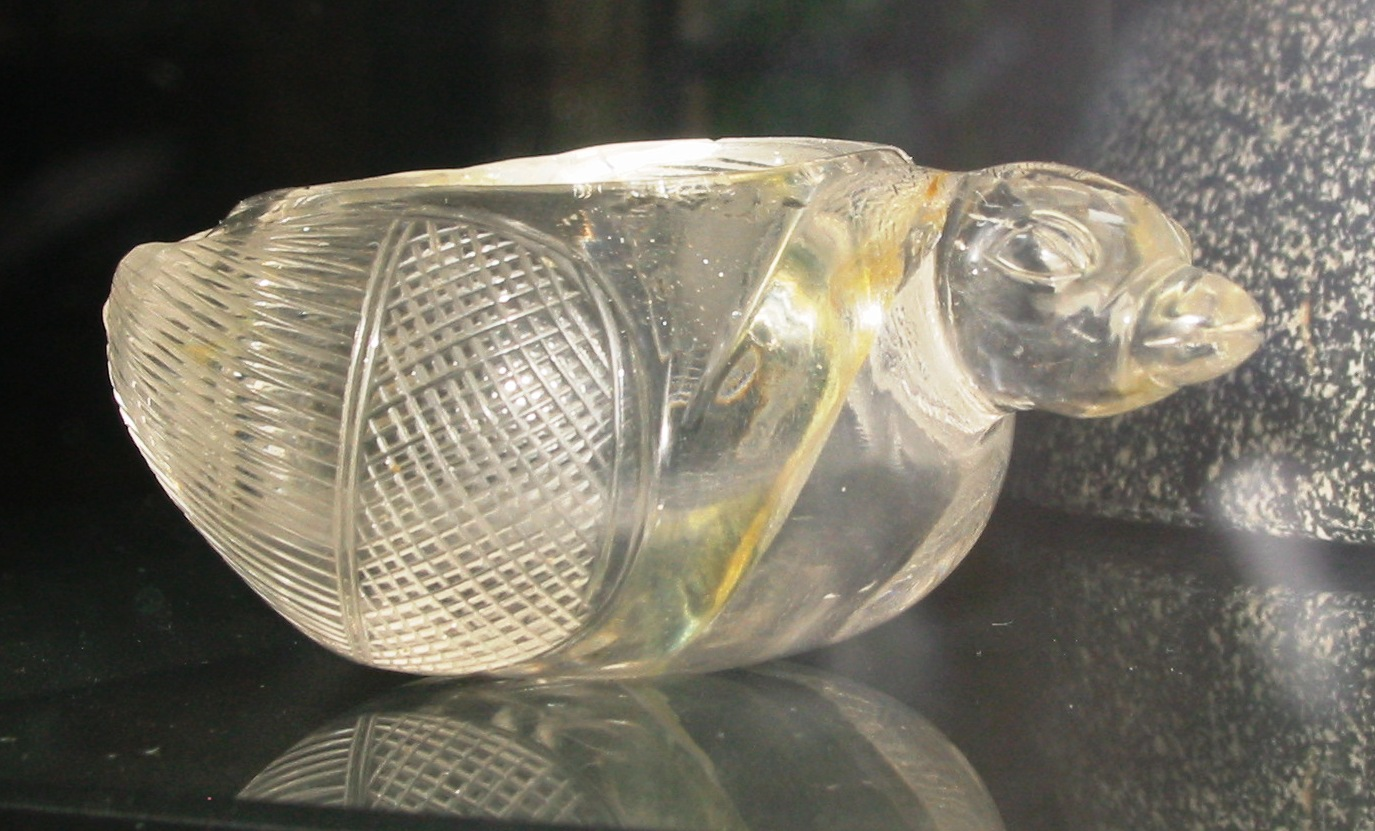
Reliquary in the form of a crystal goose dating to the 1st Century AD in the British Museum.

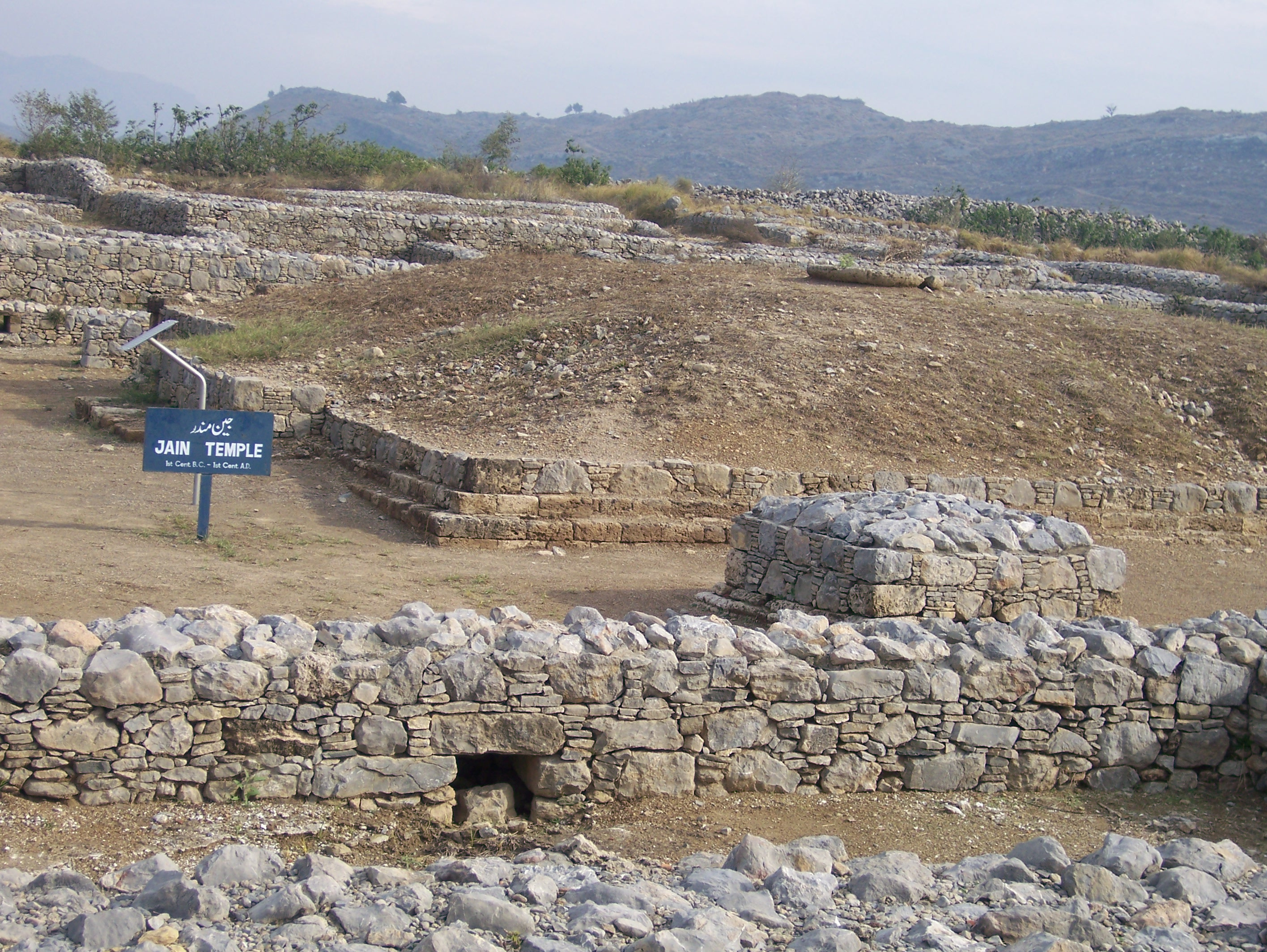
Jain Temple at Sirkap

In the 2nd century BCE, Taxila was annexed by the Greco-Bactrian kingdom. The Indo-Greeks built a new capital, Sirkap, on the opposite bank of the river from Taxila. During this period, several dynasties (such as the one founded by Antialcidas) likely ruled from the city as their capital. During lulls in Greek rule, the city managed profitably on its own, to independently control several local trade guilds, who also minted most of the city's autonomous coinage. The last Greek king of Taxila was overthrown by the Indo-Scythian chief Maues around 90 BCE. In about the 1st century BCE or 1st century CE, an Indo-Scythian king named Azilises had three mints, one of which was at Taxila, and struck coins with obverse legends in Greek and Kharoṣṭhī.

Gondophares, founder of the Indo-Parthian Kingdom, conquered Taxila around 20 BCE, and made Taxila his capital. According to early Christian legend, Thomas the Apostle visited Gondophares IV around 46 CE, possibly at Taxila given that city was Gondophares' capital. Around the year 50 CE, the Greek Neopythagorean philosopher Apollonius of Tyana allegedly visited Taxila, under the rule of 'Phraotes', which was described by his biographer, Philostratus, writing some 200 years later, as a fortified city laid out on a symmetrical plan, similar in size to Nineveh. Modern archaeology confirms this description.

=== Kushan Empire ===
Inscriptions dating to 76 CE demonstrate that the city had come under Kushan rule by that time, after being captured from the Parthians by Kujula Kadphises, founder of the Kushan Empire. The great Kushan ruler Kanishka later founded Sirsukh, the most recent of the ancient settlements at Taxila. The city became well known for its trade links, including silk, sandalwood, horses, cotton, silverware, pearls, and spices. It is during this time that the city heavily features in classical Sanskrit literature – both as a centre of culture as well as a militarised border city.

=== Later empires ===
In the mid-fourth century CE, the Gupta Empire is believed to have political influence in the eastern Gandhara, including Taxila. A large number of Sasanian coins have been discovered from Taxila as well, indicating some sort of Sasanian control.

Taxila's university remained in existence during the travels of Chinese pilgrim Faxian, who visited it around 400 CE. He wrote that Taxila's name translated as "the Severed Head", and was the site of a story in the life of Buddha "where he gave his head to a man".

=== Hunnic invasions and decline ===
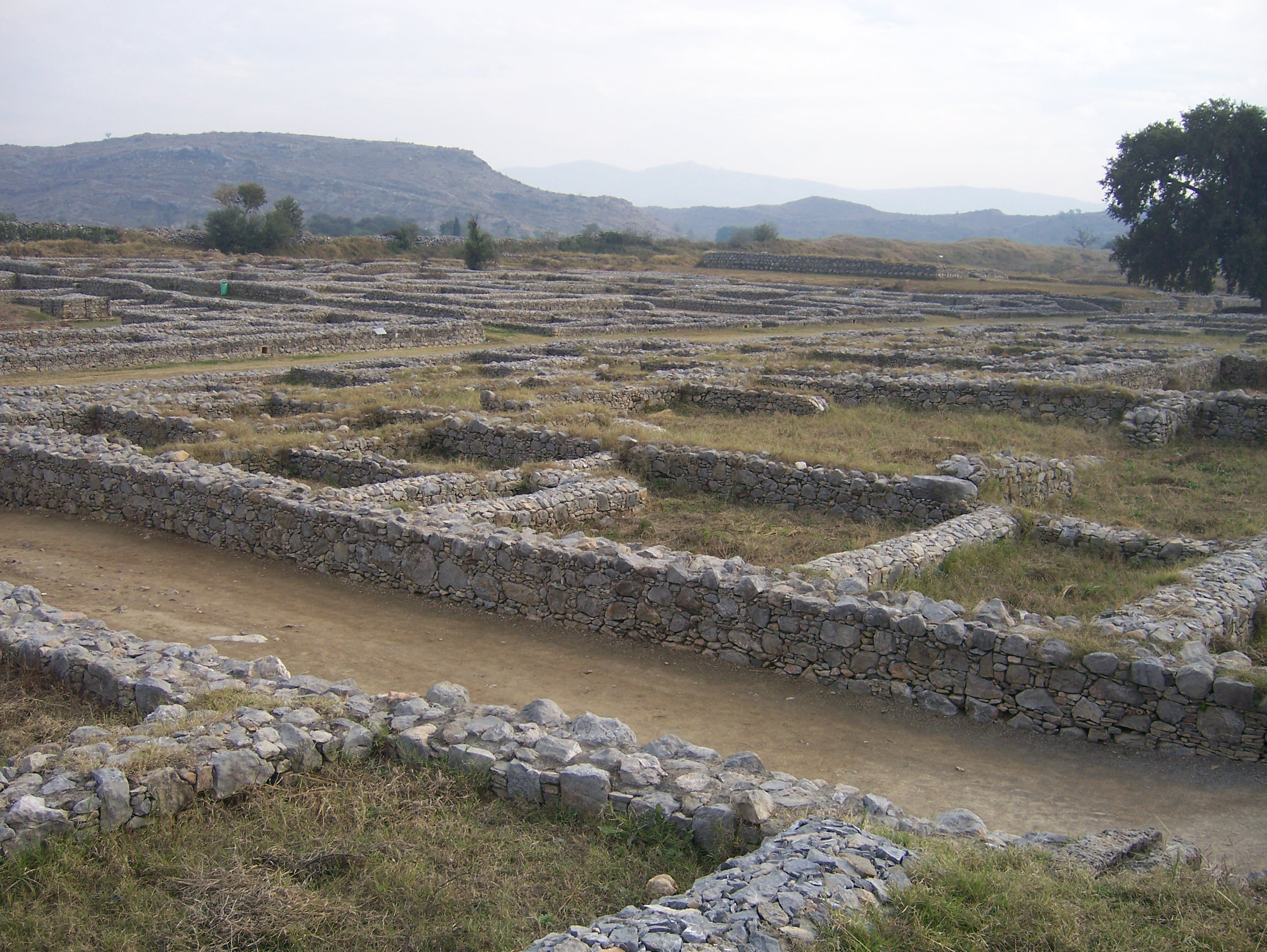
A view over the ruins of Sirkap.

The Kidarites, vassals of the Hephthalite Empire are known to have invaded Taxila in c. 450 CE. Though repelled by the Gupta emperor Skandagupta, the city would not recover, probably on account of the strong Hunnic presence in the area, breakdown of trade as well as the three-way war among Persia, the Kidarites, and the Huns in western Gandhāra.

The White Huns and Alchon Huns swept over Gandhāra and Punjab around 470 CE, causing widespread devastation and destruction of Taxila's famous Buddhist monasteries and stupas, a blow from which the city would never recover. From 500 CE to 540 CE, the city languished after falling under the control of the Hunns ruled by Mihirakula. Mihirakula presided over some destruction of Buddhist sites, monasteries and Hindu temples across northwestern regions of the Indian subcontinent.

Xuanzang visited India between 629 and 645 CE. Taxila which was desolate and half-ruined was visited by him in 630 CE, and he found most of its sangharamas still ruined and desolate. Only a few monks remained there. He adds that the kingdom had become a dependency of Kashmir with the local leaders fighting amongst themselves for power. He also noted that it had some time previously been a subject of Kapisa. Later Islamic geographers, such as al-Biruni, name a region known as Takeshar, which has been identified with the general location of Taxila; it remained under the Odi Shahi dynasty until it was conquered by the Ghaznavids.

The Arab historian al-Biladhuri preserves the name of a kingdom called al-Usaifan which was located between Kashmir, Multan and Kabul. During the reign of caliph al-Mu'tasim its king is said to have converted to Islam and abandoned his old faith due to the death of his son, despite having priests of a temple pray for his recovery; al-Usaifan is identified with the kingdom of Taxila by some authors.

== Archaeology ==
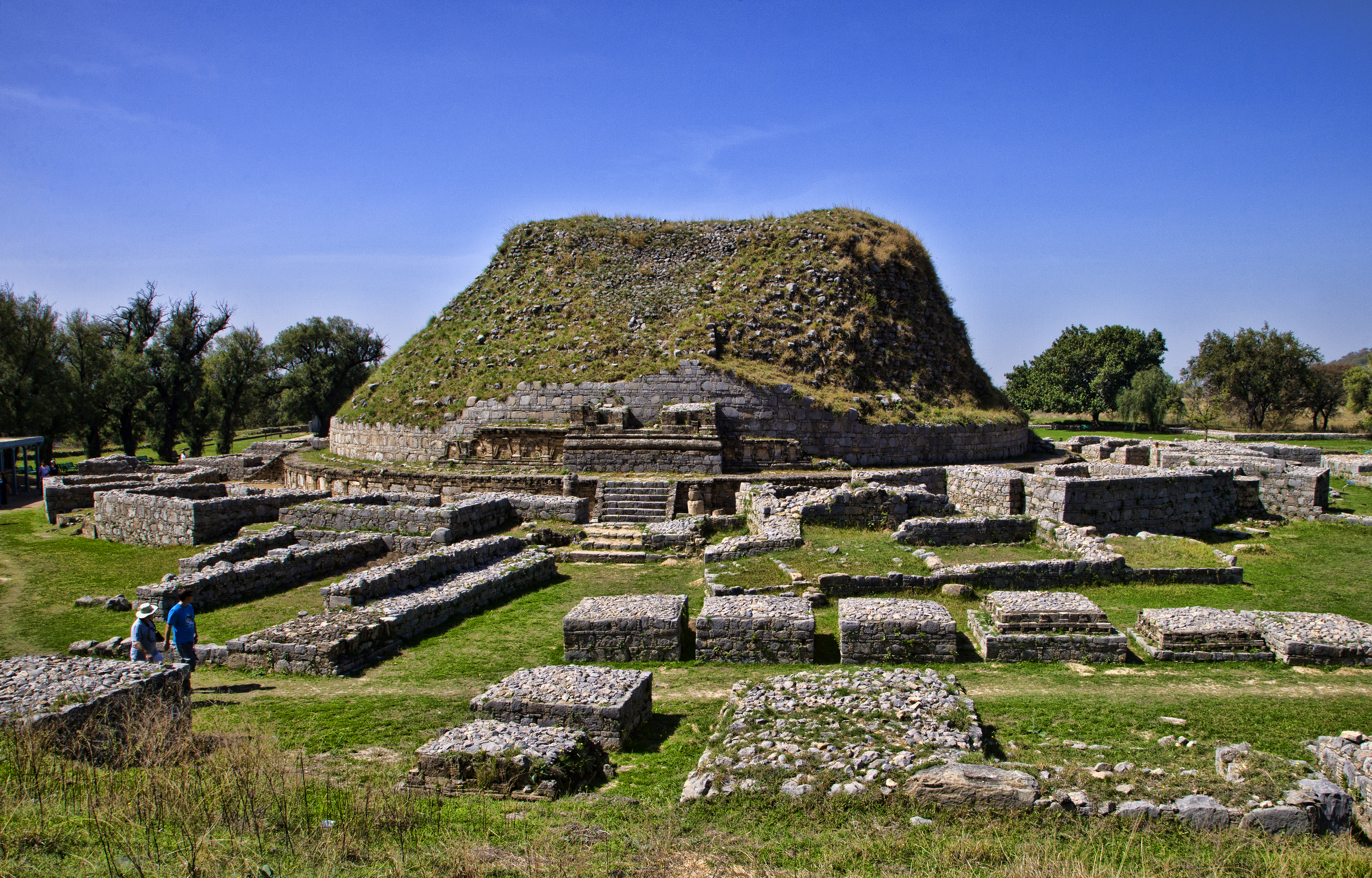
The Dharmarajika Stupa

The main ruins of Taxila include four major cities, each belonging to a distinct time period, at three different sites. The earliest settlement at Taxila is found in the Hathial section, which yielded pottery shards that date from as early as the late 2nd millennium BCE to the 6th century BCE. The Bhir Mound ruins at the site date from the 6th century BCE, and are adjacent to Hathial. The ruins of Sirkap date to the 2nd century BCE, and were built by the Greco-Bactrian kings who ruled in the region following Alexander's invasion in 326 BCE. The third and most recent settlement is that of Sirsukh, which was built by rulers of the Kushan empire, who ruled from nearby Purushapura (modern Peshawar).

The sites of a number of important cities noted in ancient Indian texts were identified by scholars early in the 19th century. The lost city of Taxila, however, was not identified until later, in 1863–64. Its identification was made difficult partly due to errors in the distances recorded by Pliny in his Naturalis Historia which pointed to a location somewhere on the Haro river, two days march from the Indus. Alexander Cunningham, the founder and the first director-general of the Archaeological Survey of India, noticed that this position did not agree with the descriptions provided in the itineraries of Chinese pilgrims and in particular, that of Xuanzang, the 7th-century Buddhist monk. Unlike Pliny, these sources noted that the journey to Taxila from the Indus took three days and not two. Cunningham's subsequent explorations in 1863–64 of a site at Shah-dheri convinced him that his hypothesis was correct.

Now as Hwen Thsang, on his return to China, was accompanied by laden elephants, his three days' journey from Takhshasila [sic] to the Indus at Utakhanda, or Ohind, must necessarily have been of the same length as those of modern days, and, consequently, the site of the city must be looked for somewhere in the neighbourhood of Kâla-ka-sarâi. This site is found near Shah-dheri, just one mile to the north-east of Kâla-ka-sarâi, in the extensive ruins of a fortified city, around which I was able to trace no less than 55 stupas, of which two are as large as the great Manikyala tope, twenty eight monasteries, and nine temples.

— Alexander Cunningham,

Taxila's archaeological sites lie near modern Taxila about 35 km (22 mi) northwest of the city of Rawalpindi. The sites were first excavated by John Marshall, who worked at Taxila over a period of twenty years from 1913.

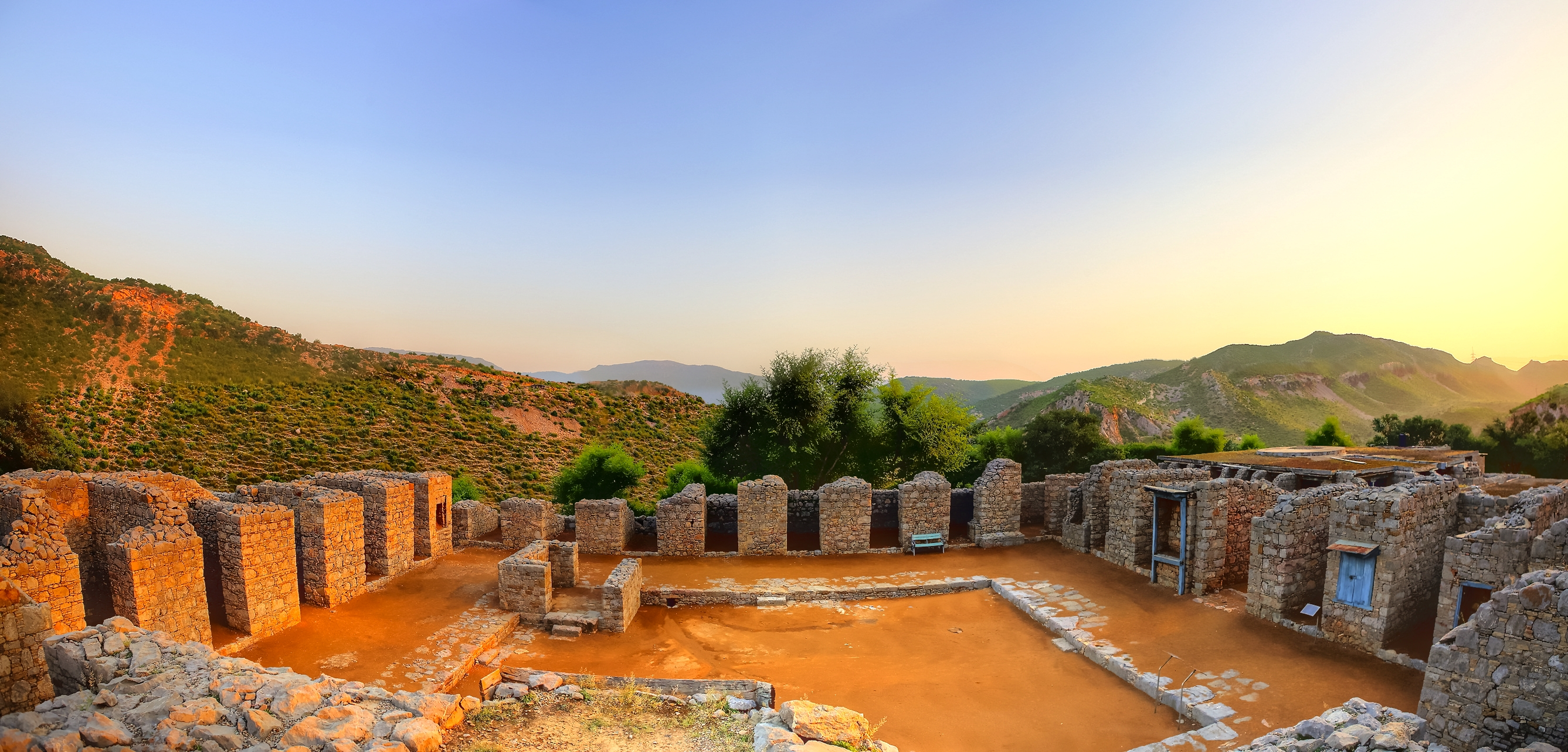
Panorama of the Jaulian monastery

The vast archaeological site includes neolithic remains dating to 3360 BCE, and Early Harappan remains dating to 2900–2600 BCE at Sarai Kala. Taxila, however, is most famous for ruins of several settlements, the earliest dating from around 1000 BCE. It is also known for its collection of Buddhist religious monuments, including the Dharmarajika stupa, the Jaulian monastery, and the Mohra Muradu monastery.

=== World Heritage Site ===
Taxila was designated a UNESCO World Heritage Site in 1980 in particular for the ruins of the four settlement sites which "reveal the pattern of urban evolution on the Indian subcontinent through more than five centuries". The serial site includes a number of monuments and other historical places of note in the area besides the four settlements at Bhir, Saraikala, Sirkap, and Sirsukh. They number 18 in all:

1. Khanpur Cave
2. Saraikala, prehistoric mound
3. Bhir Mound
4. Sirkap (fortified city)
5. Sirsukh (fortified ruined city)
6. Dharmarajika stupa and monastery
7. Khader Mohra (Akhuri)
8. Kalawan group of buildings
9. Giri complex of monuments
10. Kunala stupa and monastery
11. Jandial complex
12. Lalchak and Badalpur Buddhist stupa
13. Mohra Moradu stupa and monastery
14. Pippala stupa and monastery
15. Jaulian stupa and monastery
16. Lalchak mounds
17. Buddhist remains around Bhallar stupa
18. Giri Mosque and tombs

In a 2010 report, Global Heritage Fund identified Taxila as one of 12 worldwide sites most "on the Verge" of irreparable loss and damage, citing insufficient management, development pressure, looting, and war and conflict as primary threats. However, significant preservation efforts have since been carried out by the Pakistani government, which has resulted in the site's recategorization as "well-preserved" by different international publications. In 2017, it was announced that Thailand would assist in conservation efforts at Taxila, as well as at Buddhist sites in the Swat Valley. In 2026, UNESCO warned Pakistan that unauthorized reconstruction at the Mohra Moradu and Sirkap sites within the Heritage site could lead to its inclusion on the List of World Heritage in Danger. UNESCO warned that would not hesitate to "delist" the Heritage Sites. This came after a whistleblower reported that original walls had been replaced with cement, a practice inconsistent with UNESCO conservation norms. A similar warning had been given in 1998, for Bhir Mound's inclusion on the danger list, over a (since-shelved) stadium project.

== In religious literature ==
In Vedic texts such as the Shatapatha Brahmana, it is mentioned that the Vedic philosopher Uddālaka Āruṇi (c. 7th century BCE) had travelled to the region of Gandhāra. In later Buddhist texts, the 4th – 3rd century BCE Jataka tales, it is specified that Taxila was the city where Aruni and his son Śvetaketu each had received their education.

One of the earliest mentions of Taxila is in Pāṇini's Aṣṭādhyāyī, a Sanskrit grammar treatise dated to the 4th century BCE.

Much of the Hindu epic, the Mahabharata, is a conversation between Vaishampayana (a pupil of the sage, Vyasa) and King Janamejaya. It is traditionally believed that the story was first recited by Vaishampayana at the behest of Vyasa during the snake sacrifice performed by Janamejaya at Takshashila. The audience also included Ugrashravas, an itinerant bard, who would later recite the story to a group of priests at an ashram in the Naimisha Forest from where the story was further disseminated. The Kuru kingdom's heir, Parikshit (grandson of Arjuna) is said to have been enthroned at Takshashila.

The Ramayana describes Takshashila as a magnificent city famed for its wealth which was founded by Bharata, the younger brother of Rama. Bharata, who also founded nearby Puṣkalāvatī, instated his two sons, Taksha and Pushkala, as the rulers of the two cities.

In the Buddhist Jatakas, Taxila is described as the capital of the kingdom of Gandhāra and a great centre of learning with world-famous teachers. The Jatakas mention non-Buddhist institutions and teachers in Taxila. They show the predominance of Vedic and technical disciplines including law, medicine, and military science. The Takkasila Jataka, more commonly known as the Telapatta Jataka, tells the tale of a prince of Kashi who is told that he would become the king of Takshashila if he could reach the city within seven days without falling prey to the yakshinis who waylaid travellers in the forest. According to the Dipavamsa, one of Taxila's early kings was a Kshatriya named Dipankara who was succeeded by twelve sons and grandsons. Kuñjakarṇa, mentioned in the Avadanakalpalata, is another king associated with the city.

=== In Jainism ===
Takshashila was closely associated with Jainism. According to the Jaina tradition, Rishabhanatha, the first Tirthankara, entrusted the region of Ayodhya to his son Bharata and the region of Takshashila to his son Bahubali.

Per canonical Śvetāmbara Jaina texts Āvaśyaka Cūrṇi and Āvaśyaka Niryukti, Tirthankara Rishabhanatha visited Takshashila while wandering after initiation as a monk millions of years ago. Upon learning of his arrival, Bahubali, who was not in the city at that moment, rushed to the city, but the Rishabhanatha had already departed before Bahubali arrived. His footprints were subsequently consecrated by Bahubali who erected a throne and a dharmachakra ('wheel of the law') over them several miles in height and circumference. The 14th century Vividha Tirtha Kalpa mentions this establishment.

As per the canonical Jain text Mahanishith Sutra, the Dharmachakra Tirtha established by Bahubali is recognized as the abode of Chandraprabha, and Takshashila is also referred to as "Dharmachakra Bhumi," marking its significance as a center of Jainism.

While there is limited information about the subsequent period, it is noted that during the medieval era, Takshashila faced challenges due to the proliferation of fraudulent ascetics and a lack of proper sustenance, leading to restrictions on Jaina ascetics' wandering in the region, as documented in six ancient Jaina texts known as the Chedasūtras.

Emperor Samprati built a Jain temple known as "Kunala Stupa" in honor of his father Kunala. During Samprati's rule, the extent of the wandering of Jaina monks developed multifold times, and later also included this region.

According to the Prabhavakacharita, by the second to third century CE, there were approximately 500 Jaina temples in Takshashila, and it was occupied by a significant number of Jainas. However, a devastating plague struck the city, leading to widespread death and chaos. The Jaina community sent a Sravaka named Virchand to Nadol, who conveyed their suffering to Acharya Manadevasuri. Suri gave "Laghu Shanti Stava," stating that reciting it would alleviate the plague. Following the recitation, the plague subsided within a few days. However, in the third year, the Turks devastated the city.

According to Acharya Dhaneswarasuri's "Shatrunjaya Mahatmya," Javad Shah, a merchant from Mahuva, renovated Palitana temples in Vikrama Samvat year 108. He retrieved an image of Rishabhanatha from Takshashila and established it as the principal deity at the principal shrine amongst Shatrunjaya temples.

Excavations in Takshashila support these traditions. Dr. Sir John Marshall noted that Indo-Greek kings displaced the city from its fortified position and settled it in Sirkap during the early years of the second century BCE. The city remained inhabited through the Greek, Shaka, Pahlava, and Kushan periods. Numerous small and large temples have been discovered along the main road of Sirkap. Dr. Marshall concluded that the temples in blocks 'F' and 'G' of Sirkap are Jaina temples due to their architectural similarities with Kankali Tila, a Jaina stupa, found in Mathura. In block 'G,' located on the right side of the main road, numerous ruins of large buildings have been found, characterized by the presence of small temples alongside these structures, which were accessible to devotees. This evidence strongly supports claims by the Jaina tradition that Takshashila was a significant center for Jainism.

=== Ancient centre of learning ===
By some accounts, Taxila was considered to be one of the earliest (or the earliest) universities in the world. The school consisted of several monasteries with large dormitories or lecture halls where the religious instruction was provided on an individualistic basis. Others do not consider it a university in the modern sense, in that the teachers living there may not have had official membership of particular colleges, and there did not seem to have existed purpose-built lecture halls and residential quarters in Taxila, in contrast to the later Nalanda university in eastern India. The education system was closer to Gurukul system in terms of similarity.

Taxila became a noted centre of learning (including the religious teachings of Historical Vedic Religion and Buddhism) at least several centuries BCE, and continued to attract students from around the old world until the destruction of the city in the 5th century. It has been suggested that at its height, Taxila exerted a sort of "intellectual suzerainty" over other centres of learning in India and its primary concern was not with elementary, but higher education. Generally, a student entered Taxila at the age of sixteen. The ancient and the most revered scriptures, and the Eighteen Shilpas or Arts, which included skills such as archery, hunting, and elephant lore, were taught, in addition to its law school, medical school, and school of military science. Students came to Taxila from far-off places such as Kashi, Kosala and Magadha, in spite of the long and arduous journey they had to undergo, on account of the excellence of the learned teachers there, all recognised as authorities on their respective subjects. The admission to Takshashila was not only limited to the students belonging to the elite class, some evidence mentions the sons of kings, nobles, merchants, tailors, and even fishermen getting education at Takshashila.

=== Notable students and teachers ===
Taxila had great influence on Hindu culture and the Sanskrit language. It is perhaps best known for its association with Chanakya, also known as Kautilya, the strategist who guided Chandragupta Maurya and assisted in the founding of the Mauryan empire. The Ayurvedic healer Charaka also studied at Taxila. He also started teaching at Taxila in the later period. Pāṇini, the grammarian who codified the rules that would define Classical Sanskrit, was a part of the community at Taxila.

Jīvaka, the court physician of the Magadha emperor Bimbisara who once cured the Buddha, and the Buddhism-supporting ruler of Kosala, Prasenajit, are some important personalities mentioned in Pali texts who studied at Taxila.

No external authorities like kings or local leaders subjected the scholastic activities at Taxila to their control. Each teacher formed his own institution, enjoying complete autonomy in work, teaching as many students as he liked and teaching subjects he liked without conforming to any centralised syllabus. Study terminated when the teacher was satisfied with the student's level of achievement. In general, specialisation in a subject took around eight years, though this could be lengthened or shortened in accordance with the intellectual abilities and dedication of the student in question. In most cases the "schools" were located within the teachers' private houses, and at times students were advised to quit their studies if they were unable to fit into the social, intellectual and moral atmosphere there.

Knowledge was considered too sacred to be bartered for money, and hence any stipulation that fees ought to be paid was vigorously condemned. Financial support came from the society at large, as well as from rich merchants and wealthy parents. Though the number of students studying under a single Guru sometimes numbered in the hundreds, teachers did not deny education even if the student was poor; free boarding and lodging was provided, and students had to do manual work in the household. Paying students, such as princes, were taught during the day, while non-paying ones were taught at night. Gurudakshina was usually expected at the completion of a student's studies, but it was essentially a mere token of respect and gratitude - many times being nothing more than a turban, a pair of sandals, or an umbrella. In cases of poor students being unable to afford even that, they could approach the king, who would then step in and provide something. Not providing a poor student a means to supply his Guru's Dakshina was considered the greatest slur on a King's reputation.

Examinations were treated as superfluous, and not considered part of the requirements to complete one's studies. The process of teaching was critical and thorough- unless one unit was mastered completely, the student was not allowed to proceed to the next. No convocations were held upon completion, and no written "degrees" were awarded, since it was believed that knowledge was its own reward. Using knowledge for earning a living or for any selfish end was considered sacrilegious.

Students arriving at Taxila usually had completed their primary education at home (until the age of eight), and their secondary education in the Ashrams (between the ages of eight and twelve), and therefore came to Taxila chiefly to reach the ends of knowledge in specific disciplines.

Kaundinya I, the legendary founder of Funan, was said to have hailed from Taxila or Indraprastha according to the Cambodian annals. Similarly, the dynasty of Khotan traced its origin from the nobles of Taxila.

== Demographics ==
Population

Historical population

Year	Pop.	±% p.a.
1981	38,374	—
1998	71,882	+3.76%

Year	Pop.	±% p.a.
2017	121,952	+2.82%
2023	136,900	+1.95%

According to 2023 census, Taxila had a population of 136,900.

=== Languages ===
Languages of Taxila Tehsil(2023 Census)
1. Punjabi (62.0%)
2. Pashto (15.9%)
3. Urdu (12.5%)
4. Hindko (5.80%)
5. Kashmiri (1.30%)
6. Others (2.50%)

== Geography ==
Taxila is located 32 km (20 mi) north-west of the Pakistani capital Islamabad. The city is located approximately 549 metres (1,801 ft) above sea level.

=== Climate ===
Taxila features a humid subtropical climate (Köppen: Cwa)

Climate data for Taxila
Month	Jan	Feb	Mar	Apr	May	Jun	Jul	Aug	Sep	Oct	Nov	Dec	Year
Mean daily maximum °C (°F)	17 (63)	19.5 (67.1)	24.2 (75.6)	29.9 (85.8)	35.4 (95.7)	39.5 (103.1)	35.8 (96.4)	33.7 (92.7)	33.6 (92.5)	30.9 (87.6)	25 (77)	19.3 (66.7)	28.7 (83.6)
Daily mean °C (°F)	9.8 (49.6)	12.5 (54.5)	17.3 (63.1)	22.6 (72.7)	27.6 (81.7)	32 (90)	30.3 (86.5)	28.6 (83.5)	27.6 (81.7)	22.7 (72.9)	16.2 (61.2)	11.3 (52.3)	21.5 (70.8)
Mean daily minimum °C (°F)	2.7 (36.9)	5.5 (41.9)	10.4 (50.7)	15.3 (59.5)	19.9 (67.8)	24.5 (76.1)	24.8 (76.6)	23.6 (74.5)	21.6 (70.9)	14.5 (58.1)	7.5 (45.5)	3.3 (37.9)	14.5 (58.0)
Average precipitation mm (inches)	58 (2.3)	56 (2.2)	68 (2.7)	44 (1.7)	38 (1.5)	37 (1.5)	237 (9.3)	236 (9.3)	92 (3.6)	23 (0.9)	16 (0.6)	36 (1.4)	941 (37)
Source: Climate-Data.org, altitude: 497m

== Economy ==
=== Tourism ===
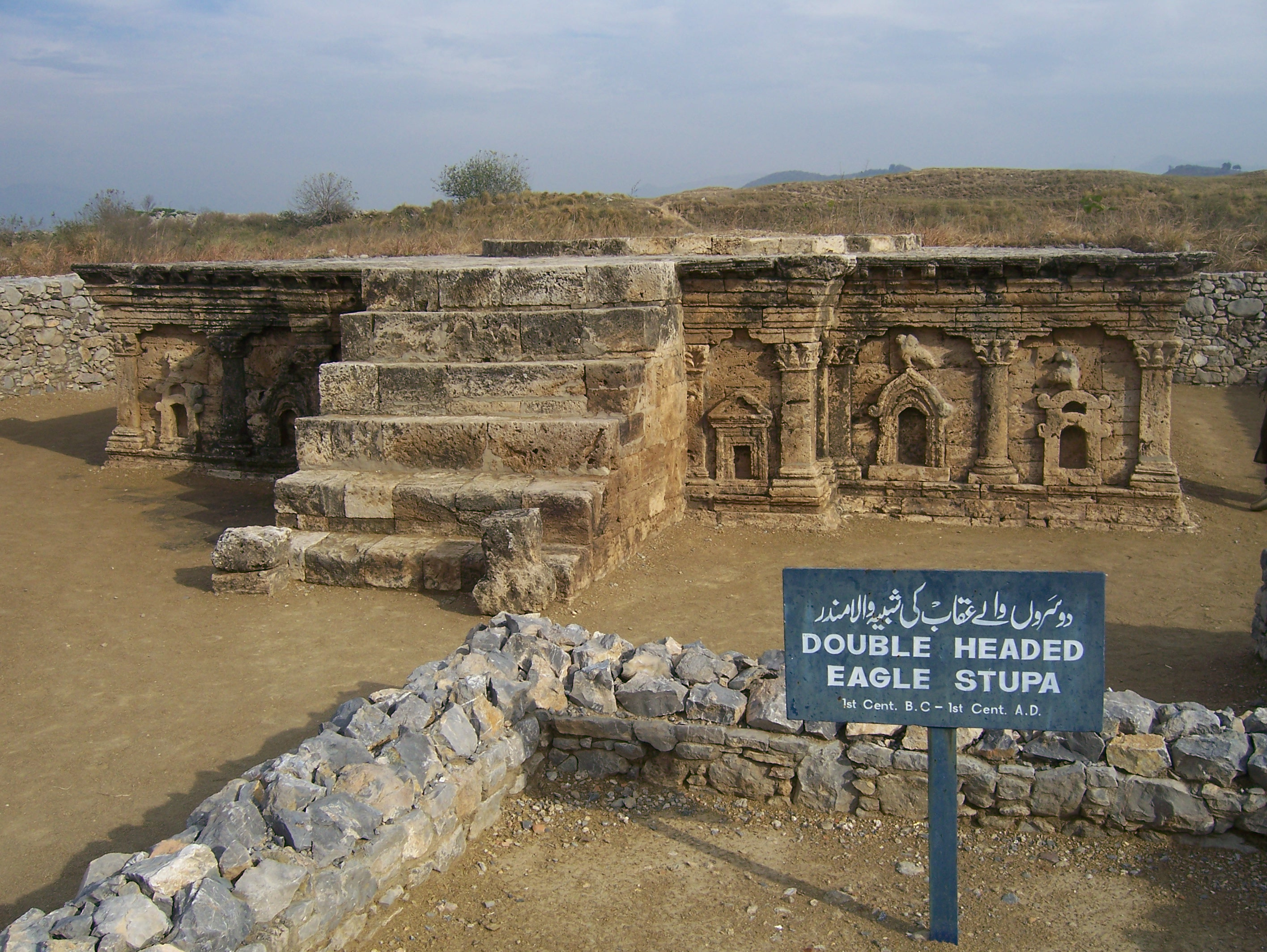
Taxila's ruins, a UNESCO World Heritage Site, date from as early as 1000 BCE.

Taxila is one of northern Pakistan's most important tourist destinations and is home to the Taxila Museum which holds a large number of artifacts from Taxila's excavations. Though the number of foreign visitors to the site drastically declined following the start of an Islamist insurgency in Pakistan in 2007, visitor numbers began to noticeably improve by 2017, after the law and order situation in the region had greatly improved following the start of the 2014 Zarb-e-Azb campaign launched by the Pakistani Army against radical Islamist militants.

In 2017, the Pakistani government announced its intention to develop Taxila into a site for Buddhist religious pilgrimage. As part of the efforts, it announced that an exhibition on the Buddhist heritage of the region would be held in Thailand, and that the Thai government would assist in conservation efforts at the site. Relics from Taxila were also sent to Sri Lanka for the 2017 Vesak holiday as part of an effort to showcase the region's Buddhist heritage. The Pakistan Tourism Development Corporation also announced in 2017 that a tour bus service would be launched between the Taxila Museum and Islamabad.

In addition to the ruins of ancient Taxila, relics of Mughal gardens and vestiges of historical Grand Trunk Road are also found in Taxila. Nicholson's Obelisk, named in honor of Brigadier John Nicholson who died during the Sepoy Mutiny of 1857, is a monument from the British era that welcomes travelers arriving from Rawalpindi/Islamabad.

=== Industry ===
Taxila is home to Heavy Industries Taxila, a major Pakistani defence, military contractor, engineering conglomerate. The city's economy is also closely linked to the large Pakistan Ordnance Factories at nearby Wah Cantt, which employs 27,000 people. Cottage and household industries include stoneware, pottery and footwear. Heavy Mechanical Complex is also located in Taxila city.

== Transportation ==
=== Rail ===
Taxila is served by the Taxila Cantonment Junction railway station. Taxila Junction is served by the Karachi–Peshawar Railway Line, and is the southern terminus of the Khunjerab Railway, which connects Taxila to the Havelian railway station. A planned extension of the railway will eventually connect Taxila to China's Southern Xinjiang Railway in Kashgar, as part of the China–Pakistan Economic Corridor.

=== Road ===
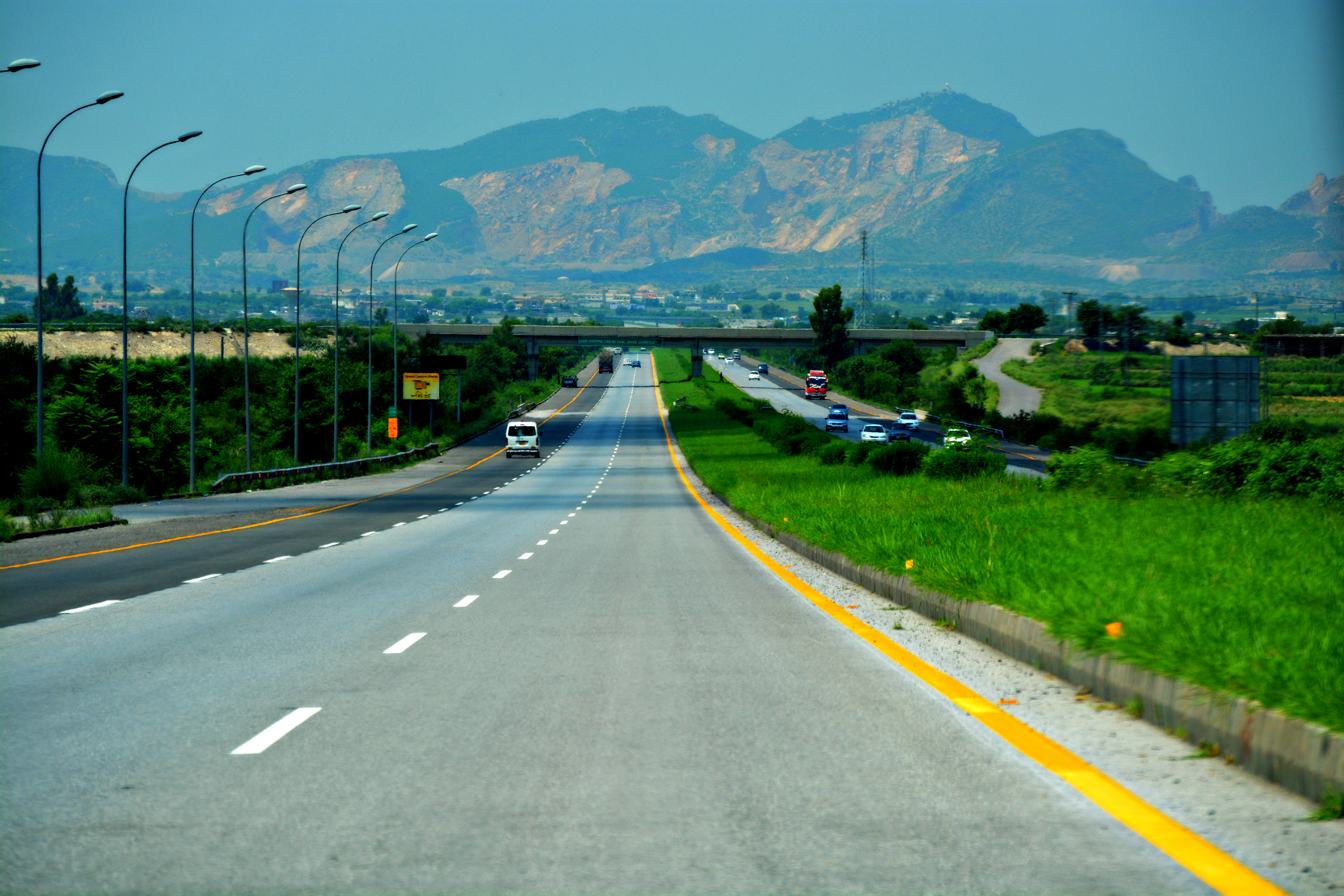
The M-1 Motorway, pictured near Taxila, links the city to Islamabad and Peshawar.

The ancient Grand Trunk Road is designated as N-5 National Highway, and connects the city to the Afghan border, and northern Punjab. The Karakoram Highway's southern terminus is in nearby Hasan Abdal, and connects Taxila to the Chinese border near the Hunza Valley.

The city is linked to Peshawar and Islamabad by the M-1 Motorway, which in turn offers wider motorway access to Lahore via the M-2 Motorway, and Faisalabad via the M-4 Motorway.

=== Air ===
The nearest airport to Taxila is Islamabad International Airport located 36.5 kilometers away. Peshawar's Bacha Khan International Airport is 155 kilometers away.

== Education ==
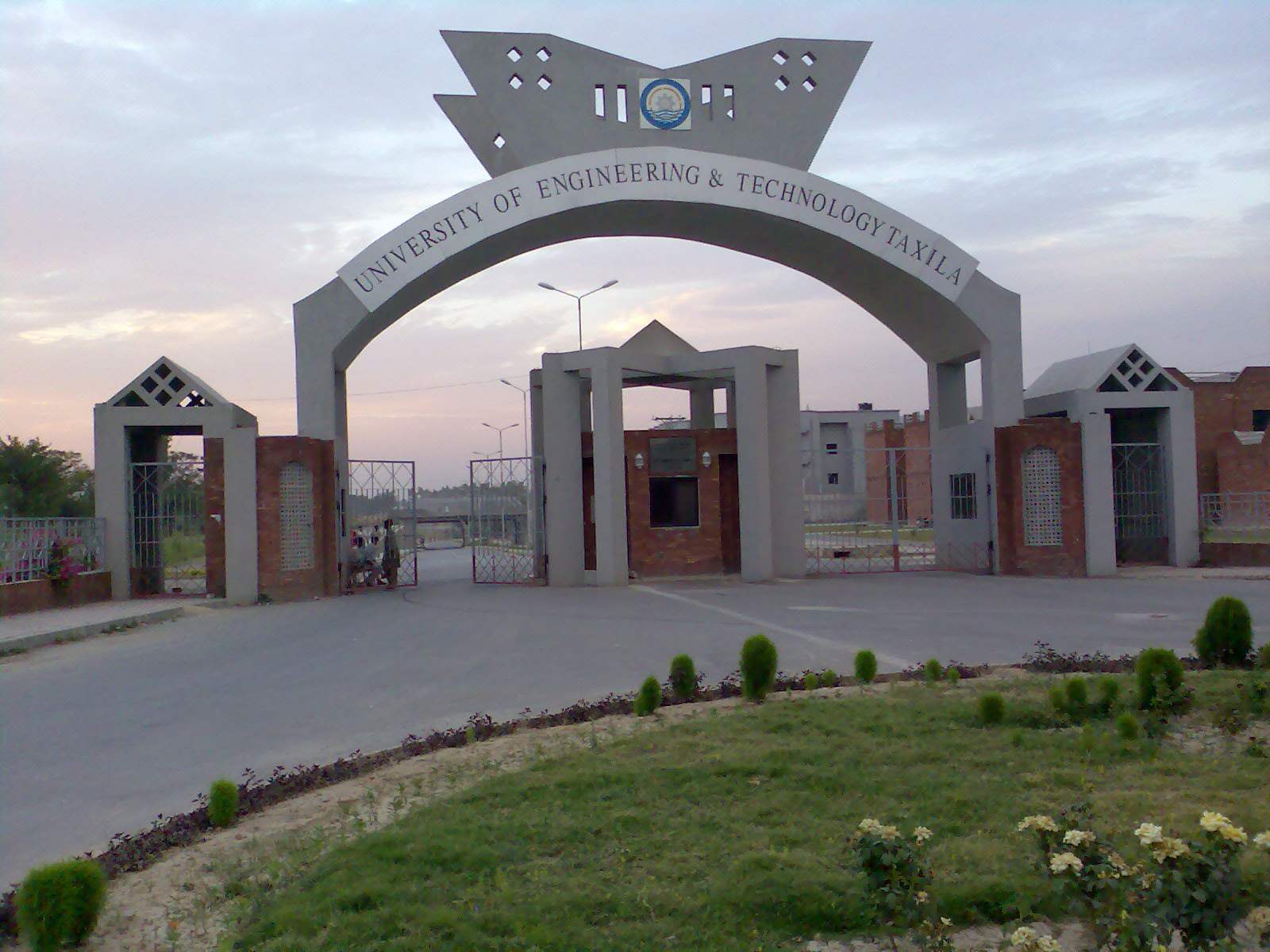
University of Engineering and Technology, Taxila is a local branch of the University of Engineering and Technology, Lahore.

Taxila is home to many secondary educational institutes including CIIT Wah Campus, and HITEC University. The University of Engineering and Technology, Taxila was established in 1975 as a campus of the University of Engineering and Technology, Lahore, and offers bachelor, master, and doctoral degrees in engineering.

== Culture ==
Modern Taxila is a mix of relatively wealthy urban, and poorer rural environs. Urban residential areas are general in the form of planned housing colonies populated by workers of the heavy mechanical complex & heavy industries, educational institutes and hospitals that are located in the area.

=== Museums ===
Taxila Museum has one of the most significant and comprehensive collections of stone Buddhist sculpture from the first to the seventh centuries in Pakistan (known as Gandharan art. The core of the collection comes from excavated sites in the Taxila Valley, particularly the excavations of Sir John Marshall. Other objects come from excavated sites elsewhere in Gandhara, from donations such as the Ram Das Collection, or from material confiscated by law enforcement and customs authorities.

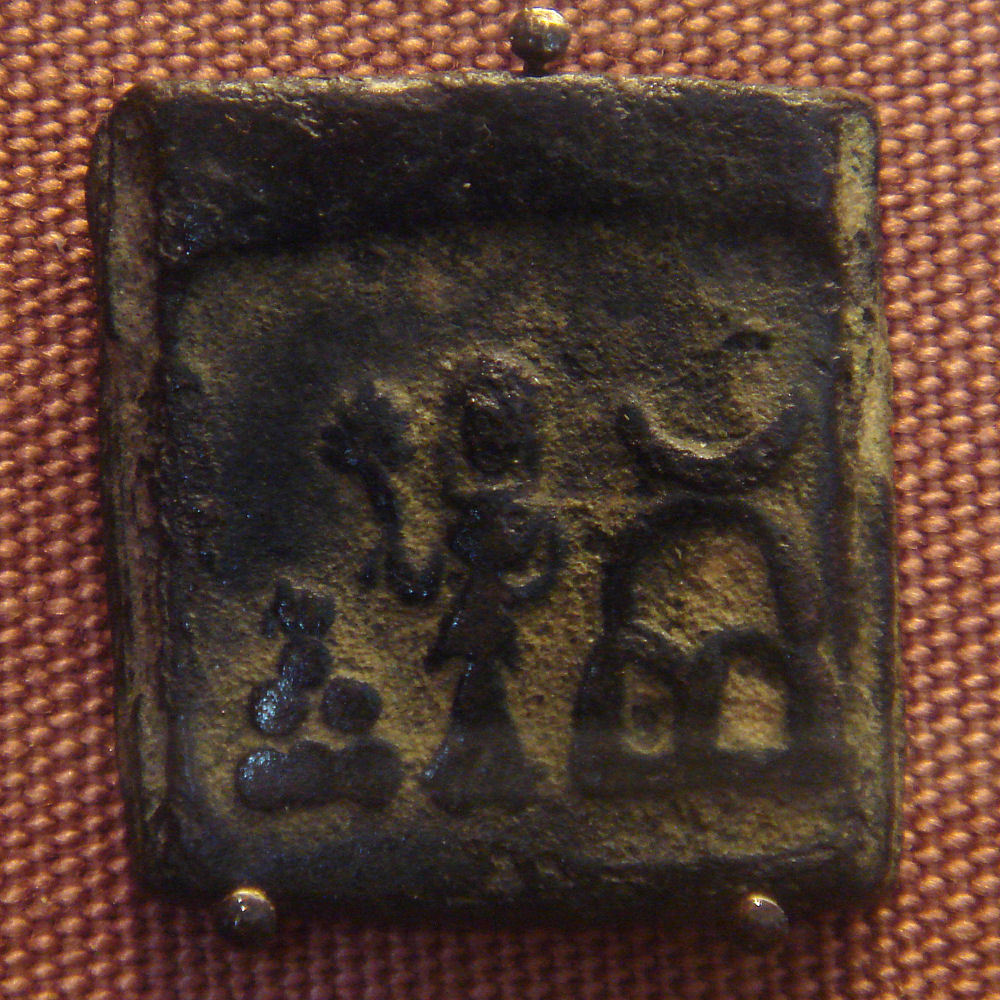
A coin from 2nd century BCE Taxila.

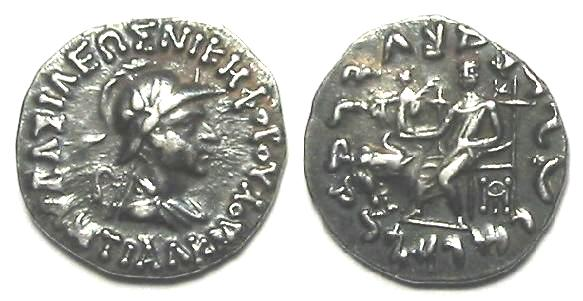
The Indo-Greek king Antialcidas ruled in Taxila around 100 BCE, according to the Heliodorus pillar inscription.

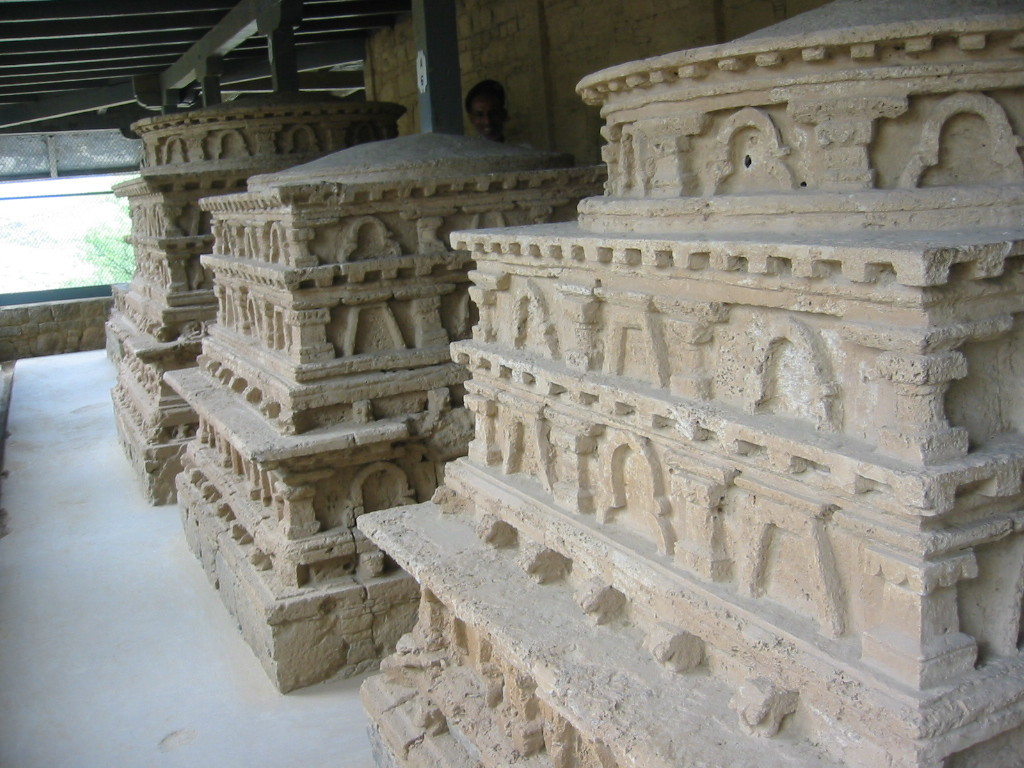
Jaulian, a World Heritage Site at Taxila.

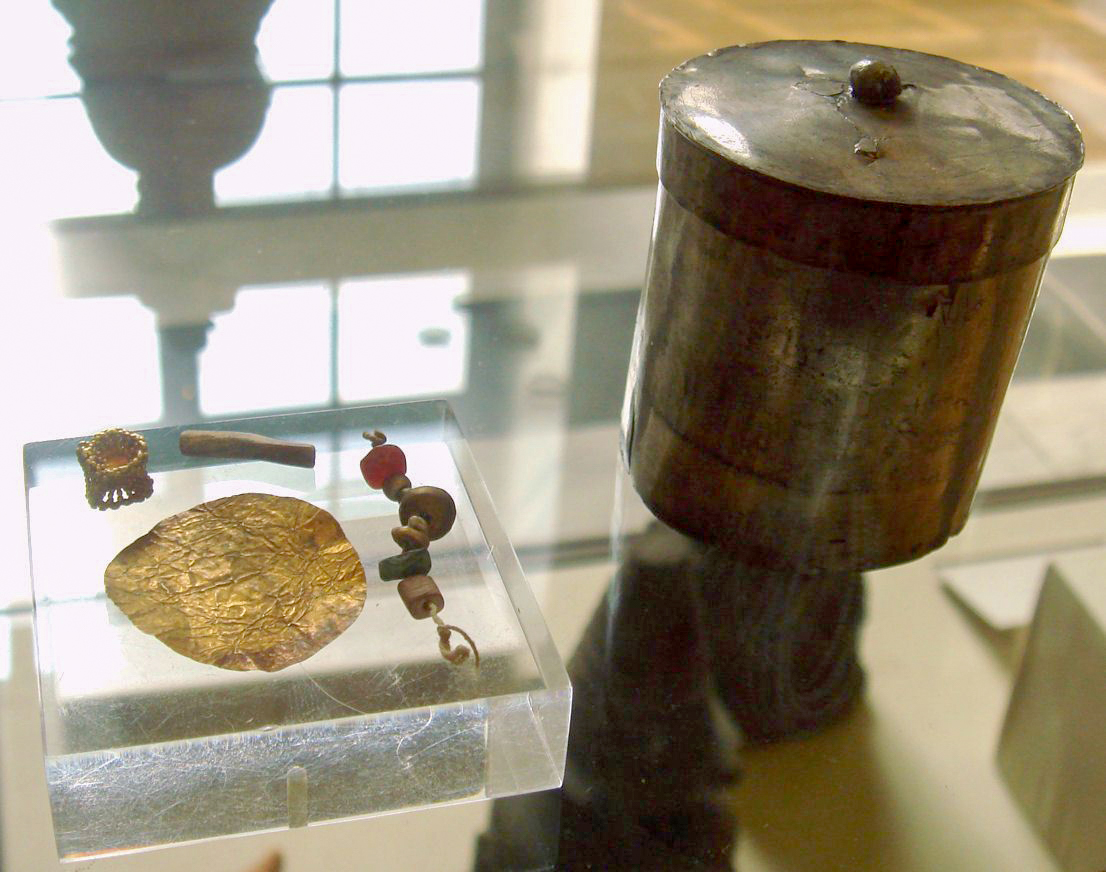
Jaulian silver Buddhist reliquary, with contents. British Museum.

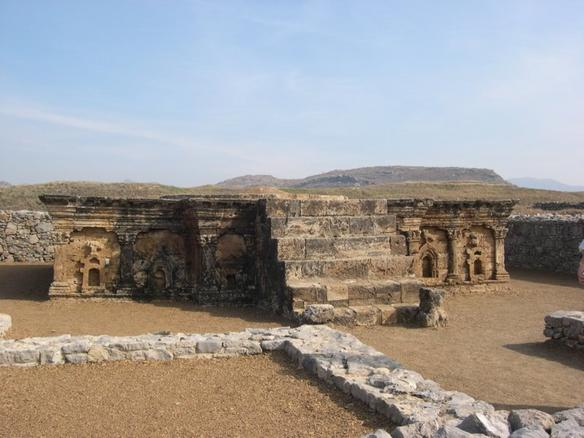
Stupa base at Sirkap, decorated with Hindu, Buddhist and Greek temple fronts.

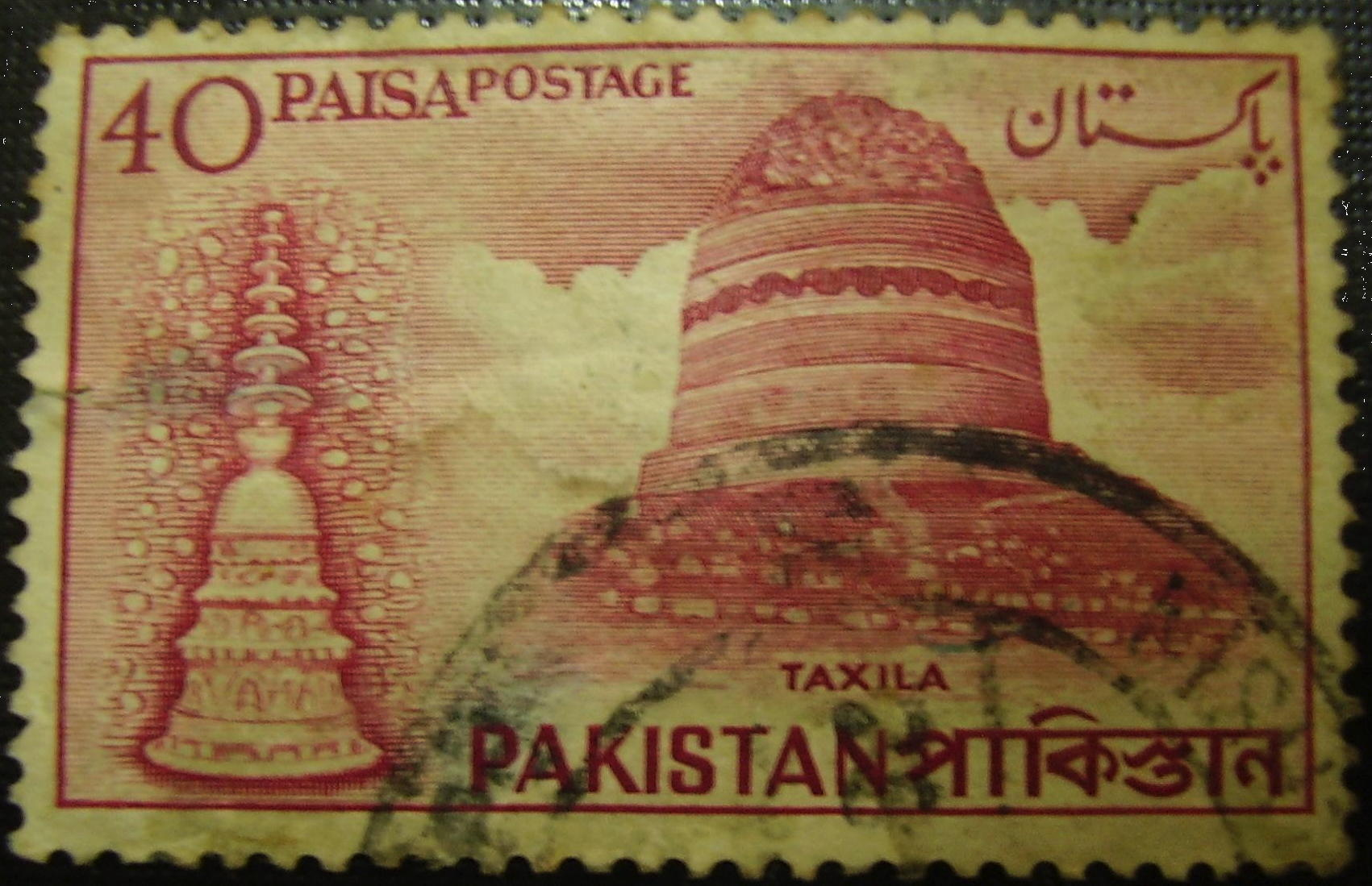
Stupa in Taxila.

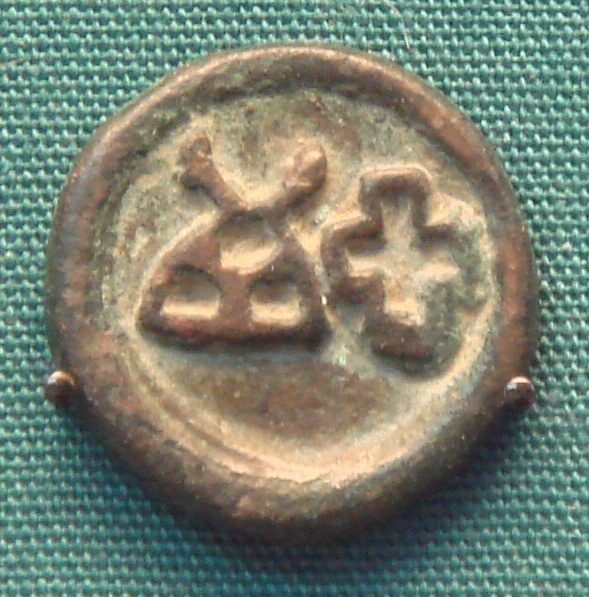
A Taxila coin, 200–100 BCE. British Museum.

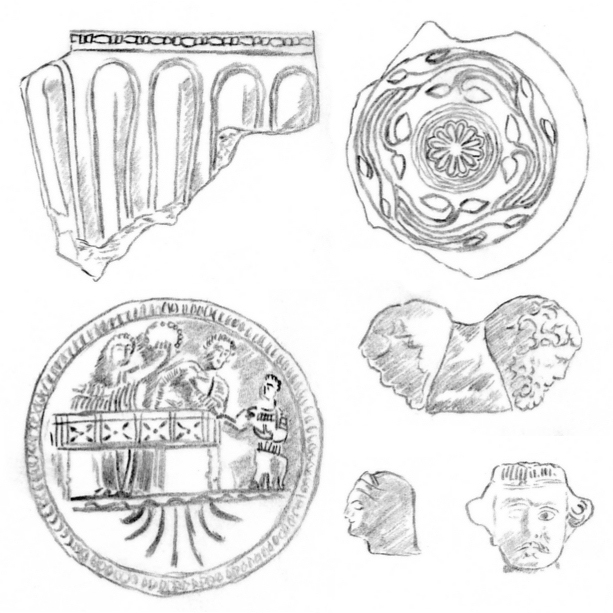
Archaeological artifacts from the Indo-Greek strata at Taxila (John Marshall "Taxila, Archeological excavations"). From top, left: * Fluted cup (Bhir Mound, stratum 1) * Cup with rosacea and decorative scroll (Bhir Mound, stratum 1) * Stone palette with an individual on a couch being crowned by a standing woman, and served (Sirkap, stratum 5) * Handle with a double depiction of a philosopher (Sirkap, stratum 5) * Woman with smile (Sirkap, stratum 5) * Man with moustache (Sirkap, stratum 5)

== See also ==
- Ohind
- Gandhāran Buddhist texts
- Gandharan Buddhism
