= Mujatria =

- Indo-Scythian king
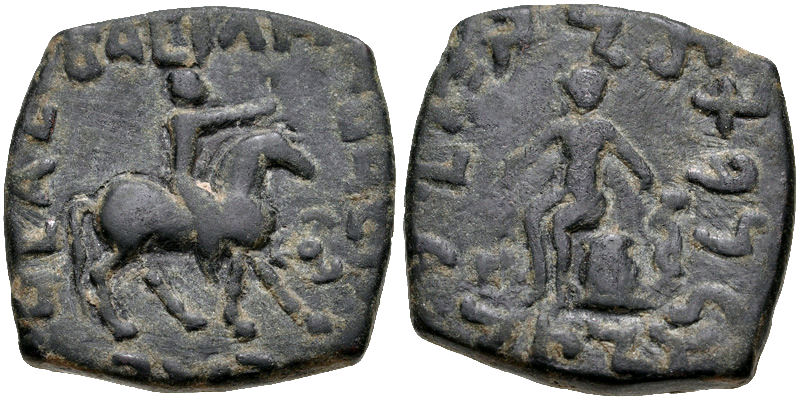
- Coin of Mujatria. Obv. Azes riding, with Greek legend "ΒΑΣΙΛΕΩΝ ΒΑΣΙΛΕΩΝ ΜΕΓΑΛΟΣ ΑΖΟΥ ("Great king of kings Azes") Rev. Kṣatrapasa Kharaosta putrasa Mujatriasa, "Mujatria, son of Satrap Kharahostes", Herakles sitting.
- Reign: c. 10 CE

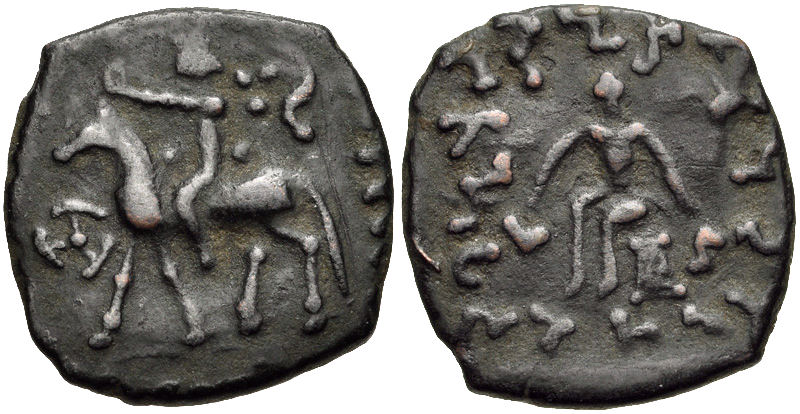
Coin of Mujatria in his own name. Obv Blundered Greek legend with king on horse. Rev Kharoshthi legend Kṣatrapasa Kharaosta putrasa Mujatriasa "Mujatria, son of the Satrap Kharahostes.

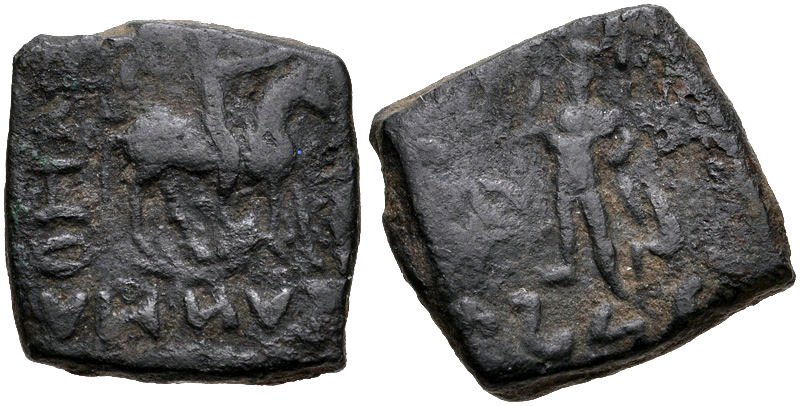
Mujatria coin, deity standing.

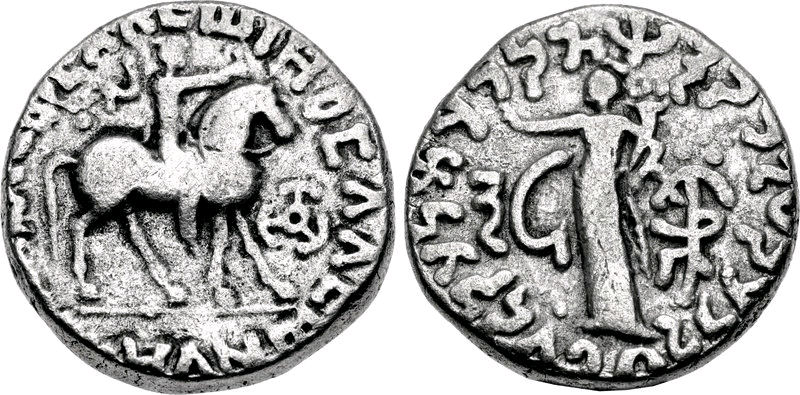
According to Joe Cribb (2015), this coin type, usually attributed to Kharahostes, may belong to his son Mujatria.

Mujatria (Kharosthi: 𐨨𐨂𐨗𐨟𐨿𐨪𐨁𐨀 Mu-ja-tri-a, Mujatria), previously read Hajatria (ruled circa 10 CE, or 40-50 CE according to more recent research based on numismatics), is the name of an Indo-Scythian ruler, the son of Kharahostes as mentioned on his coins.

The archaeologists had discovered coins issued by a "son of Kharahostes," but the actual name of the person had been missing on these coins. The name of the ruler on the coins has finally been read as "Mujatria". His father Kharahostes is known through epigraphical evidence from inscribed reliquaries to have already been a king when the Indravarman Silver Reliquary was dedicated, which is itself positioned with certainty before the 5-6 CE Bajaur casket. Therefore the rule of Kharahostes is usually estimated to 10 BCE- 10CE, which suggests Mujatria would have ruled circa 10 CE- 30 CE.

According to Sten Konow's study of the Mathura lion capital, this person may have been Hayuara, who was the brother-in-law of Rajuvula. He ruled from around 10 CE as a satrap of the Mathura area. He is only known through his coins.

According to Joe Cribb however, the actual Mujiatria was located in the region of Jalalabad in eastern Afghanistan and lived in the later part of the 1st century CE.

A recent study (2015) by Joe Cribb suggests that the round debased silver coins with three-pellet symbols in the name of Azes, usually attributed to his father Kharahostes, should actually be attributed to Mujatria. The Bimaran casket may therefore have been dedicated during the reign of Mujatria.

Overstrikes of the Kushan ruler Wima Takto on Mujatria coins are known. This, together with various hoard finds, suggests the contemporaneity of Mujatria with the Kushan ruler Kujula Kadphises, predecessor of Wima Takto, and the Indo-Scythian ruler Sasan.

== See also ==
- Yuezhi
- Greco-Bactrian Kingdom
- Indo-Greek Kingdom
- Indo-Parthian Kingdom
- Kushan Empire

| Preceded by Kharahostes | Indo-Scythian Ruler; 10 CE | Succeeded by Unknown |

| Territories/ dates | Western India | Western Pakistan Balochistan | Paropamisadae Arachosia | Bajaur | Gandhara | Western Punjab | Eastern Punjab | Mathura |
|---|---|---|---|---|---|---|---|---|
| | | | INDO-GREEK KINGDOM | | | | | |
| 90–85 BCE | | | Nicias | Menander II | | Artemidoros | | |
| 90–70 BCE | | | Hermaeus | Archebius | | | | |
| 85-60 BCE | | | INDO-SCYTHIAN KINGDOM; Maues | | | | | |
| 75–70 BCE | | | Vonones; Spalahores | Telephos | | Apollodotus II | | |
| 65–55 BCE | | | Spalirises; Spalagadames | | | Hippostratos | Dionysios | |
| 55–35 BCE | | | Azes I | | | | Zoilos II | |
| 55–35 BCE | | | Azilises; Azes II | | | | Apollophanes | Indo-Scythian dynasty of the NORTHERN SATRAPS; Hagamasha |
| 25 BCE – 10 CE | | | | Indo-Scythian dynasty of the APRACHARAJAS; Vijayamitra (ruled 12 BCE - 15 CE) (Note: From the dated inscription on the Rukhana reliquary) | Liaka Kusulaka; Patika Kusulaka; Zeionises | Kharahostes (ruled 10 BCE– 10 CE) (Note: An Inscribed Silver Buddhist Reliquary of the Time of King Kharaosta and Prince Indravarman, Richard Salomon, Journal of the American Oriental Society, Vol. 116, No. 3 (Jul. - Sep., 1996), pp. 442); Mujatria | Strato II and Strato III | Hagana |
| 10-20 CE | | INDO-PARTHIAN KINGDOM; Gondophares | | Indravasu | INDO-PARTHIAN KINGDOM; Gondophares | | Rajuvula | |
| 20-30 CE | | | Ubouzanes; Pakores | Vispavarma (ruled c.0-20 CE) (Note: A Kharosthī Reliquary Inscription of the Time of the Apraca Prince Visnuvarma, by Richard Salomon, South Asian Studies 11 1995, Pages 27-32, Published online: 09 Aug 2010) | Sarpedones | | Bhadayasa | Sodasa |
| 30-40 CE | | | KUSHAN EMPIRE; Kujula Kadphises | Indravarma | Abdagases | | ... | ... |
| 40-45 CE | | | | Aspavarma | Gadana | | ... | ... |
| 45-50 CE | | | | Sasan | Sases | | ... | ... |
| 50-75 CE | | | | | | | ... | ... |
| 75-100 CE | Indo-Scythian dynasty of the WESTERN SATRAPS; Chastana | | Vima Takto | | | | ... | ... |
| 100-120 CE | Abhiraka | | Vima Kadphises | | | | ... | ... |
| 120 CE | Bhumaka; Nahapana | PARATARAJAS; Yolamira | Kanishka I | | | | Great Satrap Kharapallana and Satrap Vanaspara for Kanishka I | |
| 130-230 CE | Jayadaman; Rudradaman I Damajadasri I Jivadaman; Rudrasimha I Satyadaman; Jivadaman; Rudrasena I | Bagamira; Arjuna; Hvaramira; Mirahvara | Vāsishka (c. 140 – c. 160); Huvishka (c. 160 – c. 190); Vasudeva I (c. 190 – to at least 230) | | | | | |
| 230-280 CE | Samghadaman; Damasena; Damajadasri II; Viradaman; Isvaradatta; Yasodaman I Vijayasena; Damajadasri III; Rudrasena II; Visvasimha | Miratakhma; Kozana; Bhimarjuna; Koziya; Datarvharna; Datarvharna | INDO-SASANIANS; Ardashir I, Sassanid king and "Kushanshah" (c. 230 – 250); Peroz I, "Kushanshah" (c. 250 – 265); Hormizd I, "Kushanshah" (c. 265 – 295) | | | Kanishka II (c. 230 – 240); Vashishka (c. 240 – 250); Kanishka III (c. 250 – 275) | | |
| 280-300 CE | Bhratadarman | Datayola II | Hormizd II, "Kushanshah" (c. 295 – 300) | | | Vasudeva II (c. 275 – 310) | | |
| 300-320 CE | Visvasena; Rudrasimha II; Jivadaman | | Peroz II, "Kushanshah" (c. 300 – 325) | | | Vasudeva III; Vasudeva IV; Vasudeva V Chhu (c. 310? – 325) | | |
| 320-388 CE | Yasodaman II; Rudradaman II; Rudrasena III; Simhasena; Rudrasena IV | | Shapur II Sassanid king and "Kushanshah" (c. 325); Varhran I, Varhran II, Varhran III "Kushanshahs" (c. 325 – 350); Peroz III "Kushanshah" (c. 350 –360); HEPHTHALITE/ HUNAS invasions | | | Shaka I (c. 325 – 345); Kipunada (c. 345 – 375) | | GUPTA EMPIRE; Chandragupta I Samudragupta |
| 388-395 CE | Rudrasimha III | | Chandragupta II | | | | | |
