= Nadasi Kasa =

Nadasi Kasa (also Nadasi Akasa, Nadadi Akasa, or Nada Diaka) was a queen of the Indo-Scythian mahakshatrapa Rajuvula, daughter of Aiyasi Kamuia. She finds mention in inscription no A-5 of the Mathura Lion Capital. F. W. Thomas has read this name as Nadadi (Nadasi)- Akasa, Dr Bühler however, has read it as Nadasia Kasaye, but Sten Konow, on the other hand, reads it as Nada Diaka.

== See also ==
- Kamuia
- Arta
- Aiyasi Kamuia
- Kharaosta Kamuio or Kharahostes
- Maues
- Rajuvula
