= Saptarishi Tila statue =

Ancient statue of a woman in India

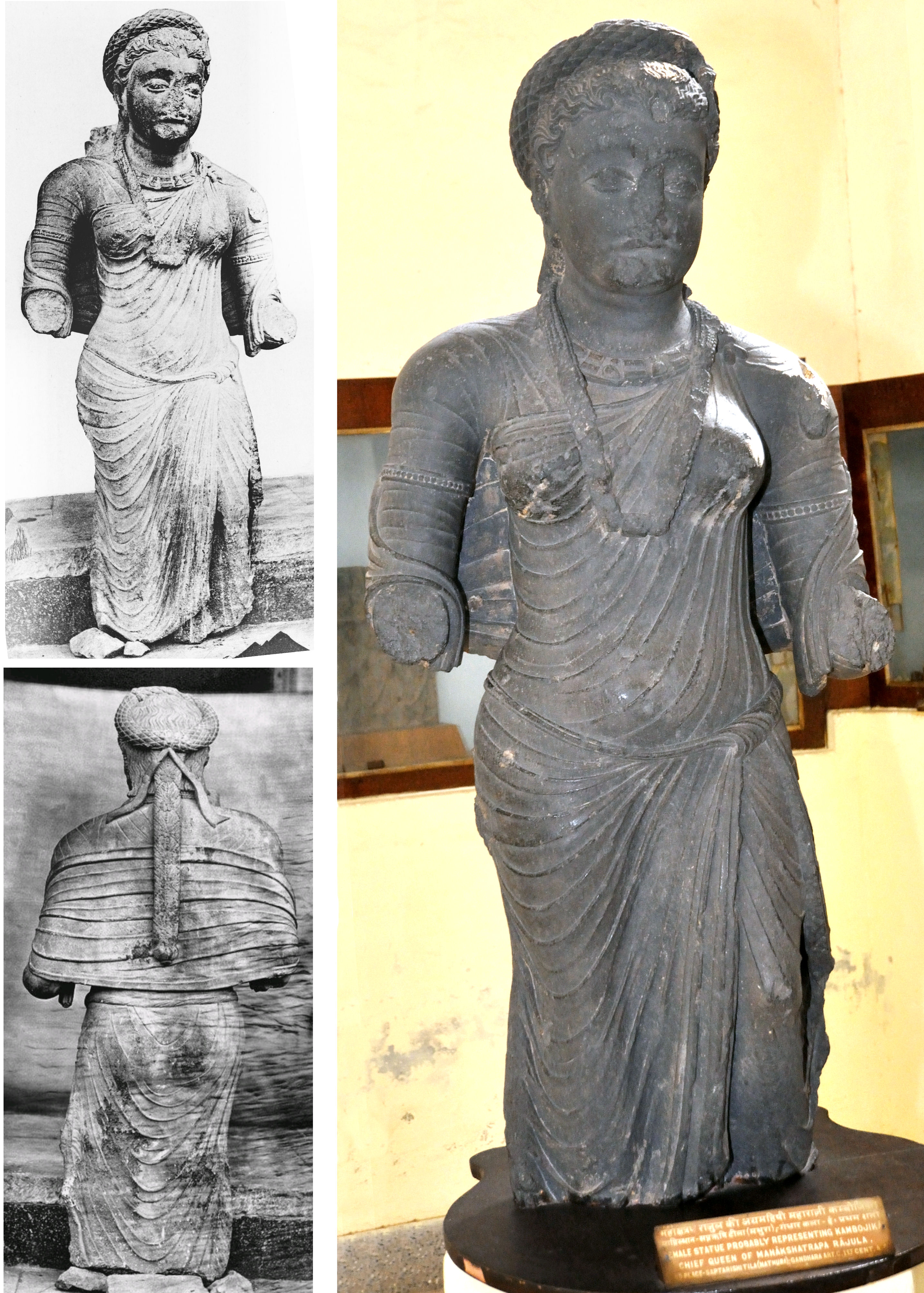
- Female Statue possibly representing Kambojika, the Chief Queen of Mahakshatrapa Rajula (Kamboj). Found in the Saptarishi Mound, the same mound where the Mathura lion capital was found. Circa 1st century CE. Other angles.
- Material: Blue schist
- Size: life-size
- Period/culture: 1st century CE
- Discovered: 27°36′00″N 77°39′00″E
- Place: Saptarishi Mound, Mathura, India.
- Present location: Mathura Museum

Location

The Saptarishi Tila statue, also called the Kambojika statue, is a statue of a woman found in the Saptarishi mound ("Saptarishi Tila") in Mathura. The statue is life-size and is now in the Mathura Museum. The statue was discovered by Bhagawanlal Indraji, at the same time and place as another important artifact, the Mathura lion capital, dated to the beginning of the 1st century CE.

The statue wears a sleeved blouse, a full skirt, and a torque and necklace like those of the Kamboj Bodhisattvas.

== Origin ==
The statue is an example of the Greco-Buddhist art of Gandhara. It is made of the blue schist of Gandhara, and closely follows its style. Its excavation in Mathura shows that the Greco-Buddhist art of Gandhara was finding its way in Mathura, thereby potentially influencing local art. This statue demonstrates the close ties between the art of Gandhara and the art of Mathura. This has implications regarding the time and place of the creation of the first Buddha images. The datation of the statue also is significant. It is regularly presented as a piece of art of the 1st century CE.

== Interpretation ==
=== Kamuia, Queen of Rajuvula ===
Since the statue was found in the same mound as the Mathura lion capital, many authors have interpreted it as being a statue of the First Queen of Rajuvula, Kamuia Ayasa, also called Kambojika. This is also the interpretation of the Mathura Museum, the notice of which says she is "probably Kambojika, the Chief Queen of Rajuvula". According to Rosenfield, in order for it to be a statue of Kamuia Ayasa, it would have had to be made in the early 1st century CE, which is unlikely, given our knowledge of Gandharan statuary, generally dated to the 2nd century at the earliest.

=== Hariti ===
Other authors interpret the statue of the goddess Hariti.

A remain of a child hand can be seen on the left arms, which supports the identification of the statue as Hariti.

Hariti statues from Gandhara
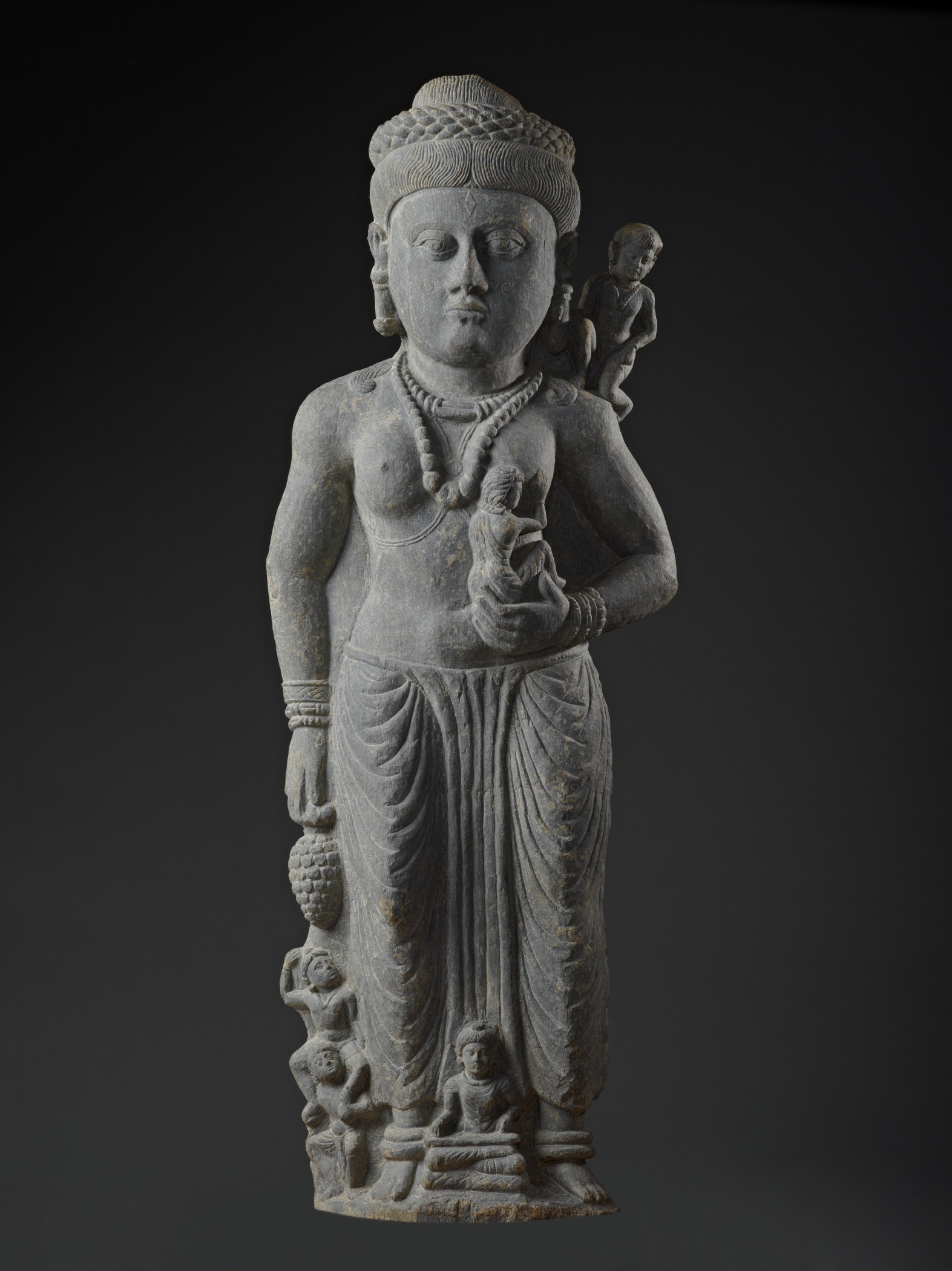
Hariti with children (front). 1st BCE, Gandhara.

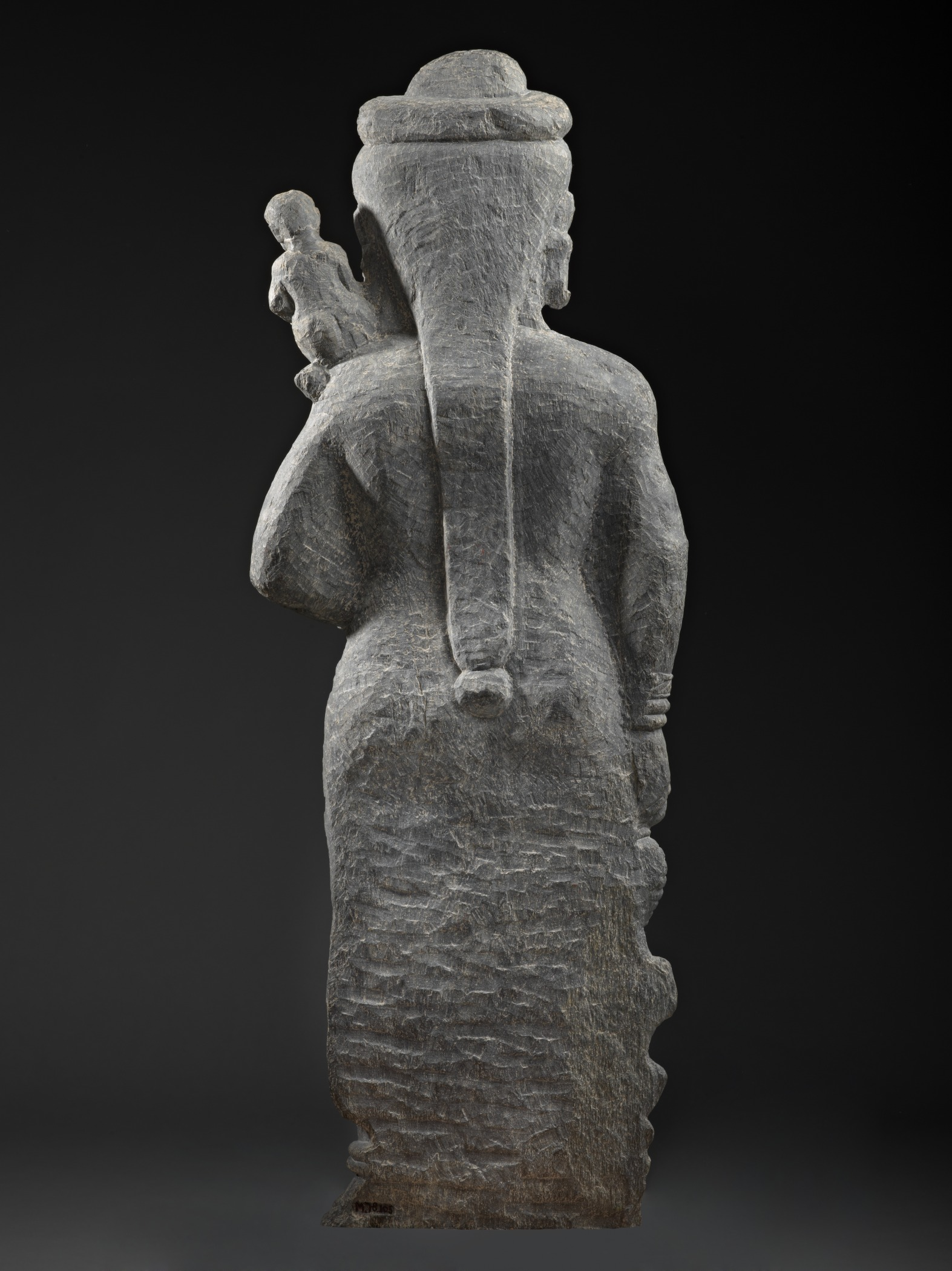
Hariti with children (back). 1st BCE, Gandhara.

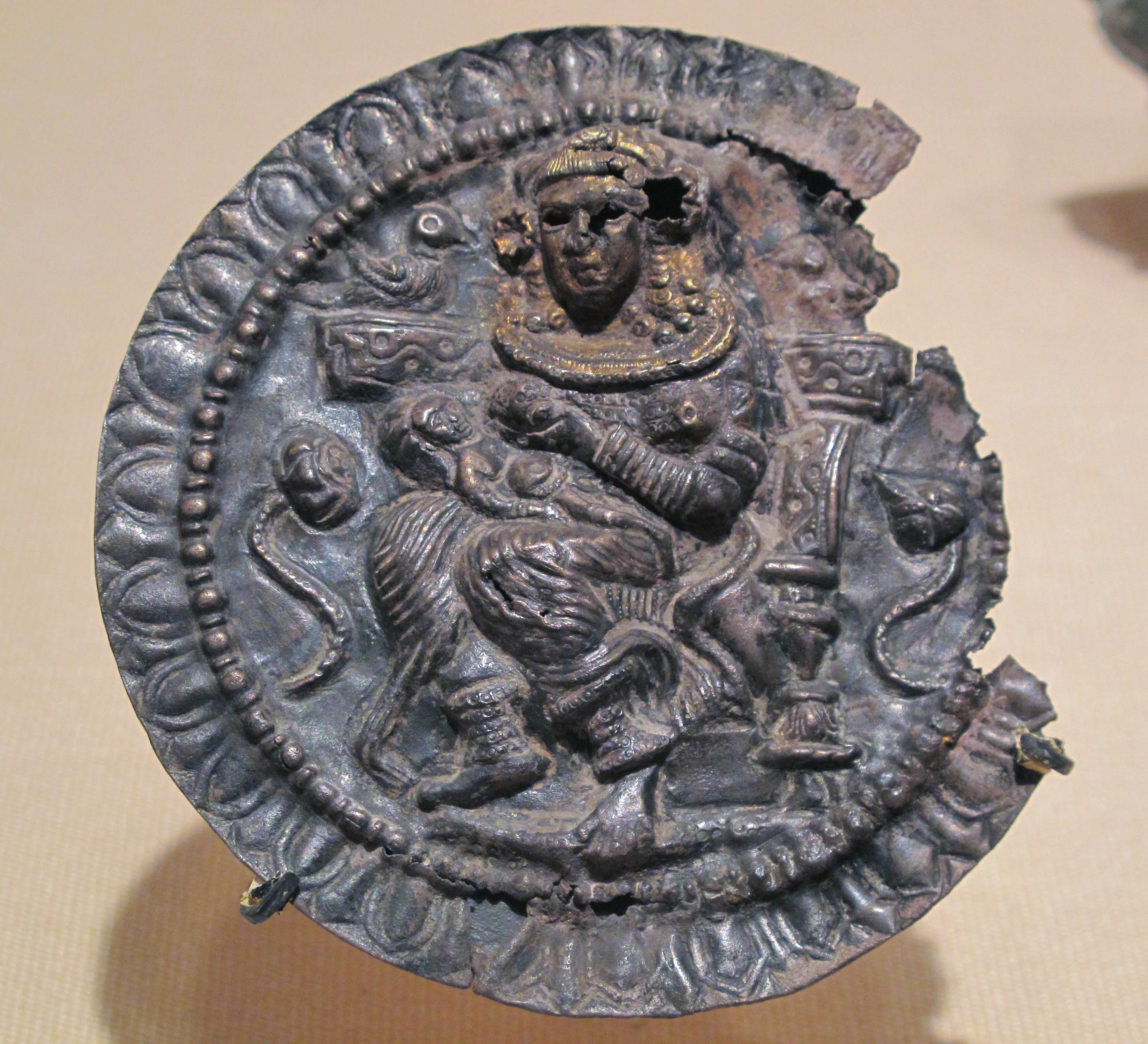
Rondel with the Goddess Hariti, 1st century CE.

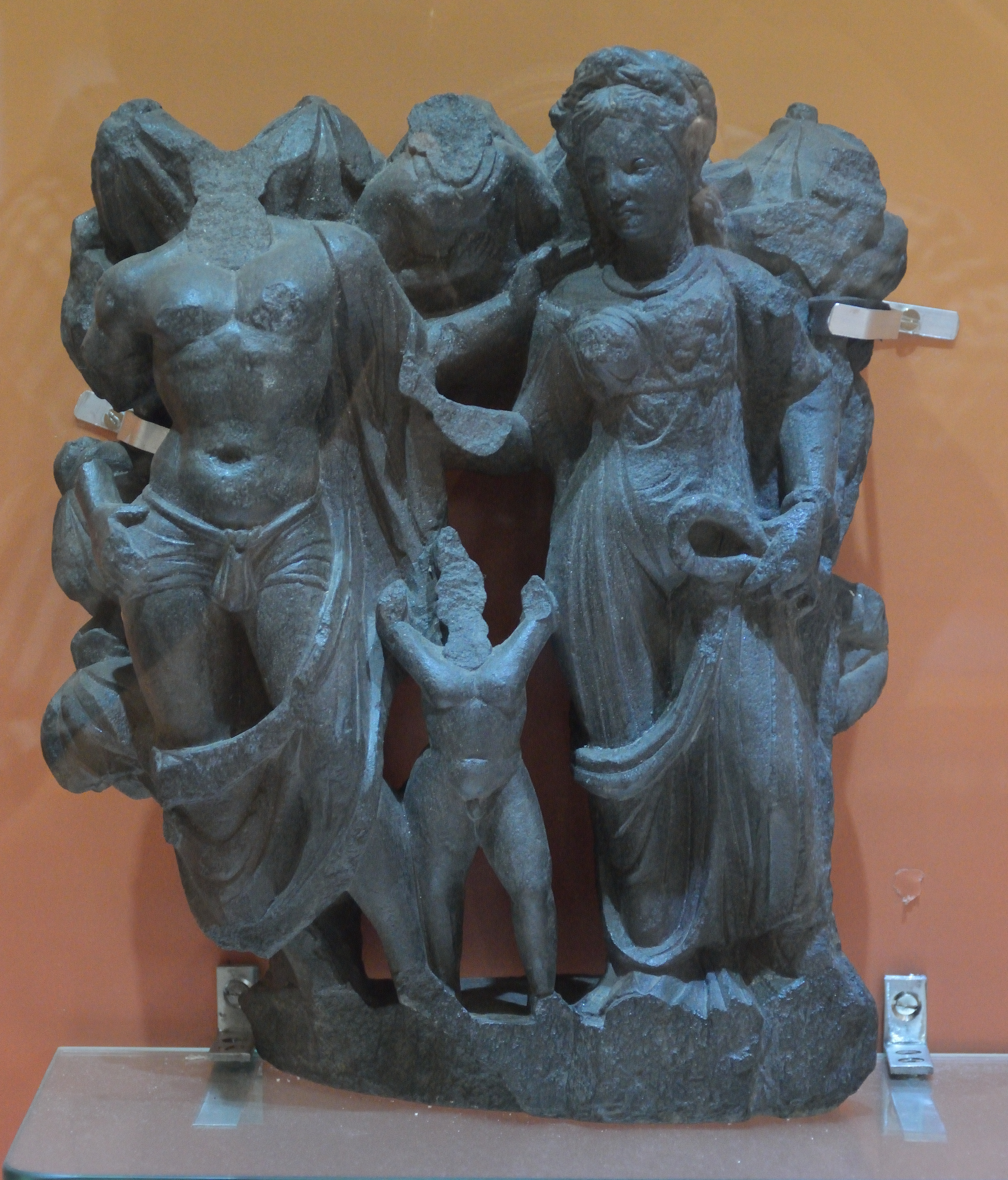
Hariti and Panchika, c. 2nd Century CE - Gandhara

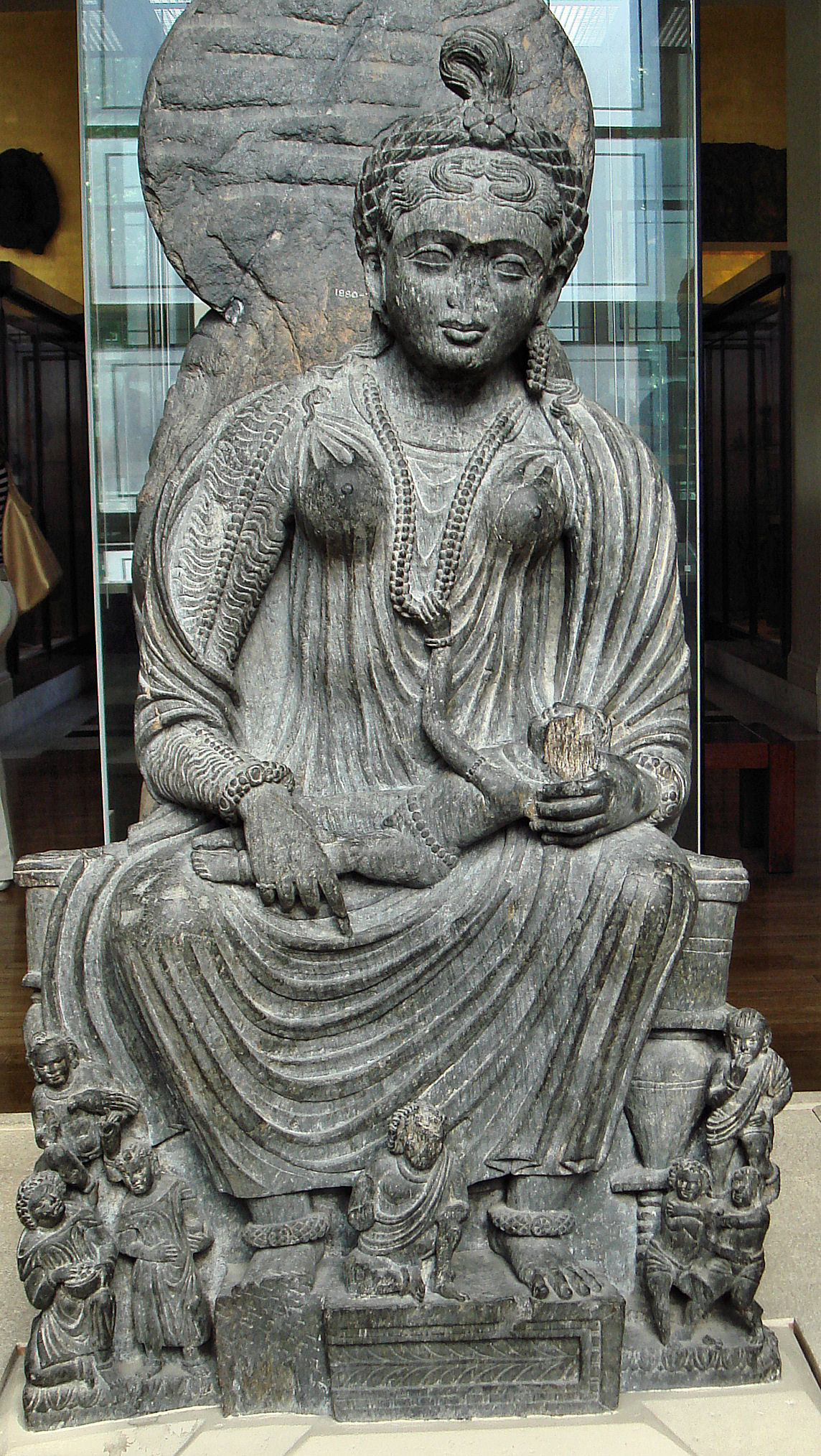
Goddess Hariti with baby.

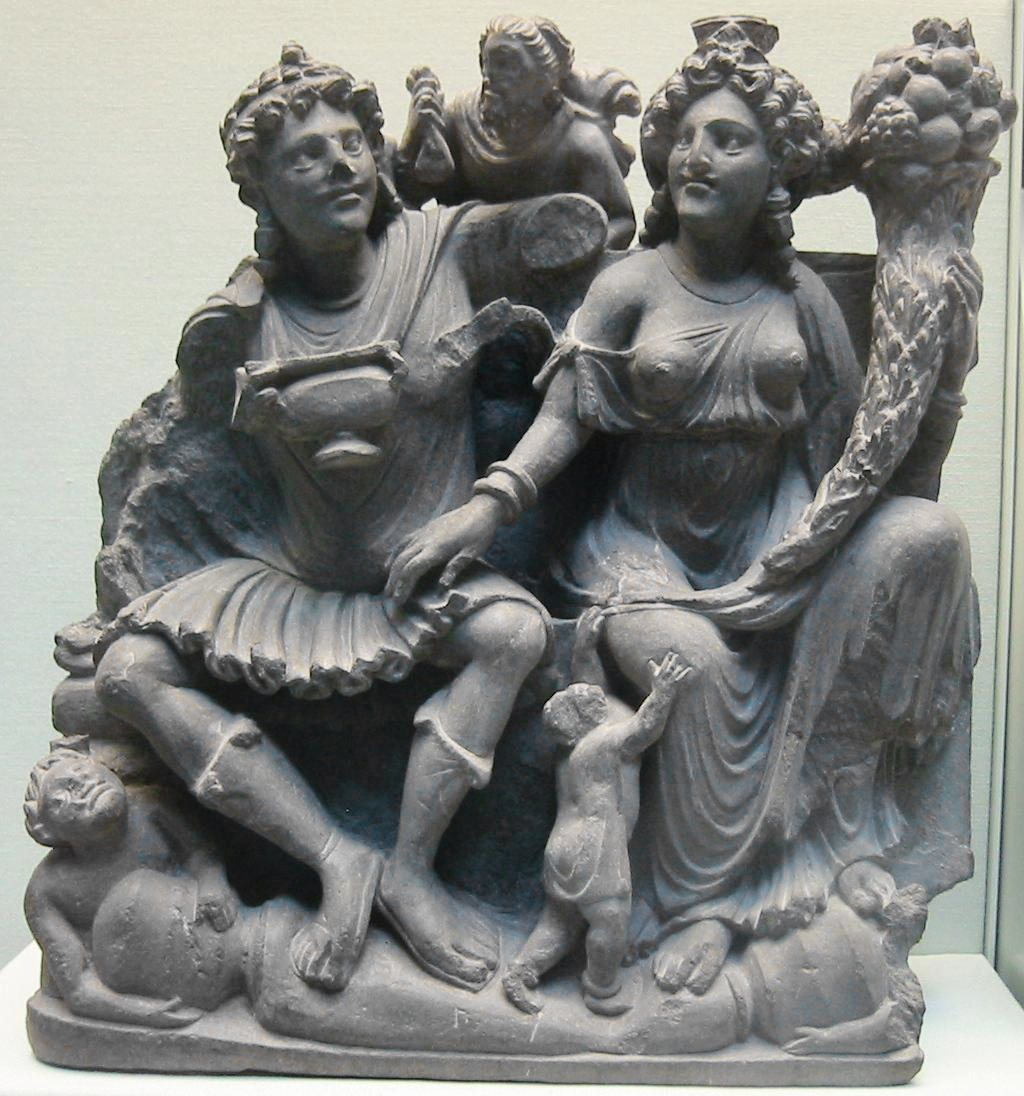
Pharo and Ardoxsho, Gandhara.

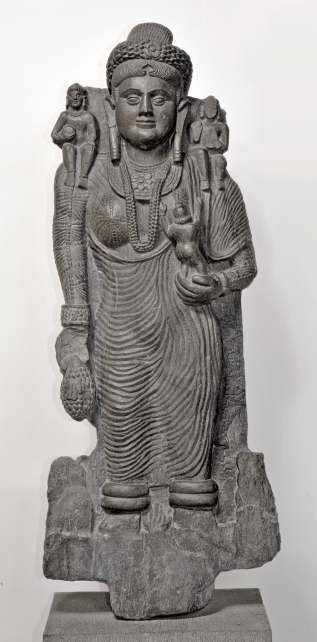
Hariti (Gandhara).

== See also ==
- Kambojas
