= Arta (Kamuia) =

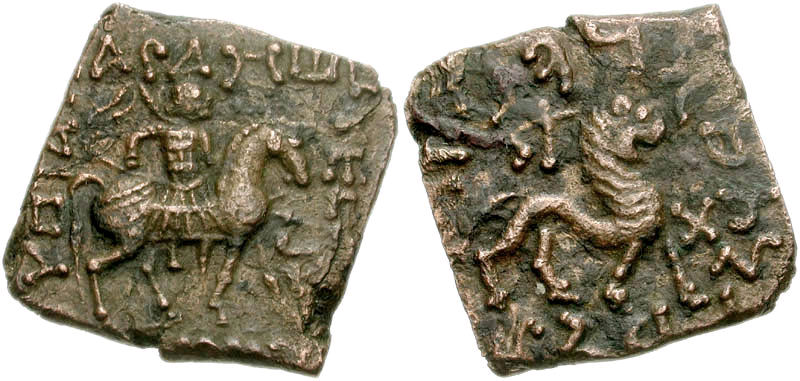
A coin of Kharahostes (c. 10 BCE) as son of Arta Kumia. Obverse: King on horseback, with levelled spear. Greek legend XAPAHWCTEI CATPAΠEI ARTAYOY ("Satrap Kharahostes, son of Arta"). Kharoahthi mint mark sam Reverse: Lion. Kharoshthi legend Chatrapasa pra Kharaustasa Artasa putrasa ("Satrap Kharahostes, son of Arta").

Arta (Greek: Άρτα Árta, ΑΡΤΑΥΟΥ Artauou (epigraphic); Kharoshthi: 𐨀𐨪𐨿𐨚 A-rṭa, Arṭa) was the elder brother of the well known Gandhara ruler Maues or Moga.

== Name ==
Arta's name is attested in the Greek form Árta (Άρτα) and in the Kharosthi form Arṭa (𐨀𐨪𐨿𐨚), which are derived from the Saka name *Arθya, meaning "pious".

== Scholarly view ==
Kharahostes's own coins attest that Kshatrapa Kharaostes was the son of Arta:

Kshatrapasa pra Kharaostasa Artasa putrasa (i.e. Kshatrapa Kharaosta, son of Arta).

Some of Kharaosta's known coins write Ortas instead of Artas.

Scholars state that Yuvaraja Kharaosta Kamuio of the Lion Capital Inscriptions is the same as Kshatrapa Kharaosta, whose coins have been studied by Dr Rapson and Dr Luders. It is now generally agreed that Kshatrapa Kharaosta was son Arta, and that Yuvaraja Kharaosta and Kshatrapa Kharaosta were one and same historical personage.

The Inscriptions A and E on the Mathura Lion Capital style Kharaosta as Yuvaraya Kharaosta Kamuio.

Based on the estimates of the relative ages of various personages portrayed in Lion Capital Inscriptions, Dr Stein Konow has determined that Yuvaraja Kharaosta Kamuio (i.e. son of Arta) was the father of Aiyasi Kamuia, the chief queen (Agra-Mahisi) of Saka Mahakshatrapa Rajuvula. See also: .

An older view was that Arta, the father of Kharaosta, was the first husband of Rajuvula's chief queen who had married Rajuvula after Arta's death. However, Dr S Konow does not accept this view. The fact that last name Kamuia has been used both by Yuvaraja Kharaosta as well as by princess Aiyasi clearly proves that Aiyasi Kamuia was the daughter and not mother of Yuvaraja Kharaosta Kamuio, since it is the father's and not mother's lineage which is adopted by their off-springs.

It appears that Arta had died before the date of writing of the Mathura Lion Capital inscriptions.

Yuvaraja Kharaosta Kamuio, therefore, was the legitimate inheritor to the position as King of Kings for the kingdom of Gandhara after king Moga.

Saka governor Rajuvula had married princess Aiyasi Kamuia, daughter of Yuvaraja Kharaosta Kamuio, probably to strengthen his political position and also his claim to the throne (of Taxila).

This prospect was obviously not liked by other Saka chiefs. This appears to be the reason as to why the title of Shahanshahi was discontinued and only the titles of Kshatrapa and Mahakshtarpa obtained among the Sakas from that time onwards. These Sakas later organized a Samgha under Rajuvula and Patika when Rajuvula assumed the title of Maha-Ksatrapa for the first time.

It appears, for some reasons, that Yuvaraja Kharaosta Kamuio did not avail the position of King of Kings after Moga's death.

Many scholars including Sten Konow, H. W. Bailey, R. K. Mukerjee, K. P. Jaiswal, J. L. Kamboj, Buddha Prakash and others recognise that the names Kamuia and Kamuio (q.v) of the Mathura Lion Capital Inscriptions are the Kharoshthi/Prakritic forms of Sanskrit/Pali Kambojika or Kamboja.

Hence according to one school of scholars, king Maues, his brother Arta, Kharaosta Kamuio and Kharaosta's daughter Aiyasi Kamuia --- all belonged to the Kambojika or Kamboja clan or lineage.

== Mahaksatrapa Arta of the Inscribed Silver Buddhist Reliquary ==
A recently discovered "Inscribed Silver Buddhist Reliquary", found from Shinkot in Bajaur (Pakistan), and edited and published for the first time by Richard Saloman, in Journal of the American Oriental Society (July- September 1996), refers to a king named Kharayosta, believed to belong to the later quarter of first century BCE. According to its editor Dr Richard Salomon (University of Washington), king Kharayosta of the "Inscribed Silver Buddhist Reliquary", in all probability, is the same Kharaosta who finds reference as Yuvaraja Kharosta in the Mathura Lion Capital inscriptions as well as, as Kharaostasa or Kharahostes in the coins.

== See also ==
- Kamuia
- Aiyasi Kamuia
- Kharaosta Kamuio
- Maues
- Kambojas
- Parama-Kambojas
- Rishikas
