= Hagana (satrap) =

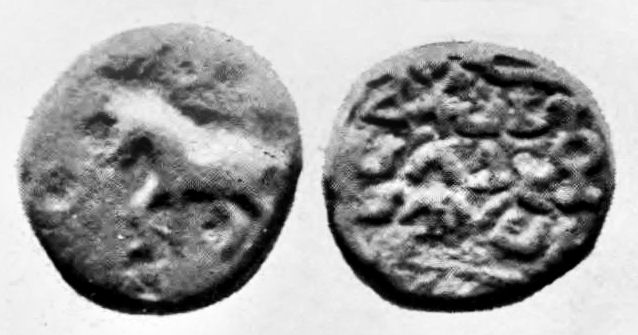
Joint coin of Hagana and Hagamasha. Obv.: Horse to left. Rev. Thunderbolt, legend Khatapāna Hagānasa Hagāmashasa. 1st century BCE.

Hagana (Ha-gā-na, Hagāna) was an Indo-Scythian Northern Satrap (ruled in Mathura in the 1st century BCE, probably after 60 BCE).

== Name ==
Hagana's name is attested on his coins in the Brahmi form Hagāna, which is derived from the Saka name *Frakāna, meaning "leader, chief".

== Reign ==
In central India, the Indo-Scythians are thought to have conquered the area of Mathura over Indian kings around 60 BCE, thus founding the Northern Satraps. Some of their first satraps were Hagamasha and Hagana, who were in turn followed by Rajuvula, but according to some authors, Rajuvula may have been first.

Territories/ dates	Western India	Western Pakistan Balochistan	Paropamisadae Arachosia	Bajaur	Gandhara	Western Punjab	Eastern Punjab	Mathura
			INDO-GREEK KINGDOM					
90–85 BCE			Nicias	Menander II		Artemidoros		
90–70 BCE			Hermaeus	Archebius				
85-60 BCE			INDO-SCYTHIAN KINGDOM; Maues					
75–70 BCE			Vonones; Spalahores	Telephos		Apollodotus II		
65–55 BCE			Spalirises; Spalagadames			Hippostratos	Dionysios	
55–35 BCE			Azes I				Zoilos II	
55–35 BCE			Azilises; Azes II				Apollophanes	Indo-Scythian dynasty of the NORTHERN SATRAPS; Hagamasha
25 BCE – 10 CE				Indo-Scythian dynasty of the APRACHARAJAS; Vijayamitra (ruled 12 BCE - 15 CE) (Note: From the dated inscription on the Rukhana reliquary)	Liaka Kusulaka; Patika Kusulaka; Zeionises	Kharahostes (ruled 10 BCE– 10 CE) (Note: An Inscribed Silver Buddhist Reliquary of the Time of King Kharaosta and Prince Indravarman, Richard Salomon, Journal of the American Oriental Society, Vol. 116, No. 3 (Jul. - Sep., 1996), pp. 442); Mujatria	Strato II and Strato III	Hagana
10-20 CE		INDO-PARTHIAN KINGDOM; Gondophares		Indravasu	INDO-PARTHIAN KINGDOM; Gondophares		Rajuvula	
20-30 CE			Ubouzanes; Pakores	Vispavarma (ruled c.0-20 CE) (Note: A Kharosthī Reliquary Inscription of the Time of the Apraca Prince Visnuvarma, by Richard Salomon, South Asian Studies 11 1995, Pages 27-32, Published online: 09 Aug 2010)	Sarpedones		Bhadayasa	Sodasa
30-40 CE			KUSHAN EMPIRE; Kujula Kadphises	Indravarma	Abdagases		...	...
40-45 CE				Aspavarma	Gadana		...	...
45-50 CE				Sasan	Sases		...	...
50-75 CE							...	...
75-100 CE	Indo-Scythian dynasty of the WESTERN SATRAPS; Chastana		Vima Takto				...	...
100-120 CE	Abhiraka		Vima Kadphises				...	...
120 CE	Bhumaka; Nahapana	PARATARAJAS; Yolamira	Kanishka I				Great Satrap Kharapallana and Satrap Vanaspara for Kanishka I	
130-230 CE	Jayadaman; Rudradaman I Damajadasri I Jivadaman; Rudrasimha I Satyadaman; Jivadaman; Rudrasena I	Bagamira; Arjuna; Hvaramira; Mirahvara	Vāsishka (c. 140 – c. 160); Huvishka (c. 160 – c. 190); Vasudeva I (c. 190 – to at least 230)					
230-280 CE	Samghadaman; Damasena; Damajadasri II; Viradaman; Isvaradatta; Yasodaman I Vijayasena; Damajadasri III; Rudrasena II; Visvasimha	Miratakhma; Kozana; Bhimarjuna; Koziya; Datarvharna; Datarvharna	INDO-SASANIANS; Ardashir I, Sassanid king and "Kushanshah" (c. 230 – 250); Peroz I, "Kushanshah" (c. 250 – 265); Hormizd I, "Kushanshah" (c. 265 – 295)			Kanishka II (c. 230 – 240); Vashishka (c. 240 – 250); Kanishka III (c. 250 – 275)		
280-300 CE	Bhratadarman	Datayola II	Hormizd II, "Kushanshah" (c. 295 – 300)			Vasudeva II (c. 275 – 310)		
300-320 CE	Visvasena; Rudrasimha II; Jivadaman		Peroz II, "Kushanshah" (c. 300 – 325)			Vasudeva III; Vasudeva IV; Vasudeva V Chhu (c. 310? – 325)		
320-388 CE	Yasodaman II; Rudradaman II; Rudrasena III; Simhasena; Rudrasena IV		Shapur II Sassanid king and "Kushanshah" (c. 325); Varhran I, Varhran II, Varhran III "Kushanshahs" (c. 325 – 350); Peroz III "Kushanshah" (c. 350 –360); HEPHTHALITE/ HUNAS invasions			Shaka I (c. 325 – 345); Kipunada (c. 345 – 375)		GUPTA EMPIRE; Chandragupta I Samudragupta
388-395 CE	Rudrasimha III		Chandragupta II					
