= Kharahostes =

Indo-Scythian king who ruled in northern India (r. c.10 BCE-c.10 CE)

- Indo-Scythian king
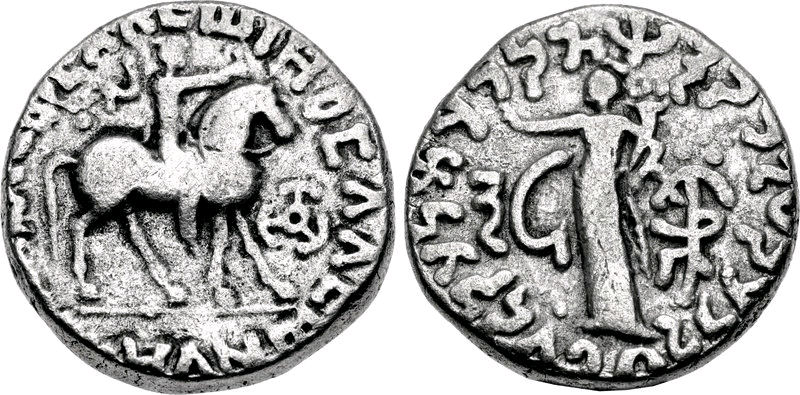
- Coin of Kharahostes (or possibly his son Mujatria), in the name of Azes. Obv. Azes riding, with corrupted Greek legend (ωΕΙΛΟN ωΕΟΛΛωN ΙΟϹΑΑϹ) for ΒΑΣΙΛΕΩΣ ΒΑΣΙΛΕΩΝ ΑΖΟΥ "King of Kings Azes", and Buddhist Triratna symbol behind the head of the king. Rev. City goddess Tyche standing left holding cornucopia and raised right hand. Kharoshthi legend Maharajasa mahatasa Dhramakisa Rajatirajasa Ayasa "The Great king followower of the Dharma, King of Kings Azes"
- Reign: 10 BCE – 10 CE

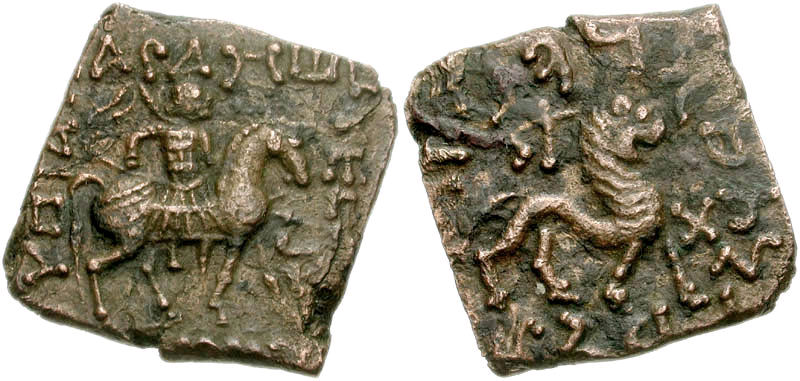
Coin of Kharahostes "son of Arta". The three-pellet symbol does not appear. Obverse: King on horseback, with levelled spear. Greek legend ΧΑΡΑΗωϹΤΕΙ ϹΑΤΡΑΠΕΙ ΑΡΤΑΥΟΥ ("Satrap Kharahostes, son of Arta"). Kharoahthi mint mark sam Reverse: Lion. Kharoshthi legend Chatrapasa pra Kharaustasa Artasa putrasa ("Satrap Kharahostes, son of Arta").

Kharahostes or Kharaosta (Greek: Χαραηώστης Kharahṓstēs, ΧΑΡΑΗωϹΤΕΙ Kharahōstei (epigraphic); Kharosthi: 𐨑𐨪𐨀𐨆𐨯𐨿𐨟 Kha-ra-o-sta, Kharaosta, 𐨑𐨪𐨩𐨆𐨯𐨿𐨟 Kha-ra-yo-sta, Kharayosta;) was an Indo-Scythian ruler (probably a satrap) in the northern Indian subcontinent around 10 BCE – 10 CE. He is known from his coins, often in the name of Azes II, and possibly from an inscription on the Mathura lion capital, although another satrap Kharaostes has been discovered in Mathura.

He was probably a successor of Azes II. Epigraphical evidence from inscribed reliquaries show for certain that he was already "Yabgu-King", when the Indravarman Silver Reliquary was dedicated, which is itself positioned with certainty before the 5-6 CE Bajaur casket. There is some dispute however about the exact meaning of Yabgu-King. For Richard Salomon, Yabgu means "tribal chief", in the manner of the Kushans, suggesting that Kharahostes was already fully king by the end of the 1st century BCE, supporting a 10 BCE- 10 CE date for his reign. For Joe Cribb, this is a misspelling by a careless scribe, and should be read "yuva-King" which means "Heir apparent", and therefore would push forward the years Kharahostes actually ruled to the first part of the 1st century CE.

Coin finds suggest that Kharahostes ruled in the area of the Darunta district to the west of Jalalabad, probably based on the ancient city of Nagarahara, located to the west of Jalalabad.

== Name ==
Kharahostes's name is recorded in the Greek form Kharahṓstēs (Χαραηώστης) and the Kharosthi forms Kharaosta (𐨑𐨪𐨀𐨆𐨯𐨿𐨟) and Kharayosta (𐨑𐨪𐨩𐨆𐨯𐨿𐨟), which are derived from the Saka name *Xārahōsta, meaning "splendid, mighty"

== Son of Arta ==
Kharahostes's own coins attest that he was the son of Arta, a brother of king Maues, and Satrap of Chukhsa.

According to F. W. Thomas and Hendrik Willem Obbink, his mother was Nada Diaka, who was the daughter of Ayasia Kamuia. However, according to Sten Konow, Ayasia Kamuia, the chief queen of Rajuvula, was the daughter of Kharahostes.

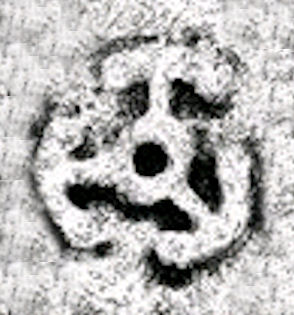
Dynastic mark of Kharahostes.

Kharohostes' coinage bears a dynastic mark (a circle within three pellets), which is rather similar, although not identical, with the dynastic mark of the Kushan ruler Kujula Kadphises (three pellets joined together), which has led to suggestions that they may have been contemporary rulers.

The Kharaosta of the Mathura lion capital inscriptions is usually identified with the Satrap Kharaostas or Kharahostes. However, according to a recent study by Joe Cribb, the Kharaostes of Mathura should be considered as a different Indo-Scythian Northern Satrap, who ruled in Mathura with his own specific coinage and was probably a successor of Sodasa just before the conquest of Mathura by Kushan king Vima Takto.

Kharaosta's known coins are of two types, presenting legends in Greek characters on the obverse and in Kharoshthi in the reverse: a round type in the name of Azes and three-pellet symbol, also recently attributed to his son Mujatria, and a square type without the three-pellet symbol in his own name, as son of Arta.

The Greek and Kharoshthi legends in the square coins run thus:

XAPAHWCTEI ϹΑΤΡΑΠΕΙ ARTAYOY (Greek for "Satrap Kharahostes, son of Arta")
Kṣatrapasa Pra Kharaoṣtasa Artasa Putrasa (Kharoshthi for "Satrap Kharaosta, son of Arta")

Some of his coins write "Ortas" in place of "Artas".

== Buddhist dedications ==
Kharahostes is known for several Buddhist dedications.

=== Bimaran casket ===
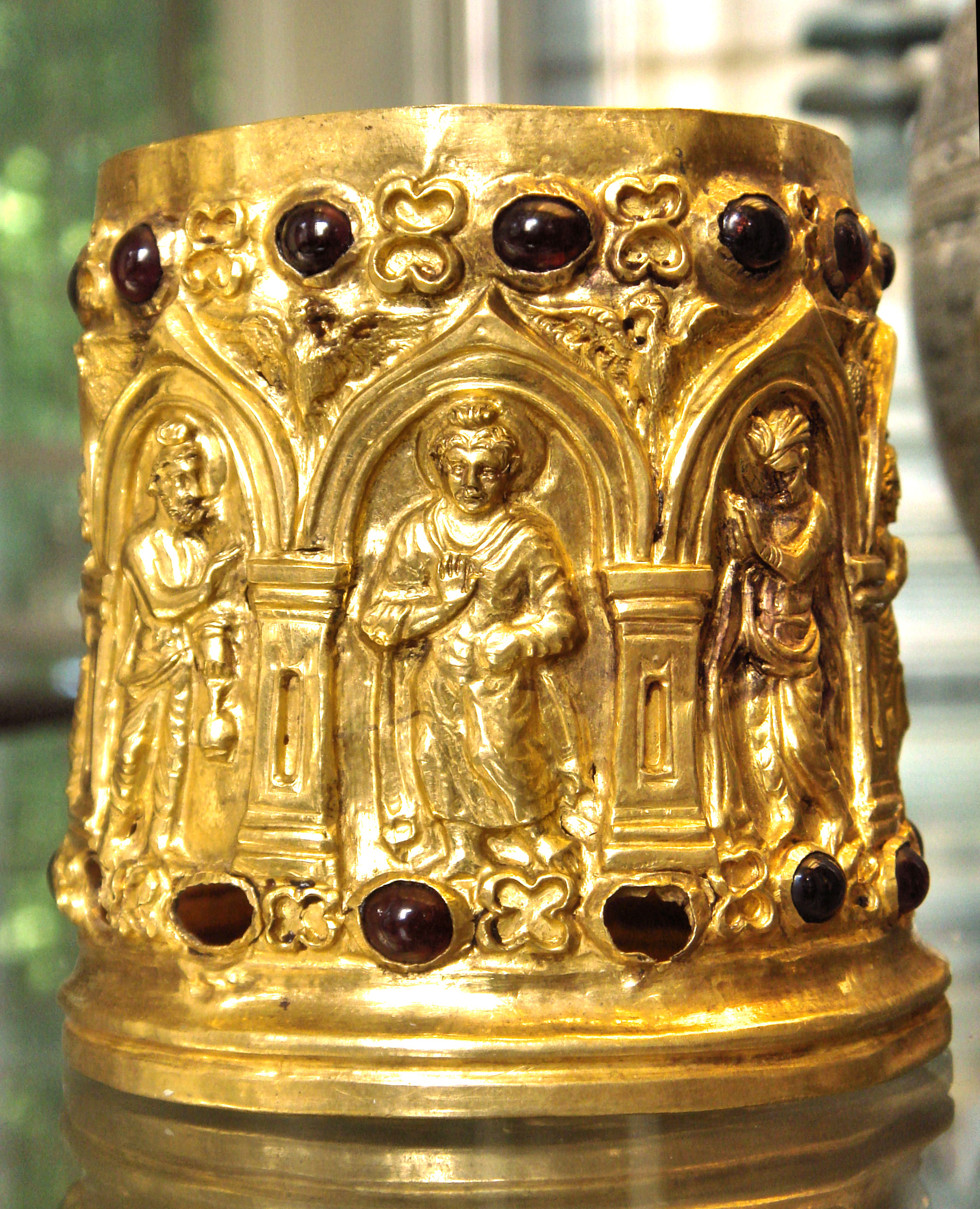
Unworn coins of Kharahostes were found in the Bimaran casket, suggesting the dedication was made during his rule.

Unworn coins of Kharahostes, or his son Mujatria, were found in the Bimaran casket, suggesting the dedication was made during his rule or that of his son, if not by them personally.

=== Indravarman's Silver Reliquary ===
Kharahostes is also known as one of the owners of the Indravarman's Silver Reliquary as described by the inscriptions in Kharoshthi on the reliquary. He was probably the initial owner of the reliquary, which was then rededicated by Apraca ruler Indravarma. The Indravarman Silver Reliquary is dated with certainty before the Bajaur casket, meaning it must have been dedicated by Indravarman as a Prince in the end of the 1st century BCE, implying that Kharahostes, the previous owner of the Silver Reliquary (as shown by the inscriptions) was already king before that time (at the very least before 6 CE, date of the Bajaur casket).

== A son: Mujatria ==
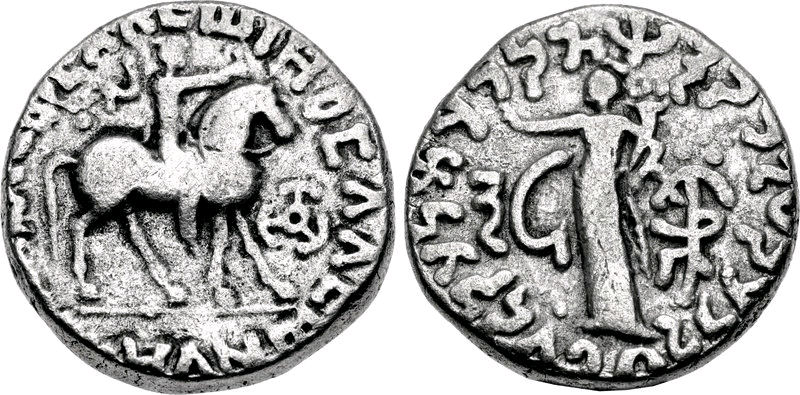
According to Joe Cribb (2015), this coin type may belong to Kharaostes's son Mujatria.

Some rare square coins, also displaying the three-pellet symbol, were struck in the name of Mujatria, who claims in the Kharoshthi legends of these coins that he is the "son of Kharahostes".

A recent study (2015) by Joe Cribb suggests that the round debased silver coins with three-pellet symbols in the name of Azes, usually attributed to Kharahostes, should actually be attributed to Mujatria.

== See also ==
- Parama-Kambojas
- India and Central Asia

== Sources ==
- Harmatta, János (1999). "Languages and scripts in Graeco-Bactria and the Saka Kingdoms". In Harmatta, János; Puri, B. N.; Etemadi, G. F. (eds.). History of civilizations of Central Asia. Vol. 2. Delhi: Motilal Banarsidass Publishing House. ISBN 978-8-120-81408-0.
- Konow, Sten (1929). Kharoshṭhī Inscriptions: with the Exception of Those of Aśoka. Kolkata: Government of India Central Publication Branch.

Territories/ dates	Western India	Western Pakistan Balochistan	Paropamisadae Arachosia	Bajaur	Gandhara	Western Punjab	Eastern Punjab	Mathura
			INDO-GREEK KINGDOM					
90–85 BCE			Nicias	Menander II		Artemidoros		
90–70 BCE			Hermaeus	Archebius				
85-60 BCE			INDO-SCYTHIAN KINGDOM; Maues					
75–70 BCE			Vonones; Spalahores	Telephos		Apollodotus II		
65–55 BCE			Spalirises; Spalagadames			Hippostratos	Dionysios	
55–35 BCE			Azes I				Zoilos II	
55–35 BCE			Azilises; Azes II				Apollophanes	Indo-Scythian dynasty of the NORTHERN SATRAPS; Hagamasha
25 BCE – 10 CE				Indo-Scythian dynasty of the APRACHARAJAS; Vijayamitra (ruled 12 BCE - 15 CE) (Note: From the dated inscription on the Rukhana reliquary)	Liaka Kusulaka; Patika Kusulaka; Zeionises	Kharahostes (ruled 10 BCE– 10 CE) (Note: An Inscribed Silver Buddhist Reliquary of the Time of King Kharaosta and Prince Indravarman, Richard Salomon, Journal of the American Oriental Society, Vol. 116, No. 3 (Jul. - Sep., 1996), pp. 442); Mujatria	Strato II and Strato III	Hagana
10-20 CE		INDO-PARTHIAN KINGDOM; Gondophares		Indravasu	INDO-PARTHIAN KINGDOM; Gondophares		Rajuvula	
20-30 CE			Ubouzanes; Pakores	Vispavarma (ruled c.0-20 CE) (Note: A Kharosthī Reliquary Inscription of the Time of the Apraca Prince Visnuvarma, by Richard Salomon, South Asian Studies 11 1995, Pages 27-32, Published online: 09 Aug 2010)	Sarpedones		Bhadayasa	Sodasa
30-40 CE			KUSHAN EMPIRE; Kujula Kadphises	Indravarma	Abdagases		...	...
40-45 CE				Aspavarma	Gadana		...	...
45-50 CE				Sasan	Sases		...	...
50-75 CE							...	...
75-100 CE	Indo-Scythian dynasty of the WESTERN SATRAPS; Chastana		Vima Takto				...	...
100-120 CE	Abhiraka		Vima Kadphises				...	...
120 CE	Bhumaka; Nahapana	PARATARAJAS; Yolamira	Kanishka I				Great Satrap Kharapallana and Satrap Vanaspara for Kanishka I	
130-230 CE	Jayadaman; Rudradaman I Damajadasri I Jivadaman; Rudrasimha I Satyadaman; Jivadaman; Rudrasena I	Bagamira; Arjuna; Hvaramira; Mirahvara	Vāsishka (c. 140 – c. 160); Huvishka (c. 160 – c. 190); Vasudeva I (c. 190 – to at least 230)					
230-280 CE	Samghadaman; Damasena; Damajadasri II; Viradaman; Isvaradatta; Yasodaman I Vijayasena; Damajadasri III; Rudrasena II; Visvasimha	Miratakhma; Kozana; Bhimarjuna; Koziya; Datarvharna; Datarvharna	INDO-SASANIANS; Ardashir I, Sassanid king and "Kushanshah" (c. 230 – 250); Peroz I, "Kushanshah" (c. 250 – 265); Hormizd I, "Kushanshah" (c. 265 – 295)			Kanishka II (c. 230 – 240); Vashishka (c. 240 – 250); Kanishka III (c. 250 – 275)		
280-300 CE	Bhratadarman	Datayola II	Hormizd II, "Kushanshah" (c. 295 – 300)			Vasudeva II (c. 275 – 310)		
300-320 CE	Visvasena; Rudrasimha II; Jivadaman		Peroz II, "Kushanshah" (c. 300 – 325)			Vasudeva III; Vasudeva IV; Vasudeva V Chhu (c. 310? – 325)		
320-388 CE	Yasodaman II; Rudradaman II; Rudrasena III; Simhasena; Rudrasena IV		Shapur II Sassanid king and "Kushanshah" (c. 325); Varhran I, Varhran II, Varhran III "Kushanshahs" (c. 325 – 350); Peroz III "Kushanshah" (c. 350 –360); HEPHTHALITE/ HUNAS invasions			Shaka I (c. 325 – 345); Kipunada (c. 345 – 375)		GUPTA EMPIRE; Chandragupta I Samudragupta
388-395 CE	Rudrasimha III		Chandragupta II					
