= Hagamasha =

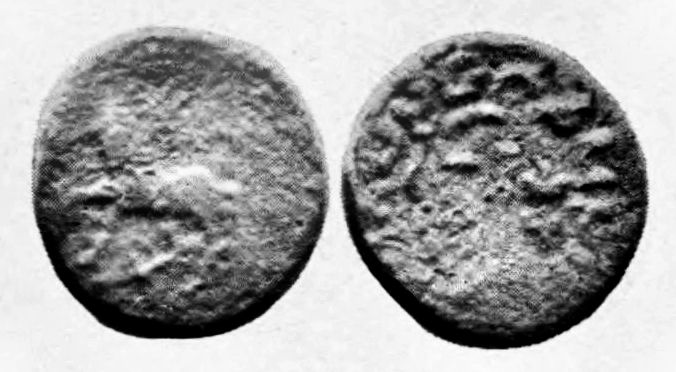
Coin of satrap Hagamasha. Obv. Horse to the left. Rev. Standing figure with symbols, legend Khatapasa Hagāmashasa. 1st century BCE.

Hagamasha (Ha-gā-ma-sa, Hagāmaṣa) was an Indo-Scythian Northern Satrap (ruled in Mathura in the 1st century BCE, probably after 60 BCE).

== Name ==
Hagamasha's name is attested on his coins in the Brahmi form Hagāmaṣa, which is derived from the Saka name *Frakāmaxša, meaning "whose chariot proceeds in front".

== Reign ==
In central India, the Indo-Scythians are thought to have conquered the area of Mathura over Indian kings around 60 BCE, thus founding the Northern Satraps. Some of their first satraps were Hagamasha and Hagana, who were in turn followed by Rajuvula, but according to some authors, Rajuvula may have been first.

In the archaeological excavations of Sonkh, near Mathura, the earliest coins of the Kshatrapa levels were those of Hagamasha.

Territories/ dates	Sindh	Western India	Western Pakistan Balochistan	Paropamisadae Arachosia	Bajaur	Gandhara	Western Punjab	Eastern Punjab	Mathura
450–90 BCE	Ror dynasty			INDO-GREEK KINGDOM					
90–85 BCE	Ror dynasty			Nicias	Menander II		Artemidoros		
90–70 BCE	Ror dynasty			Hermaeus	Archebius				
85-60 BCE	Ror dynasty			INDO-SCYTHIAN KINGDOM; Maues					
75–70 BCE	Ror dynasty			Vonones; Spalahores	Telephos		Apollodotus II		
65–55 BCE	Ror dynasty			Spalirises; Spalagadames			Hippostratos	Dionysios	
55–35 BCE	Ror dynasty			Azes I				Zoilos II	
55–35 BCE	Ror dynasty			Azilises; Azes II				Apollophanes	Indo-Scythian dynasty of the NORTHERN SATRAPS; Hagamasha
25 BCE – 10 CE	Ror dynasty				Indo-Scythian dynasty of the APRACHARAJAS; Vijayamitra (ruled 12 BCE - 15 CE) (Note: From the dated inscription on the Rukhana reliquary)	Liaka Kusulaka; Patika Kusulaka; Zeionises	Kharahostes (ruled 10 BCE– 10 CE) (Note: An Inscribed Silver Buddhist Reliquary of the Time of King Kharaosta and Prince Indravarman, Richard Salomon, Journal of the American Oriental Society, Vol. 116, No. 3 (Jul. - Sep., 1996), pp. 442); Mujatria	Strato II and Strato III	Hagana
10-20 CE	Ror dynasty		INDO-PARTHIAN KINGDOM; Gondophares		Indravasu	INDO-PARTHIAN KINGDOM; Gondophares		Rajuvula	
20-30 CE	Ror dynasty			Ubouzanes; Pakores	Vispavarma (ruled c.0-20 CE) (Note: A Kharosthī Reliquary Inscription of the Time of the Apraca Prince Visnuvarma, by Richard Salomon, South Asian Studies 11 1995, Pages 27-32, Published online: 09 Aug 2010)	Sarpedones		Bhadayasa	Sodasa
30-40 CE	Ror dynasty			KUSHAN EMPIRE; Kujula Kadphises	Indravarma	Abdagases		...	...
40-45 CE	Ror dynasty				Aspavarma	Gadana		...	...
45-50 CE	Ror dynasty				Sasan	Sases		...	...
50-75 CE	Ror dynasty							...	...
75-100 CE	Ror dynasty	Indo-Scythian dynasty of the WESTERN SATRAPS; Chastana		Vima Takto				...	...
100-120 CE	Ror dynasty	Abhiraka		Vima Kadphises				...	...
120 CE	Ror dynasty	Bhumaka; Nahapana	PARATARAJAS; Yolamira	Kanishka I				Great Satrap Kharapallana and Satrap Vanaspara for Kanishka I	
130-230 CE	Ror dynasty	Jayadaman; Rudradaman I Damajadasri I Jivadaman; Rudrasimha I Satyadaman; Jivadaman; Rudrasena I	Bagamira; Arjuna; Hvaramira; Mirahvara	Vāsishka (c. 140 – c. 160); Huvishka (c. 160 – c. 190); Vasudeva I (c. 190 – to at least 230)					
230-280 CE	Ror dynasty	Samghadaman; Damasena; Damajadasri II; Viradaman; Isvaradatta; Yasodaman I Vijayasena; Damajadasri III; Rudrasena II; Visvasimha	Miratakhma; Kozana; Bhimarjuna; Koziya; Datarvharna; Datarvharna	INDO-SASANIANS; Ardashir I, Sassanid king and "Kushanshah" (c. 230 – 250); Peroz I, "Kushanshah" (c. 250 – 265); Hormizd I, "Kushanshah" (c. 265 – 295)			Kanishka II (c. 230 – 240); Vashishka (c. 240 – 250); Kanishka III (c. 250 – 275)		
280-300 CE	Ror dynasty	Bhratadarman	Datayola II	Hormizd II, "Kushanshah" (c. 295 – 300)			Vasudeva II (c. 275 – 310)		
300-320 CE	Ror dynasty	Visvasena; Rudrasimha II; Jivadaman		Peroz II, "Kushanshah" (c. 300 – 325)			Vasudeva III; Vasudeva IV; Vasudeva V Chhu (c. 310? – 325)		
320-388 CE	Ror dynasty	Yasodaman II; Rudradaman II; Rudrasena III; Simhasena; Rudrasena IV		Shapur II Sassanid king and "Kushanshah" (c. 325); Varhran I, Varhran II, Varhran III "Kushanshahs" (c. 325 – 350); Peroz III "Kushanshah" (c. 350 –360); HEPHTHALITE/ HUNAS invasions			Shaka I (c. 325 – 345); Kipunada (c. 345 – 375)		GUPTA EMPIRE; Chandragupta I Samudragupta
388-395 CE	Ror dynasty	Rudrasimha III		Chandragupta II					
