= Rajuvula =

Indo-Scythian king who ruled the Mathura region in northern India (c. 10 CE)

- Indo-Scythian king
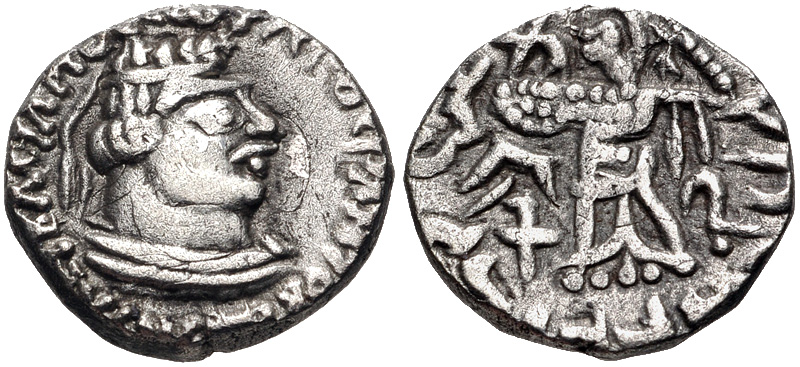
- Northern Satrap Rajuvula. Obv. Bust of king and Greek legend BASILEOS BASILEON SOTEROS RAZU, "Saviour King of Kings, Rajuvula". Rev. Athena Alkidemos and Kharoshthi legend Chatrapasa apratihatachakrasa rajuvulasa "the Satrap Rajuvula whose discus (cakra) is irresistible". These coins are found near Sankassa along the Ganges and in Eastern Punjab. Possibly minted in Sagala. The coins are derived from the Indo-Greek types of Strato II.
- Reign: c. 10-25 CE

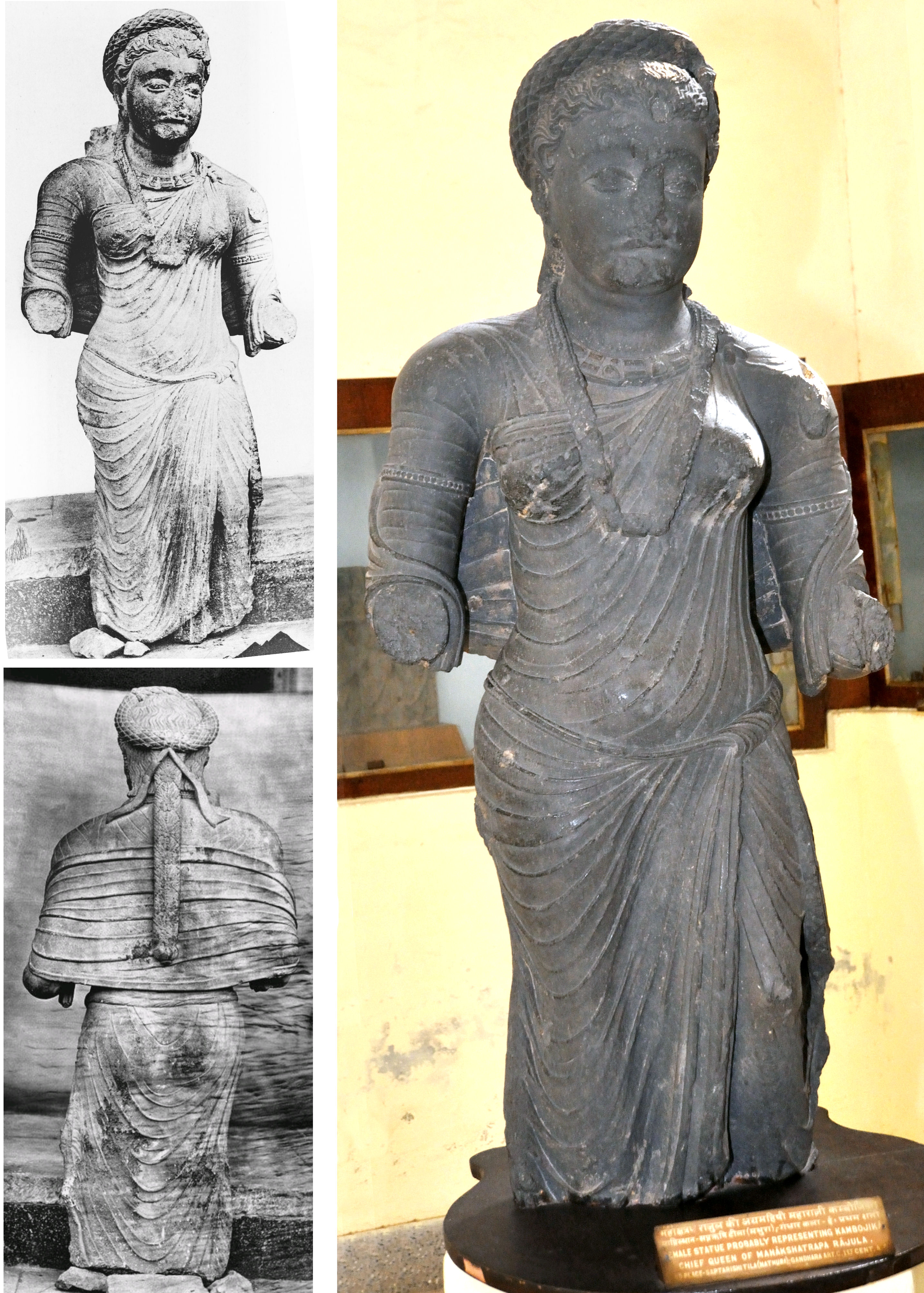
The Saptarishi Tila statue, possibly representing Kamuia Ayasa/ Kambojika, the Chief Queen of Mahakshatrapa Rajula. Found in the Saptarishi Mound, the same mound where the Mathura lion capital was found. c. 1st century CE.

Rajuvula (Greek ΡΑΖΥ Razy; Brahmi: Rā-ju-vu-la, Rājuvula; Kharosthi: 𐨪𐨗𐨂𐨬𐨂𐨫 Ra-ju-vu-la, Rajuvula; 𐨪𐨗𐨬𐨂𐨫 Ra-ja-vu-la, Rajavula; 𐨪𐨗𐨂𐨫 Ra-ju-la, Rajula) was an Indo-Scythian Great Satrap (Mahākṣatrapa), one of the "Northern Satraps" who ruled in the area of Mathura in the northern Indian subcontinent in the years around 10 CE. The Mathura lion capital was consecrated under the reign of Rajuvula. In central India, the Indo-Scythians had conquered the area of Mathura from Indian kings around 60 BCE. Some of their satraps were Hagamasha and Hagana, who were in turn followed by Rajuvula.

== Name ==
Rajuvula's name is attested on his coins in the Brahmi form Rājuvula and the Kharosthi forms Rajuvula (𐨪𐨗𐨂𐨬𐨂𐨫), Rajavula (𐨪𐨗𐨬𐨂𐨫), and Rajula (𐨪𐨗𐨂𐨫), which are derived from the Saka name *Rāzavara, meaning "ruling king"

== Biography ==
Rajuvula is thought to have invaded the last of the Indo-Greek territories in the eastern Punjab, and replaced the last of the Indo-Greek kings, Strato II and Strato III. The main coinage of Rajuvula imitated that of the Indo-Greek rulers he supplanted.

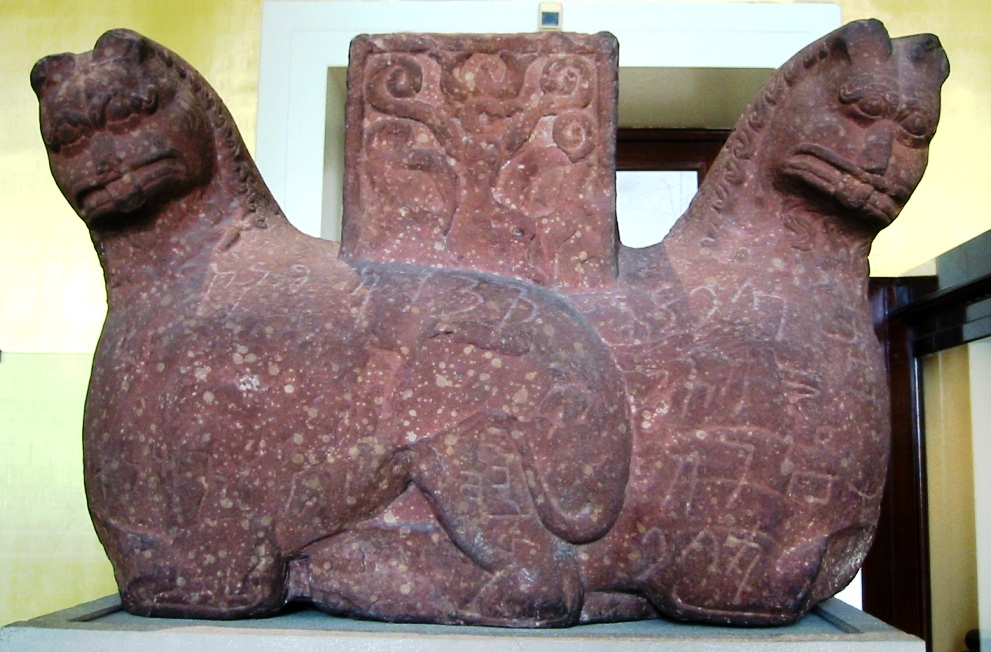
The Indo-Scythian Mathura lion capital, 1st century CE, mentioning Rajuvula and his wife, Nadasi Kasa (British Museum).

The Mathura lion capital, an Indo-Scythian sandstone capital from Mathura in Central India, and dated to the 1st century CE, describes in kharoshthi the gift of a stupa with a relic of the Buddha, by queen Nadasi Kasa, "the wife of Rajuvula" and "daughter of Aiyasi Kamuia", which was an older view supported by Bühler, Rapson, Lüders and others. But according to a later view propounded by Sten Konow, and accepted by later scholars, the principal donor making endowments was princess Aiyasi Kamuia, "chief queen of Rajuvula" and "daughter of Yuvaraja Kharaosta Kamuio". Nadasi Kasa (or Nada Diaka) was daughter of Ayasia Kamuia.

According to an older view, Yuvaraja Kharaosta Kamuio was thought to be the son of Ayasi Kamuia who in turn was thought to be the widow of Arta whom Rajuvula later married. Konow refuted this view, and concluded that Ayasia Kamuia, chief queen of Rajuvula, was the daughter and not the mother of Kharaosta Kamuio. The fact that the last name 'Kamuia' has been used both by Yuvaraja Kharaosta as well as the princess Aiyasi clearly proves that Aiyasi Kamuia was the daughter and not the mother of Yuvaraja Kharaosta Kamuio (Kambojaka), since such family-names or designations are naturally inherited from the father's side and not from the mother's. Hence, Dr Konow's interpretation appears more convincing.

The capital also mentions the genealogy of several Indo-Scythian satraps of Mathura.

The presence of the Buddhist symbol triratana at the center of the capital suggests that Rajuvula was, at least nominally, following the Buddhist faith.

Several other inscription from Mathura mention Rajuvula, such as the Mora Well Inscription.

Sodasa, son of Rajuvula, succeeded him and also made Mathura his capital.

== Coinage of Rajuvula ==
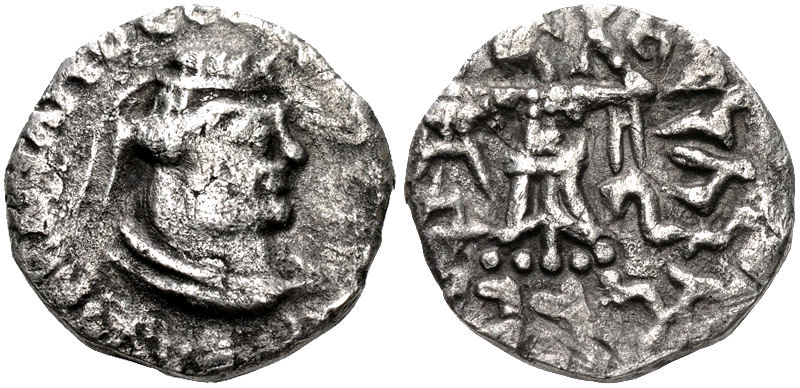
Coin of Rajuvula with Greek legend and Athena Alkidemos.

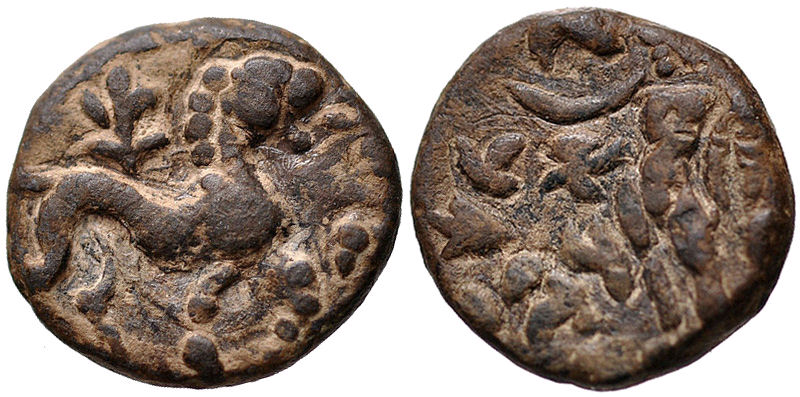
Coin of Rajuvula with lion and Herakles holding lion skin. Here the king's title is Mahakshatrapa' "Great Satrap". Coin probably minted in Taxila.

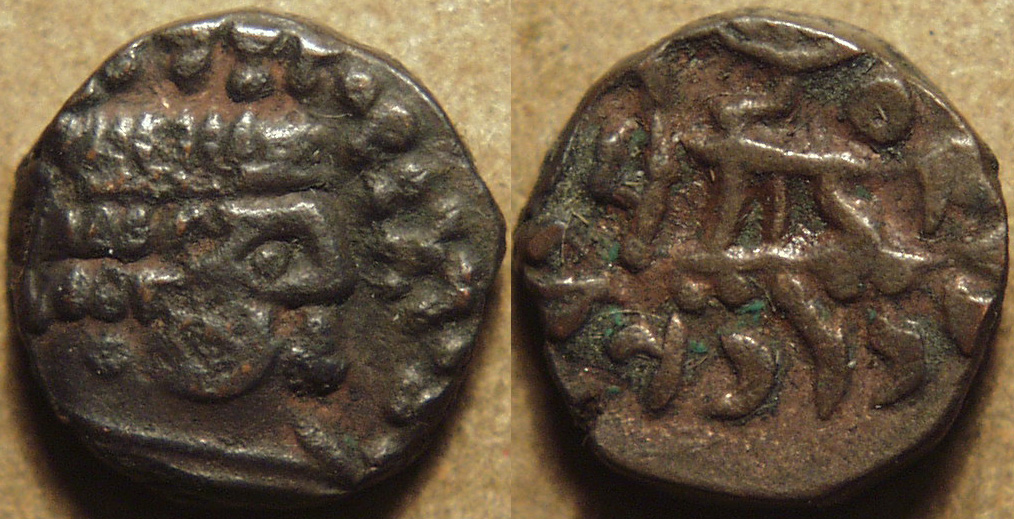
Billon drachm of the Indo-Scythian king Rajuvula (c. 10-25 CE). Weight: 2.21 gm, diameter: 12 mm

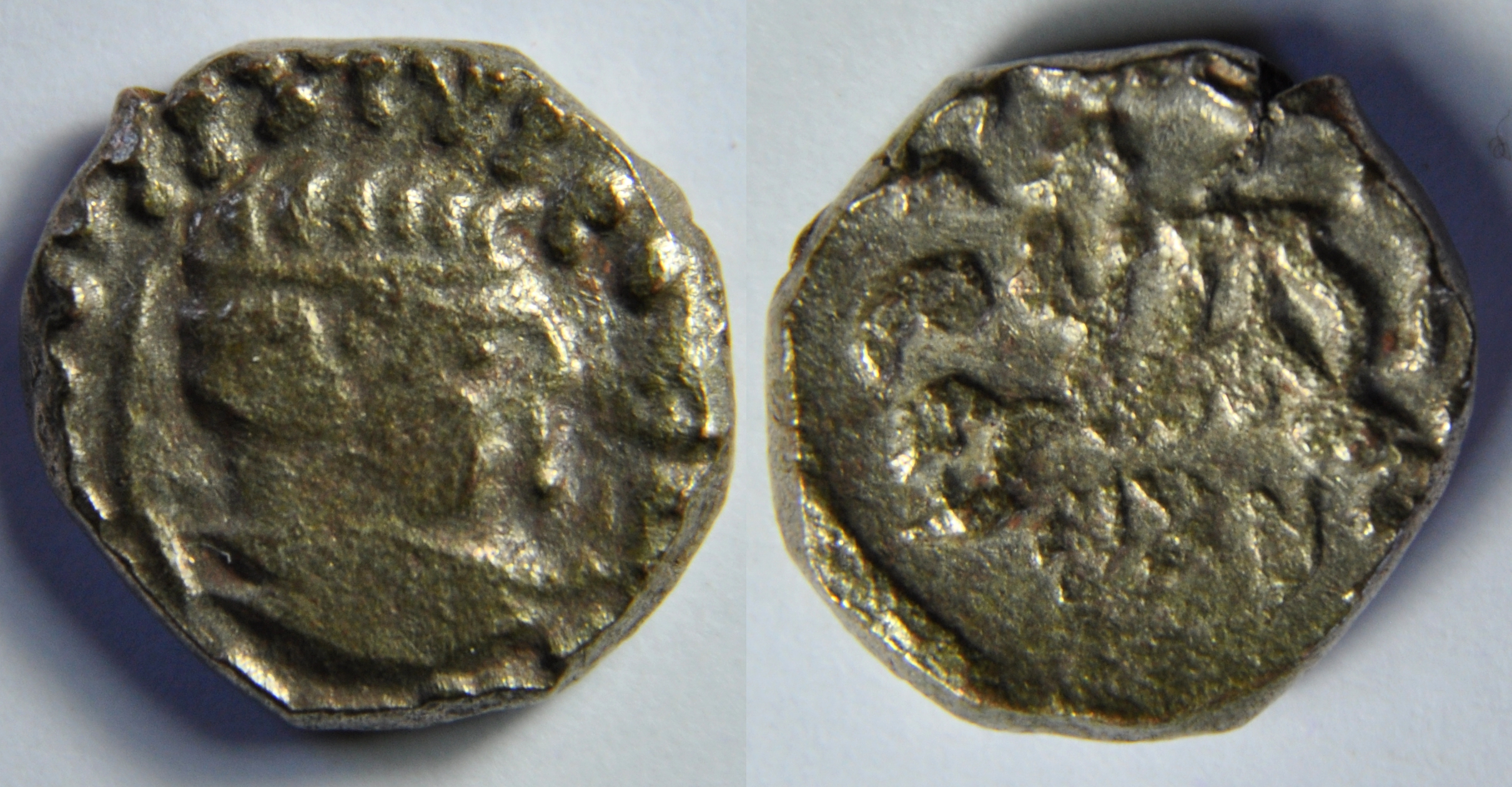
A coin of a silver drachma of the satrap Rujuvula who governs the Jammu in India from ca 10/1 BC to 1/10 AD for the Indo-Scythians. A / Diademed bust of the satrap to the right in stereotyped style. Greek inscription BASILEPS SPTROS around. R / Pallas left and inscription Chatrapasa apratihatachakrasa in Kharoshti around, control mark in the field. Dimension: 13 mm Weight: 2.42 g. Workshop of Jammu.

A coin bearing the face of Rajuvula

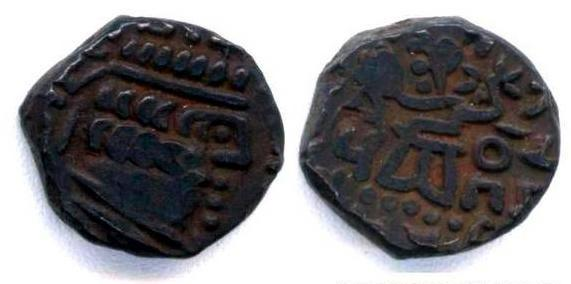
Two coins from the reign of Rajuvula

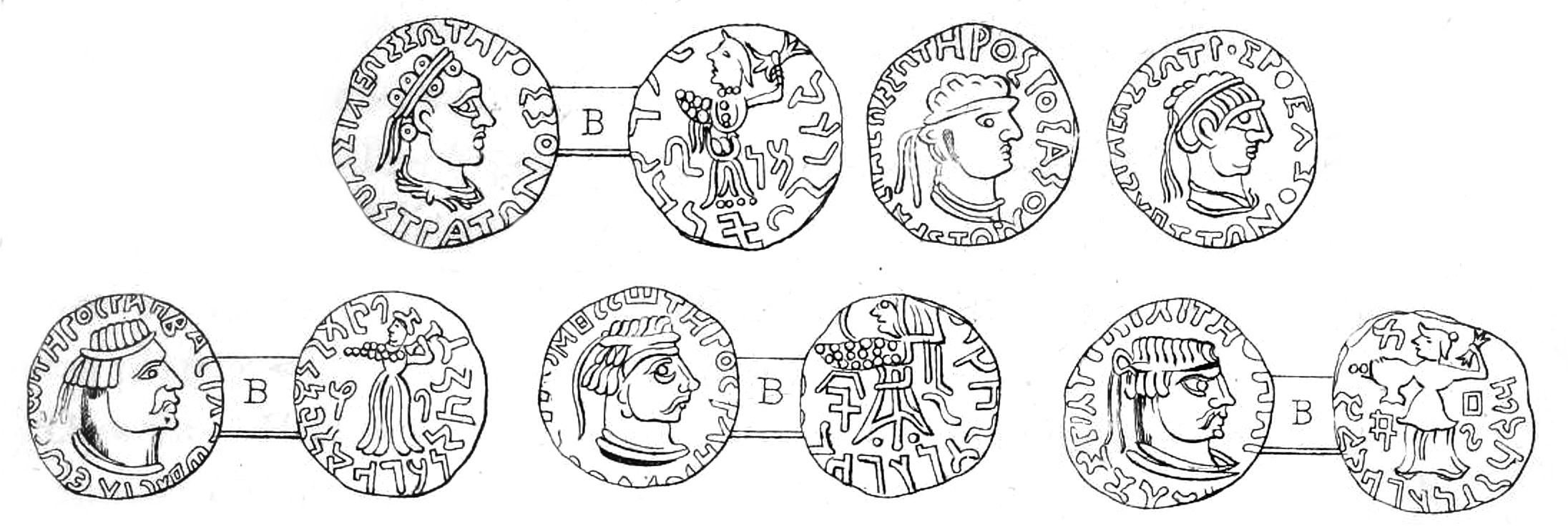
Coins of Strato (top) and Rajuvula (bottom) discovered together in a mound in Mathura.

== Notes ==
Territories/ dates	Western India	Western Pakistan Balochistan	Paropamisadae Arachosia	Bajaur	Gandhara	Western Punjab	Eastern Punjab	Mathura
			INDO-GREEK KINGDOM					
90–85 BCE			Nicias	Menander II		Artemidoros		
90–70 BCE			Hermaeus	Archebius				
85-60 BCE			INDO-SCYTHIAN KINGDOM; Maues					
75–70 BCE			Vonones; Spalahores	Telephos		Apollodotus II		
65–55 BCE			Spalirises; Spalagadames			Hippostratos	Dionysios	
55–35 BCE			Azes I				Zoilos II	
55–35 BCE			Azilises; Azes II				Apollophanes	Indo-Scythian dynasty of the NORTHERN SATRAPS; Hagamasha
25 BCE – 10 CE				Indo-Scythian dynasty of the APRACHARAJAS; Vijayamitra (ruled 12 BCE - 15 CE) (Note: From the dated inscription on the Rukhana reliquary)	Liaka Kusulaka; Patika Kusulaka; Zeionises	Kharahostes (ruled 10 BCE– 10 CE) (Note: An Inscribed Silver Buddhist Reliquary of the Time of King Kharaosta and Prince Indravarman, Richard Salomon, Journal of the American Oriental Society, Vol. 116, No. 3 (Jul. - Sep., 1996), pp. 442); Mujatria	Strato II and Strato III	Hagana
10-20 CE		INDO-PARTHIAN KINGDOM; Gondophares		Indravasu	INDO-PARTHIAN KINGDOM; Gondophares		Rajuvula	
20-30 CE			Ubouzanes; Pakores	Vispavarma (ruled c.0-20 CE) (Note: A Kharosthī Reliquary Inscription of the Time of the Apraca Prince Visnuvarma, by Richard Salomon, South Asian Studies 11 1995, Pages 27-32, Published online: 09 Aug 2010)	Sarpedones		Bhadayasa	Sodasa
30-40 CE			KUSHAN EMPIRE; Kujula Kadphises	Indravarma	Abdagases		...	...
40-45 CE				Aspavarma	Gadana		...	...
45-50 CE				Sasan	Sases		...	...
50-75 CE							...	...
75-100 CE	Indo-Scythian dynasty of the WESTERN SATRAPS; Chastana		Vima Takto				...	...
100-120 CE	Abhiraka		Vima Kadphises				...	...
120 CE	Bhumaka; Nahapana	PARATARAJAS; Yolamira	Kanishka I				Great Satrap Kharapallana and Satrap Vanaspara for Kanishka I	
130-230 CE	Jayadaman; Rudradaman I Damajadasri I Jivadaman; Rudrasimha I Satyadaman; Jivadaman; Rudrasena I	Bagamira; Arjuna; Hvaramira; Mirahvara	Vāsishka (c. 140 – c. 160); Huvishka (c. 160 – c. 190); Vasudeva I (c. 190 – to at least 230)					
230-280 CE	Samghadaman; Damasena; Damajadasri II; Viradaman; Isvaradatta; Yasodaman I Vijayasena; Damajadasri III; Rudrasena II; Visvasimha	Miratakhma; Kozana; Bhimarjuna; Koziya; Datarvharna; Datarvharna	INDO-SASANIANS; Ardashir I, Sassanid king and "Kushanshah" (c. 230 – 250); Peroz I, "Kushanshah" (c. 250 – 265); Hormizd I, "Kushanshah" (c. 265 – 295)			Kanishka II (c. 230 – 240); Vashishka (c. 240 – 250); Kanishka III (c. 250 – 275)		
280-300 CE	Bhratadarman	Datayola II	Hormizd II, "Kushanshah" (c. 295 – 300)			Vasudeva II (c. 275 – 310)		
300-320 CE	Visvasena; Rudrasimha II; Jivadaman		Peroz II, "Kushanshah" (c. 300 – 325)			Vasudeva III; Vasudeva IV; Vasudeva V Chhu (c. 310? – 325)		
320-388 CE	Yasodaman II; Rudradaman II; Rudrasena III; Simhasena; Rudrasena IV		Shapur II Sassanid king and "Kushanshah" (c. 325); Varhran I, Varhran II, Varhran III "Kushanshahs" (c. 325 – 350); Peroz III "Kushanshah" (c. 350 –360); HEPHTHALITE/ HUNAS invasions			Shaka I (c. 325 – 345); Kipunada (c. 345 – 375)		GUPTA EMPIRE; Chandragupta I Samudragupta
388-395 CE	Rudrasimha III		Chandragupta II					
