= Bhagwan Lal Indraji =

Indian archaeologist and scholar

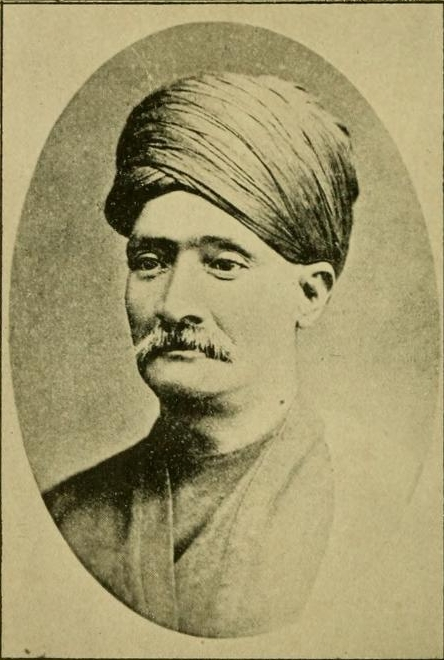
- Born: 8 November 1839; Junagadh, Junagadh State, Kathiawar Agency
- Died: 16 March 1888 (aged 48); Bombay, Bombay Presidency
- Other names: Bhagwanlal Indraji, Pandit Bhagvanlal Inderji
- Occupation: Archaeologist
- Known for: Deciphering ancient Indian inscriptions

Bhagwan Lal Indraji or Bhagwanlal Indraji (8 November 1839 – 16 March 1888) was an Indian archaeologist and scholar. A member of the Royal Asiatic Society's Bombay branch. He made transcripts of several ancient Indian inscriptions, including the Hathigumpha inscription. He discovered many archaeological relics, including the Mathura lion capital, the Bairat and Sopara Ashokan inscription, the Nanaghat reliefs, the Mathura Vishnu image, drum miniature stupa with a frieze of eight metopes representing the four principal and four secondary scenes from Buddha's life, Jain Aayagpata, various Mathura railing pillars, Mankuwar Buddha, Besnagar coping stone depicting Bodhi Tree, and Gadava surya frieze. He was the first Indian to receive an honorary doctorate from a foreign University (Leiden University).

== Early life ==
Bhagwan Lal Indraji was born in 1839 in Junagadh. He obtained his primary education in Junagadh, and learnt Sanskrit from his father, a Prashnora Nagar Brahmin.

== Initiation into archaeology ==
As a teenager, Bhagwan Lal frequented Girnar, which had several rocks with inscriptions in the Brahmi script. Colonel Lang, the Political Agent of Kathiawar took a lot of interest in these inscriptions. In 1854, he handed over a copy of James Prinsep's paper containing the Pali Brahmi alphabet to Manishankar Jatashankar, a local scholar. Jatashankar shared it with Bhagwan Lal, who made a copy of his own. Using this copy, Bhagwan Lal tried to decipher the Rudradaman I inscription on a Girnar rock. He could not understand the compound letters and the matras. So, he wrote to a friend in Bombay, requesting research material related to Girnar rock inscriptions. In response, he received several journals of the Royal Asiatic Society's Bombay branch. Using this material, he mastered the Pali alphabet, including its several varieties from different periods. He was able to make out unfamiliar letters and address omissions and inaccuracies in Prinsep's copy. He finally succeeded in making a completely new transcript of the Rudradaman inscription, which greatly impressed Colonel Lang. He mastered the Brahmi script. A.K. Forbes, who succeeded Lang as the Political Agent, introduced Bhagwan Lal to Bhau Daji, a renowned Bombay-based scholar of India antiquities.

== Archaeology career ==
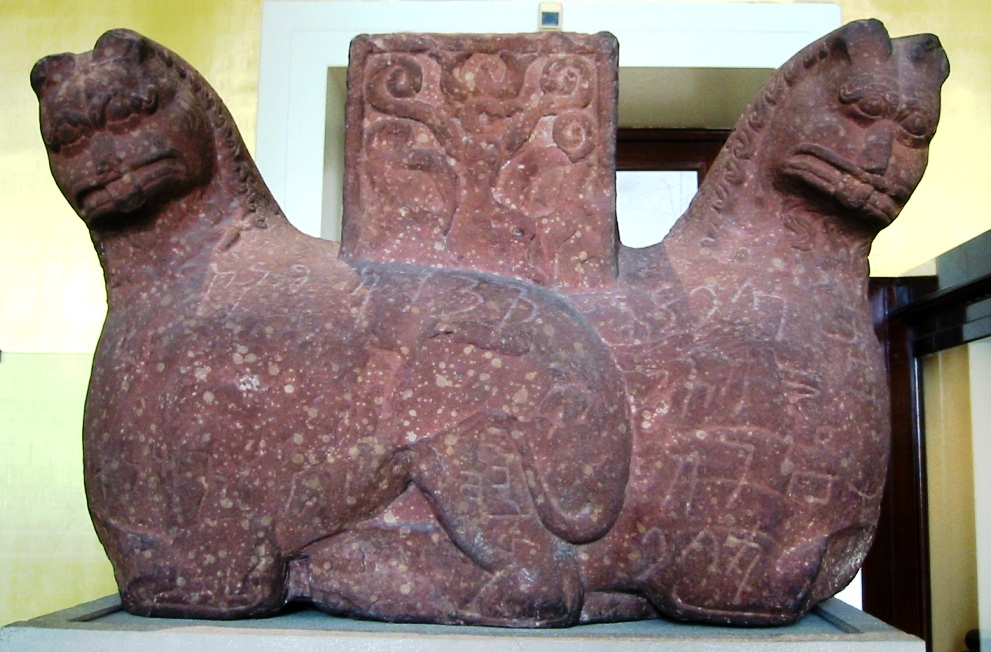
Mathura lion capital, excavated by Indraji in 1869

Bhau Daji commissioned Bhawanlal to prepare facsimiles and transcripts of Girnar inscriptions. In October 1861, Daji invited Bhagwan Lal to Bombay. There, he introduced him to H. Newton, the President of the Royal Asiatic Society's Bombay branch. Newton was writing a paper on Western Kshatrapas, and some Kshatrapa coins brought by Bhagwan Lal greatly interested him. Bhagwan Lal also presented his transcripts of Girnar's Rudradaman and Skandagupta inscriptions. At that time, Bhau Daji was doing research on the Sah inscription of Girnar. He found Horace Hayman Wilson's translation of the inscription to be inadequate, and requested Bahgwan Lal to make a new transcript. Accordingly, Bhagwan Lal set out to Kathiwar. There, he learnt of his father's death. After performing the funeral rites, he set out to Girnar, and prepared a new transcript of the Sah inscription. An impressed Daji later employed Bhagwan Lal permanently. On 24 April 1862, Bhagwan Lal moved to Bombay, where he initially lived in a tent in the compound of Daji's house.

In 1863, Bhau Daji sent Bhagwan Lal as a draftsman to Ajanta Caves. Bhagwan Lal returned to Bombay with the new transcripts. In Bombay, he spent time making transcripts of the inscriptions recovered from the caves at Nashik, Karli, Bhaja, Bhayandar, Junnar, Pitalkhora and Nanaghat. At Nanaghat, Bhagwan Lal discovered earliest reliefs of the early Satavahana rulers Satakarni, Queen Nayanika, Vedisiri and other princes.

On 22 December 1863, Bhagwan Lal set out on a tour of British India; his companions included Ardeshir Framji Moos and Cursetji Nusserwanji Cama among others. The group toured South India, North-Western Provinces, Bengal and North India.

In 1864, Bhau Daji sent Bhagwan Lal and Pandurang Gopal Padhye to Jaisalmer, to examine the ancient Jain manuscripts. The two men spent three months there, preparing copies of the literature preserved in the Jain manuscripts at a bhandar (store house). However, the damp atmosphere of the bhandar made them sick. Bhagwan Lal was down with typhoid for 22 days during his stay at Jaisalmer. The two returned to Bombay in May 1864.

In 1865, Bhagwan Lal set out on a year-long expedition to visit Banaras, Bodh Gaya, Barabar, Nagarjuni caves in Bihar, Hathigumpha caves, Dhauli, jaugada at Orissa and various ancient shrines, in order to personally examine the old inscriptions and architecture.

In 1868, Bhagwan Lal set out again on a year-long expedition to visit the ancient Hindu shrines, in order to examine the old inscriptions. He firstly visited Nagpur and Jabalpur, before spending five days in Allahabad. There, he made a transcript of a Samudragupta inscription, and sent it to Bhau Daji. This new transcript revealed new names of the king's contemporaries. Next, Bhagwan Lal visited Banaras, Bhitari, Mathura and Delhi. In Mathura, in 1869, he excavated the Mathura lion capital. He discovered 'Kambojika' (a Gandhara-style life-size statue). He purchased several Bactrian and Scythian coins from the local markets, until he ran out of money. He also discovered several other sculptures that including the famous Vishnu statue, which is now at National Museum (New Delhi) and a linga image (now lost). He extended his journey to Bodh Gaya before returning to Mumbai.

On 7 March 1871, Bhagwan Lal set out on another journey, financed by the Junagadh princely state. At the instance of Bhau Daji, Charles James Lyall, Under-Secretary to the Government of India, provided him a letter. The letter directed the Magistrates of Mathura, Agra, Benares, Farrukhabad, Gorakhpur, Ghazipur and Allahabd to help Bhagwan Lal in his pursuits. Accompanied by his wife Gangaben, Bhagwan Lal visited (in that order) Khandwa, Omkareshwar, Indore, Ujjain, Bhojpur, Dhar, Mandu, Bhilsa (Besnagar), Sanchi, Eran, Udayagiri, Benares, Sarnath, Allahabad, Bhitari, Delhi, Kalsi, Mathura, Agra and Gwalior. At Gwalior, his wife fell seriously ill, and he had to return to Bombay via Allahabad in March 1872.

After his wife recovered from illness, Bhagwan Lal again set out an expedition in December 1873. Once again, the princely state of Junagadh agreed to sponsor the journey. This time, Bhagwan Lal visited Nepal, Indo-Tibet border, Baluchistan and the Yusufzai territory. He also visited the Barabar and Nagarjunni Caves, Gaya, Bodh Gaya, Kashmir and Taxila.

Bhagwan Lal was a pioneer in Ashokan studies. He discovered the archaeological sites at Bairat and Sopara. He excavated Sopara and published an excavation report. He was the first Indian to excavate and publish the report. Most of the inscriptions in Archaeological Survey of Western India Reports volume 4 and 5 were his contributions. He was co-author (with James Burgess) of Inscriptions from the Caves Temples of Western India with descriptive notes. He was the main contributor to Burgess' Ajanta Notes and Rock-cut Temples at Badami in the Deccan.

Bhagwanlal contributed extensively to Thana, Poona, Nasik, volumes of The Gazetteer of the Bombay Presidency, where he contributed on Eksar Memorial stones, Elephanta. Jogeshwari Kondivti, Lonad Pulu Sonala caves, on Shahur-Atgaon sculptures, Junnar and nanaghat Caves, Nasik caves. He contributed socio-religious study on Pandharpur in Sholapur Gazetteer.

He also arranged a genealogy of the Kashtriya rulers of India, on the basis of coins. In addition, he prepared detailed records of language, costumes, lifestyle, religion and culture in various regions of India. He gifted all his notes, inscriptions, coins, manuscripts and other research material to the Royal Asiatic Society, the British Museum and the Bombay Native General Library.

Bhagwan Lal did not know English, which greatly impeded his research and reach of his contributions. He died on 16 March 1888, after a prolonged illness.

== Awards and honours ==
Honours accorded to Bhagwan Lal include:

- Honorary membership of the Royal Asiatic Society, 1877
- Fellow of Bombay University, 1882
- Honorary Fellow of the Royal Institute of Philology, Geography and Ethnology of the Netherlands Hague, 1883
- Honorary Doctorate from Leiden University 1884
- Fellow of the Royal Asiatic Society of Great Britain
