= Mathura lion capital =

Indo-Scythian sandstone capital from northern India

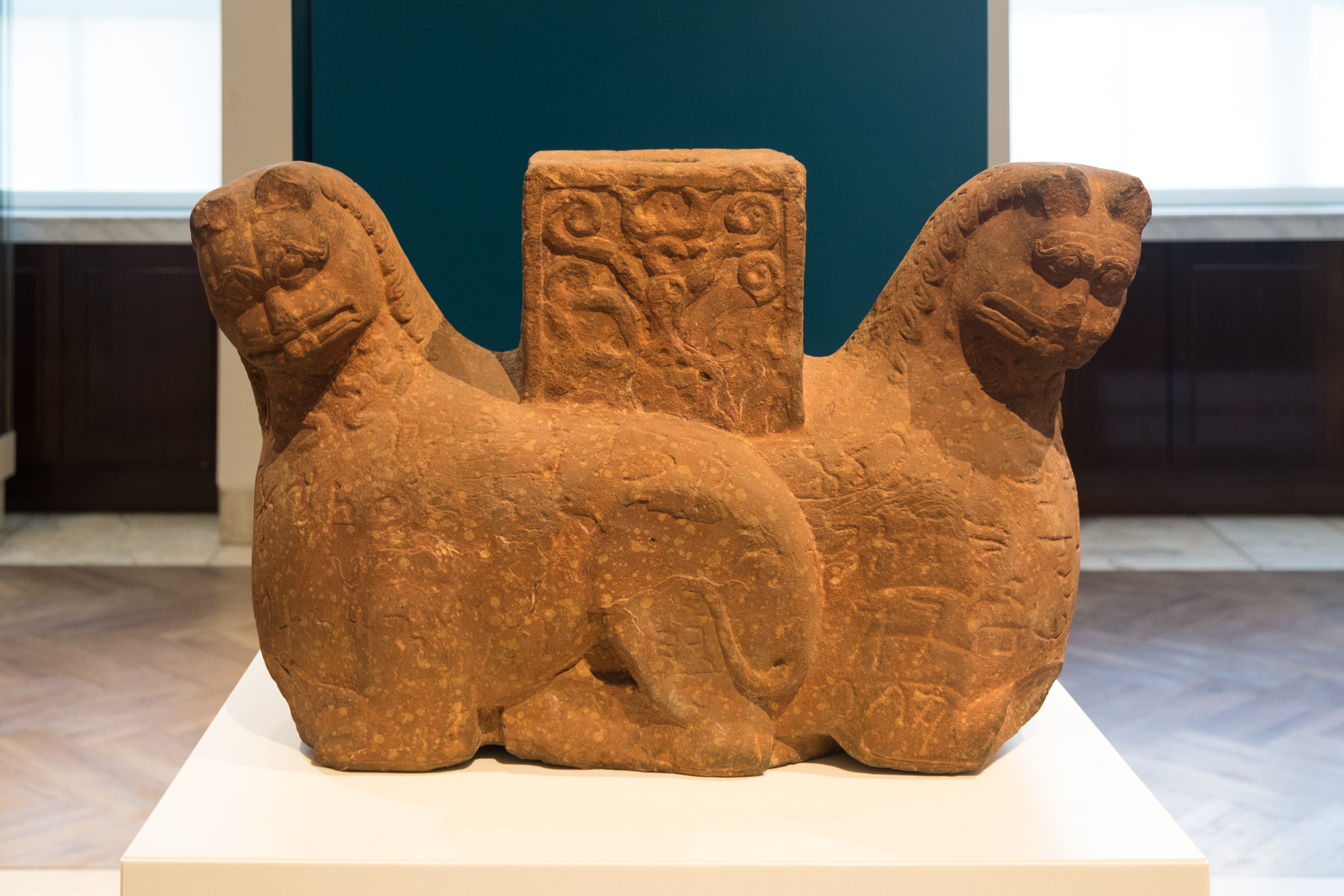
- The Mathura lion capital on display in the Sir Joseph Hotung Gallery for China and South Asia, at the British Museum.
- Material: Red Sandstone
- Size: Height 34cm Width 52.5cm
- Writing: Prakrit inscription written in Kharoshthi script
- Created: 1–10 CE
- Discovered: Mathura in Central India
- Present location: British Museum, London

Location

The Mathura lion capital is an Indo-Scythian sandstone capital (a part of a pillar) from Mathura in Northern India, dated to the first decade of the 1st century CE (1–10 CE). It was consecrated under the rule of Rajuvula, one of the Northern Satraps of the region of Mathura.

The capital was unearthed at the Saptarishi mound of Mathura by Bhagwan Lal Indraji in 1869. It is covered with Prakrit inscriptions in the kharoshthi script of northwestern India. The capital was made on the occasion of the funeral of "the illustrious king Muki and his horse" (Muki has been conjectured to be Maues).

The capital describes, among other donations, the gift of a stupa with a relic of the Buddha, by Queen Ayasia, the "chief queen of the Indo-Scythian ruler of Mathura, satrap Rajuvula". The Mathura lion capital, an Indo-Scythian sandstone capital from Mathura in Central India, and dated to the 1st century CE, describes in kharoshthi the gift of a stupa with a relic of the Buddha, by queen Nadasi Kasa, "the wife of Rajuvula" and "daughter of Aiyasi Kamuia", who is mentioned as the "daughter of Kharahostes". The lion capital also mentions the genealogy of several Indo-Scythian satraps of Mathura. It mentions Sodasa, son of Rajuvula, who succeeded him and also made Mathura his capital.

The capital also displays at its center a Buddhist triratana symbol, further confirming the involvement of Indo-Scythian rulers with Buddhism.

The inscription indicates support of the Sarvastivadin, against the Mahasamghikas.

It is on display in the South Asia section of the Sir Joseph Hotung Gallery for China and South Asia at the British Museum.

== List of inscriptions ==
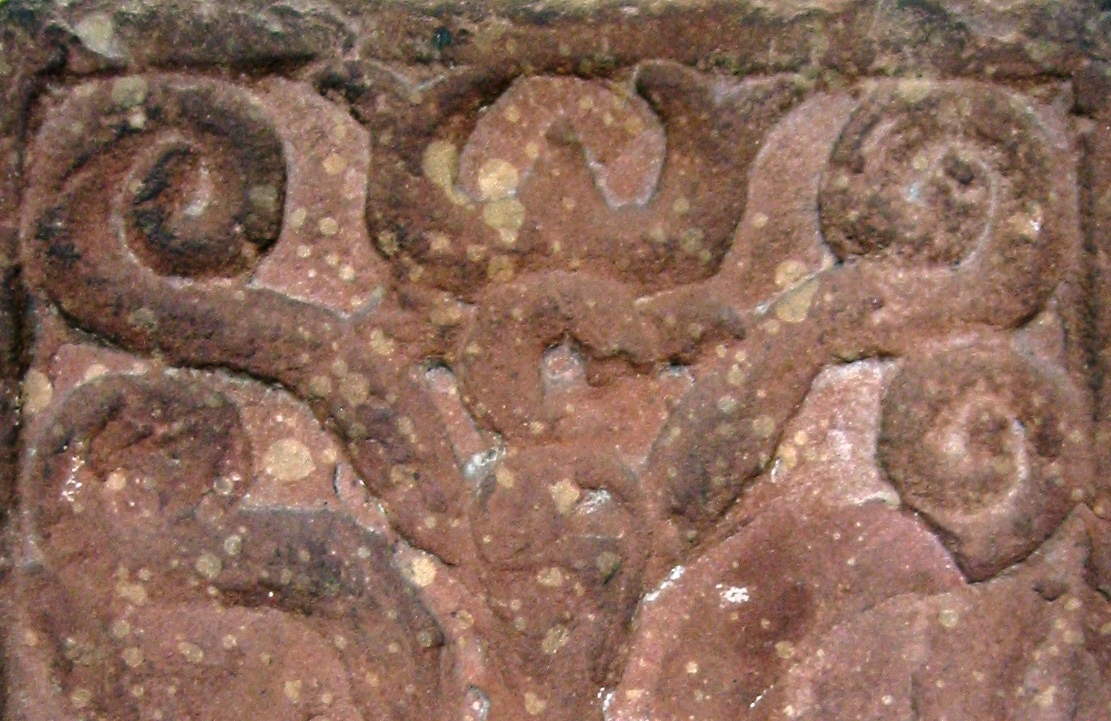
Buddhist symbol of the triratana at the center of the capital, supported by a convoluted tree, possibly a variation of the anthemion design.

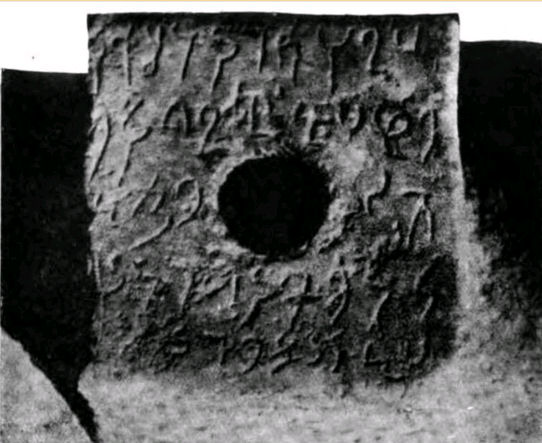
Kharoshthi inscription on base of Mathura capital.

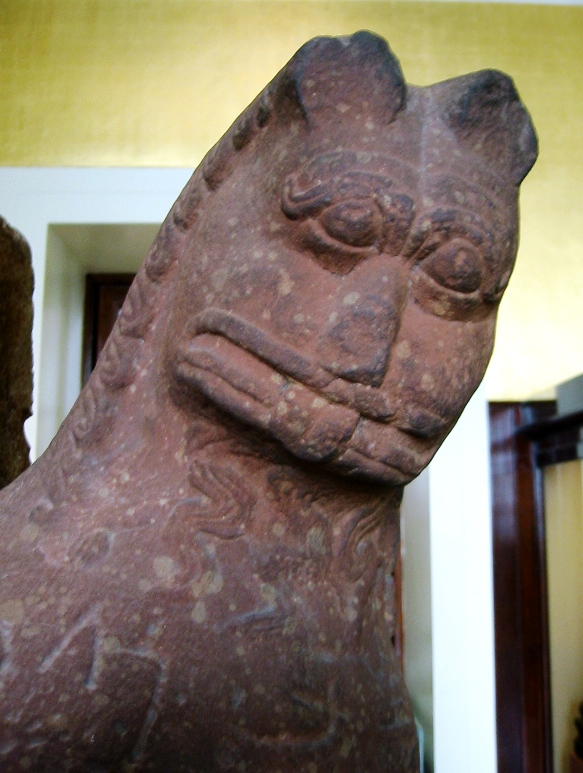
Lion detail on the Mathura lion capital. British Museum.

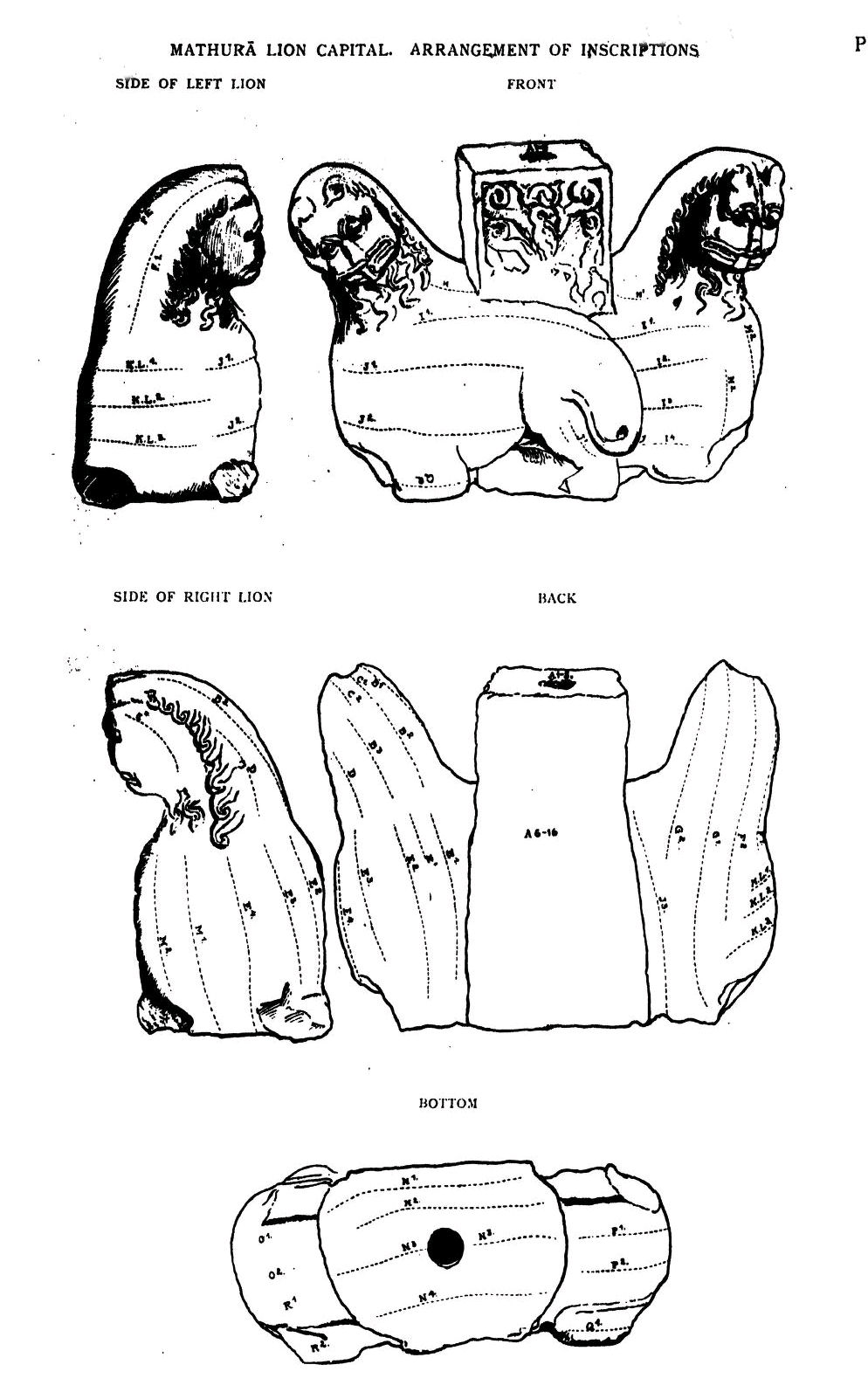
Layout of the Mathura lion capital inscriptions.

In a Latin transliteration of simplified Kharosthi script, the inscriptions read:

Inscription of the Mathura Lion Capital
Inscription	Original (Kharosthi script)	Transliteration	English translation
A1	𐨨𐨱𐨐𐨿𐨮𐨟𐨿𐨪𐨆𐨬𐨯 𐨪𐨗𐨂𐨫𐨯	mahakṣatrovasa Rajulasa	Of the Great Satrap Rajuvula
A2	𐨀𐨒𐨿𐨪𐨨𐨱𐨅𐨮𐨁 𐨀𐨩𐨯𐨁𐨀	agramaheṣi Ayasia	By the main Queen Ayasi
A3	𐨐𐨨𐨂𐨁𐨀 𐨢𐨁𐨟𐨿𐨪	Kamuia dhitra	Kamuia, daughter
A4	𐨑𐨪𐨀𐨆𐨯𐨿𐨟𐨯 𐨩𐨂𐨬𐨪𐨙	Kharaostasa yuvaraña	of the young king Kharahostes
A5	𐨨𐨟𐨿𐨪 𐨣𐨡𐨡𐨁𐨀𐨐𐨯 𐨩	matra Nada-Diakasa ya	and mother of Nadadiaka,
A6	𐨯𐨢 𐨨𐨟𐨿𐨪 𐨀𐨦𐨂𐨱𐨆𐨫𐨀	sadha matra Abuholaa	together with (her) mother, Abuhola,
A7	𐨤𐨁𐨟𐨿𐨪𐨨𐨱𐨁 𐨤𐨁𐨭𐨿𐨤𐨯𐨿𐨪𐨁𐨀 𐨧𐨿𐨪	pitramahi Piśpasria bhra	(her) father's mother, Piśpasi, and (her) brother
A8	𐨟𐨿𐨪 𐨱𐨩𐨂𐨀𐨪𐨅𐨣 𐨯𐨢 𐨱𐨣𐨕𐨣	tra Hayuarena sadha hanacana	Hayuara (and) together with the hanacana-
A9	𐨀𐨙𐨀𐨂𐨪𐨅𐨣 𐨱𐨆𐨪𐨐𐨤	añaürena horakapa	añaüra donors'
A10	𐨪𐨁𐨬𐨪𐨅𐨣 𐨀𐨁𐨭 𐨤𐨿𐨪𐨢𐨬𐨁𐨤𐨿𐨪𐨟𐨅	rivarena iśa pradhaviprate	retinue, in this place of the earth,
A11	𐨭𐨅 𐨣𐨁𐨯𐨁𐨨𐨅 𐨭𐨪𐨁𐨪 𐨤𐨿𐨪𐨟𐨅𐨛𐨬𐨁𐨟𐨆	śe nisime śarira prateṭhavito	outside the monastery boundary, a relic is established
A12	𐨧𐨐𐨩𐨟𐨆 𐨭𐨐𐨨𐨂𐨞𐨁𐨯 𐨦𐨂𐨢𐨯	bhakavato Śakamuṇisa Budhasa	of the Lord, the Śākya sage, Buddha,
A13	𐨭𐨐𐨁𐨨𐨂𐨪𐨩𐨯 𐨭𐨿𐨤𐨀𐨅 𐨧𐨂𐨯𐨬𐨁𐨱	Śakimurayasa śpae Bhusaviha	king of the Śākya in his own Busa
A14	𐨪 𐨠𐨂𐨬 𐨕 𐨯𐨓𐨪𐨨 𐨯𐨓𐨪𐨨 𐨕 𐨕𐨟𐨂	ra thuva ca sagharama ca catu	monastery, and also a stūpa, and quarters for the community, and the community of the four
A15	𐨡𐨁𐨭𐨯 𐨯𐨓𐨯 𐨯𐨪𐨿𐨬	diśasa saghasa sarva	directions, the sangha of the
A16	𐨯𐨿𐨟𐨁𐨬𐨟𐨣 𐨤𐨪𐨁𐨒𐨿𐨪𐨱𐨅	stivatana parigrahe	Sarvāstivādas possesses it.
B1	𐨨𐨱𐨐𐨿𐨮𐨟𐨿𐨪𐨬𐨯	mahakṣatravasa	The Great Satrap
B2	𐨬𐨗𐨂𐨫𐨤𐨂𐨟𐨿𐨪𐨯	vajulaputrasa	Rajuvula's son,
B3	𐨭𐨂𐨜𐨯 𐨐𐨿𐨮𐨟𐨿𐨪𐨬𐨅	Śuḍasa kṣatrave	the Satrap Śuḍasa,
E4′′	𐨐 𐨐𐨪𐨁𐨟	ka karita	makes
E1'	𐨑𐨪𐨀𐨆𐨯𐨿𐨟𐨆	Kharaosto	Kharahostes
E′	𐨐𐨨𐨂𐨁𐨀𐨆 𐨩𐨂𐨬𐨪𐨩	Kamuio yuvaraya	Kamuia, the young king,
E2	𐨑𐨫𐨨𐨯 𐨐𐨂𐨨𐨪	Khalamasa kumara	Prince Khalama,
E3	𐨨𐨗 𐨐𐨣𐨁𐨛	Maja kaniṭha	and Maja the youngest,
E4	𐨯𐨨𐨣𐨂𐨨𐨆𐨡	samanumoda	applaudants.
M1	𐨐𐨿𐨮𐨟𐨿𐨪𐨬𐨅 𐨭𐨂𐨜𐨁𐨯𐨅	kṣatrave Śuḍise	The Satrap Śuḍasa
J2	𐨣𐨁𐨯𐨁𐨨𐨆 𐨐𐨪𐨁𐨟 𐨣𐨁𐨩𐨟𐨁𐨟𐨆	nisimo karita niyatito	outside the monastic boundary; he offers
M2	𐨀𐨁𐨨𐨆 𐨤𐨢𐨬𐨁	imo padhavi	of the earth
M3	𐨤𐨿𐨪𐨟𐨅𐨭𐨆	prateśo	this region,
I2	𐨣𐨨𐨆 𐨐𐨢	namo kadha	called
I3	𐨬𐨪𐨆	varo	the encampment
I1a	𐨬𐨅𐨩𐨀𐨡𐨁𐨪𐨿𐨞	Veyaadirṇa	Veyaadirṇa
I4	𐨬𐨁𐨩𐨀	Viyaa	(and) the Viyaa
I1b	𐨐𐨢𐨬𐨪𐨐𐨆 𐨦𐨂𐨯𐨤	kadhavare Busapa	encampment, from the Busa
J1	𐨪𐨿𐨬𐨟𐨐𐨅𐨣 𐨤𐨫𐨁𐨖𐨁𐨣	rvatakena palichina	Mountain separated.
KL3	𐨀𐨂𐨟𐨀𐨅𐨣 𐨀𐨩𐨨𐨁𐨟	utaena ayamita	It is accepted by the water
KL1	𐨀𐨩𐨪𐨁𐨀𐨯	ayariasa	by the teacher
KL2	𐨦𐨂𐨢𐨟𐨅𐨬𐨯	Budhatevasa	Budhateva.
F1	𐨦𐨂𐨢𐨁𐨫𐨯 𐨣𐨐𐨪𐨀𐨯	Budhilasa nakaraasa	By Budhila, a city-dweller
F2	𐨧𐨁𐨑𐨯 𐨯𐨪𐨿𐨩𐨅𐨯𐨿𐨟𐨁𐨬𐨟𐨯	bhikhasa Sarvestivatasa	(and) Sarvāstivāda monk,
G1	𐨨𐨱𐨐𐨿𐨮𐨟𐨿𐨪𐨬𐨯 𐨐𐨂𐨯𐨂𐨫𐨀𐨯 𐨤𐨟𐨁𐨐𐨯 𐨨𐨅𐨬𐨐𐨁𐨯	mahakṣatravasa Kusulaasa Patikasa Mevakisa	in honour of the Great Satrap Patika Kusulaka, and of Mevaki
G2	𐨨𐨁𐨩𐨁𐨐𐨯 𐨐𐨿𐨮𐨟𐨿𐨪𐨬𐨯 𐨤𐨂𐨩𐨀𐨅	Miyikasa kṣatravasa puyae	Miyika, the satrap,
J3	𐨯𐨪𐨿𐨬𐨯𐨿𐨟𐨁𐨬𐨟𐨣 𐨤𐨪𐨁𐨒𐨿𐨪𐨱	Sarvastivatana parigraha	in the possession of the Sarvāstivādas.
N1	𐨀𐨩𐨪𐨁𐨀𐨯 𐨦𐨂𐨢𐨁𐨫𐨯 𐨣𐨐𐨪𐨐𐨯 𐨧𐨁𐨑𐨂	ayariasa Budhilasa nakarakasa bhikhu	The teacher Budhila, city-dweller and monk
N2	𐨯 𐨯𐨪𐨿𐨬𐨯𐨿𐨟𐨁𐨬𐨟𐨯 𐨤𐨪𐨁𐨒𐨿𐨪	sa Sarvastivatasa parigra	of the Sarvāstivāda community, his act of possession
N3	𐨣 𐨨𐨱𐨯𐨓𐨁𐨀𐨣 𐨤𐨿𐨪	na Mahasaghiana pra	to the Mahāsāṃghikas
N4a	𐨙𐨬𐨁𐨟𐨬𐨅	ñavitave	must be announced.
P1	𐨯𐨪𐨿𐨬𐨯 𐨯𐨐𐨯𐨿𐨟	sarvasa Sakasta	In the whole of
P2	𐨣𐨯 𐨤𐨂𐨩𐨀𐨅	nasa puyae	Sakastan's honour,
O1	𐨯𐨪𐨿𐨬𐨦𐨂𐨢𐨣 𐨤𐨂𐨩 𐨢𐨨𐨯	sarvabudhana puya dhamasa	may all the Buddhas be honoured, may the Dharma
O2	𐨤𐨂𐨩 𐨯𐨓𐨯 𐨤𐨂𐨩	puya saghasa puya	be honoured, may the Sangha be honoured.
R1	𐨟𐨐𐨿𐨮𐨁𐨫𐨯	Takṣilasa	Of Taxila.
R2	𐨐𐨿𐨪𐨆𐨣𐨁𐨣𐨯	Kroninasa	Of Kronina.
N4b	𐨑𐨫𐨆𐨫𐨯	Khalolasa	Of Khalola.
Q1	𐨑𐨪𐨿𐨡𐨀𐨯	Khardaasa	Khardaa,
Q2	𐨐𐨿𐨮𐨟𐨿𐨪𐨬𐨯	kṣatravasa	the Satrap.
J′1	𐨑𐨫𐨭𐨨𐨂	Khalaśamu	Khalaśamuśa
J′2	𐨭𐨆	śo	
C1	𐨐𐨫𐨂𐨁𐨀	Kaluia	Kaluia,
C2	𐨬𐨪𐨗𐨆	Varajo	Varaja,
C3	𐨐𐨨𐨂𐨐	Kamuka	Kamuka,
D	𐨣𐨀𐨂𐨫𐨂𐨡𐨆	Nauludo	Naaluda.
H′	𐨢𐨨𐨡𐨣	dhamadana	Dharma gift,
H	𐨒𐨂𐨬𐨁𐨱𐨪	guhavihara	in the cave monastery.

== Interpretation ==
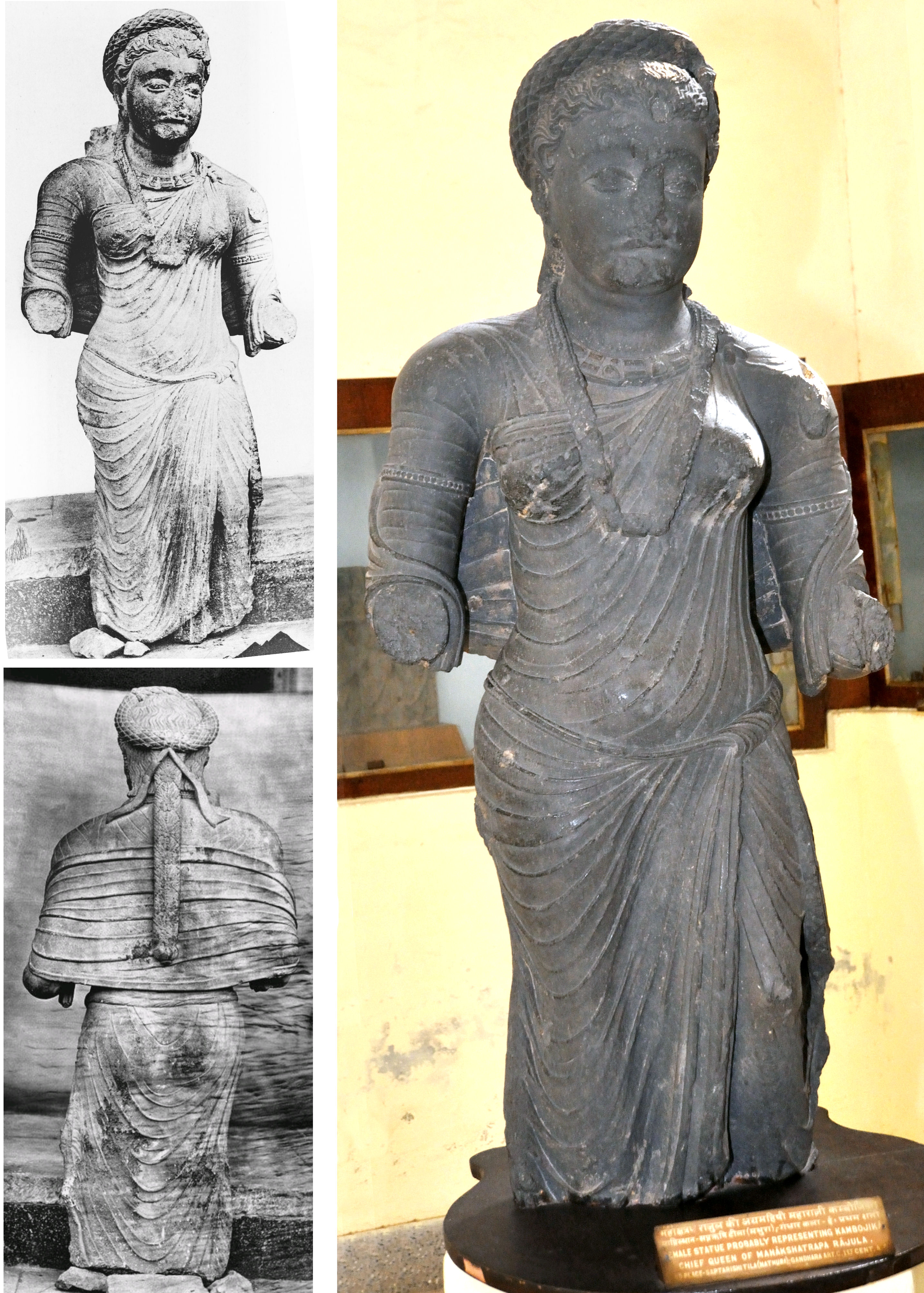
The Saptarishi Tila statue, possibly representing Kambojika, the Chief Queen of Mahakshatrapa Rajula. Found in the Saptarishi Mound, the same mound where the Mathura lion capital was found. c. 1st century CE. Other angles.

Sten Konow, who compiled a definitive listing of Indian Buddhist inscriptions said: "If we bear in mind that mb becomes m i.e mm in the dialect of Kharoshthi dhammapada, and that is used for the common o in Sudasa in the Lion Capital Inscriptions, the Kamuia of the Lion Capital can very well represent a Sanskrit Kambojika ... I shall only add that if Kharoshtha and his father Arta were Kambojas, the same may have been the case with Moga, and we understand why the Kambojas are sometimes mentioned with the Sakas and Yavanas". Many of Konow's readings, his sequence of sentences and some of the interpretation, particularly the connection with king Maues, need to be changed in the light of a new reading of H. Falk.

Queen Aiyasi is mentioned in the Mathura Lion capital, where she is described as belonging to the Kamuia clan (as rendered in Kharosthi script). The inscription itself does not provide further clarification regarding the ethnic or regional identity of this group.

The Hungarian-British archaeologist Aurel Stein proposed that Kamuia may represent a Gandhari-Prakrit form of Kamboja, an ancient Indo-Iranian people attested in early Sanskrit and classical sources. Stein’s suggestion was based on phonetic considerations and the historical presence of Kamboja groups in northwestern regions associated with Indo-Scythian political activity.

Subsequent scholarship has noted this Identification with caution. The phonological correspondence between Kamuia and Kamboja is not conclusively established, and the inscription does not preserve the name in a form that directly matches the standard Sanskrit rendering.Accordingly, the equation remains a scholarly hypothesis rather than an established identification.

== Sources ==
- Baums, Stefan. 2012. "Catalog and Revised Texts and Translations of Gandharan Reliquary Inscriptions." In: David Jongeward, Elizabeth Errington, Richard Salomon and Stefan Baums, Gandharan Buddhist Reliquaries, pp. 219–222, Seattle: Early Buddhist Manuscripts Project (Gandharan Studies, Volume 1).
- Baums, Stefan, and Andrew Glass. 2002– . Catalog of Gāndhārī Texts, no. CKI 48
- British Museum Collection Online Reg. No. 1889,0314.1
