= Sten Konow =

Norwegian indologist and philologist (1867–1948)

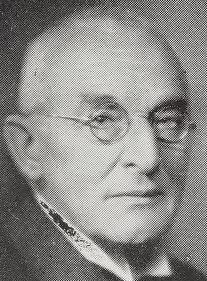
Sten Konow

Sten Konow (17 April 1867 – 29 June 1948) was a Norwegian Indologist. He was a professor of Indian philology at the Christiania University, Oslo, from 1910, until moving to Hamburg University in 1914, where he was a professor of Indian history and culture. He returned to Oslo as a professor of Indian languages and history in 1919. He was a specialist in the Tibeto-Burmese languages.

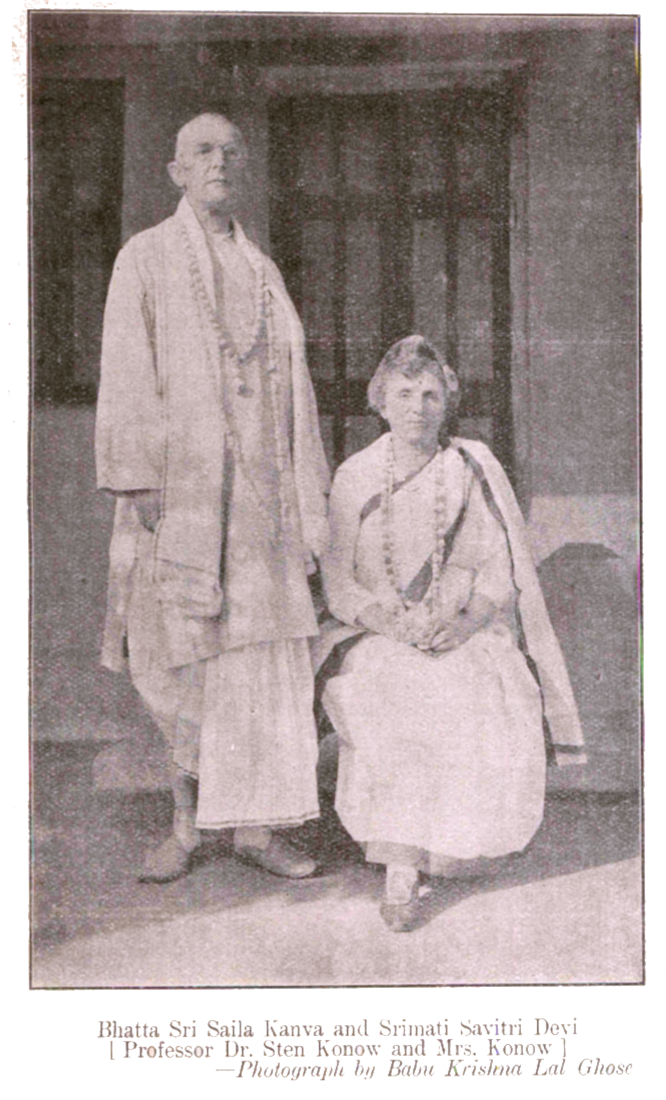
Konow and his wife in India

Konow was born in Sør-Aurdal Municipality in Oppland where his father, Wollert Otto Konow (1833–95) was a parish priest married to Henrikka Christiane Johanne Molde Wolff (1841–1927). Konow studied art, graduating from Lillehammer in 1884. He then studied in Kristiania before moving to Halle and worked in the Oslo University library for some time. In 1890, he collated a Norwegian lexicon. He returned to studies in Indian philology at the University of Halle under Richard Pischel and received a doctorate in 1893 with studies on the Sāmavidhānabrāhmana. He worked in Berlin from 1894 to 1896 and returned to Kristiania and worked as a research fellow. In 1900, he was hired to work in the Linguistic Survey of India under George Grierson. He continued to work on the survey from England and then from Norway. He translated Rajasekhara's Karpuramanjari, which was published as volume 4 of the Harvard Oriental Series in 1901. In 1906, he was appointed as a government epigraphist and travelled across India, taking part in excavations at Sarnath. He returned to Norway in 1908. He returned to become a professor at the University of Hamburg (1914-1919) and then at Oslo until he retired in 1937.

Konow married Anne Helene Schorcht née Heyerdahl (1869–1930) in 1904 and they had a daughter, Agnes Helene, who married Konow's student, the linguist Georg Morgenstierne. Along with Morgenstierne, he established that the "kaffir" languages of northern Afghanistan belonged to the Indo-Iranian language tree. Konow was a founding editor of the journal Acta Orientalia.
