= Aspavarma =

Apracha general

- Apracha King (Gāndhārī: Apacaraja)
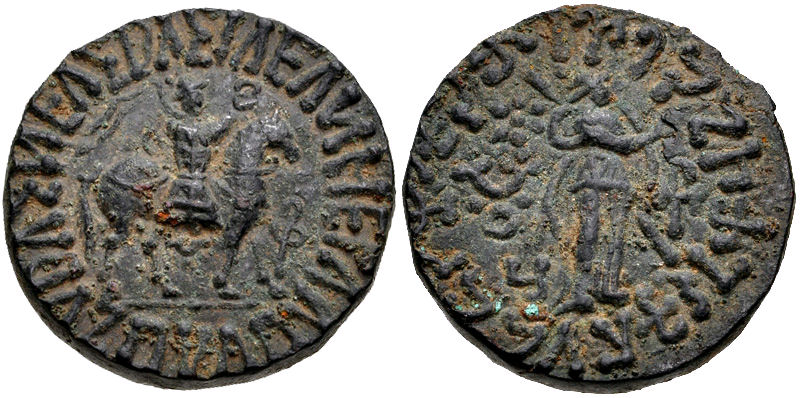
- Coin of Aspavarma; Obv King mounted on a horse, holding a whip. Greek legend around ΒΑΣΙΛΕΩΣ ΒΑΣΙΛΕΩΝ ΜΕΓΑΛΟΥ / ΑΖΟΥ. Rev Pallas Athena holding spear, and triratna symbol. Kharoshthi legend around Iṃdravarmaputrasa Aśpavarmasa strategasa jayatasa "Victorious general Aspavarma, son of Indravarma".
- Reign: 1st century (c. 15 CE - c. 45 CE)
- Predecessor: Indravarma
- Successor: Sasan
- House: Apracharajas
- Dynasty: Apracha
- Father: Indravarma
- Religion: Buddhism

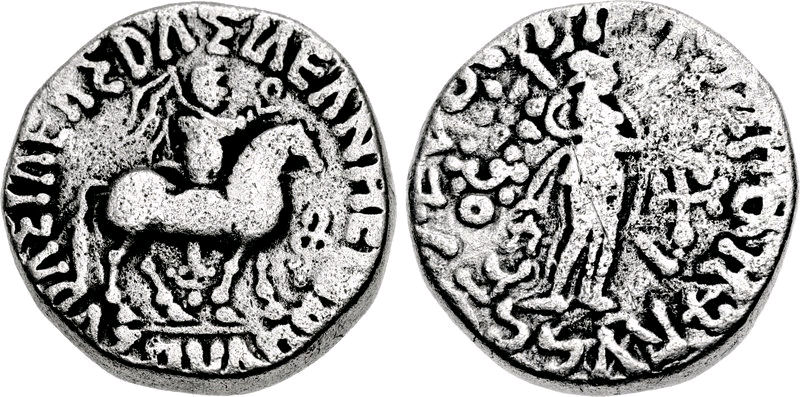
Apracaraja Aspavarma.

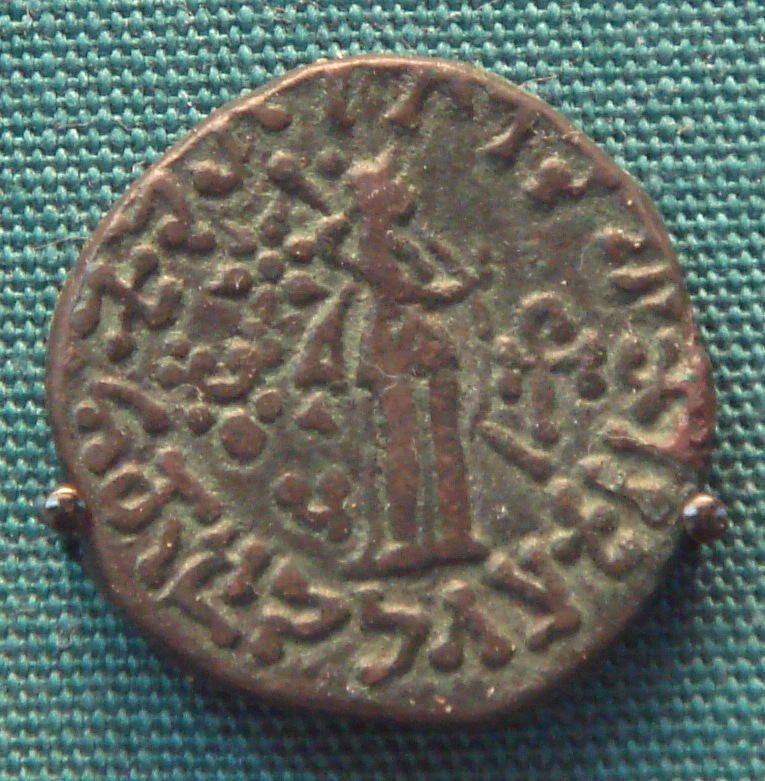
Coin of Aspavarma (reverse).

Aspavarma or Aspa (Kharosthi: 𐨀𐨭𐨿𐨤𐨬𐨪𐨿𐨨 A-śpa-va-rma, Aśpavarma) was an Apracha general who ruled in Gandhara. He was the son of the Apracharaja general Indravarma who ruled in 50 CE.

== Name ==
The Gandhārī name Aśpavarma is cognate of Sanskrit Aśvavarma, meaning "horse-protected" (from aśpa 'horse' and varma 'protection'). Gandhārī developed general reflex -śp from Old Indo-Aryan corresponding to Sanskrit -śv for the combination sibilant and labial, unlike other Middle Indo-Aryan but similar to Old Iranian, as in the case of the name Aśpavarma.

== Inscriptions ==
Asparvama was a son of Apraca king Indravarma, as known from an inscription discovered in Taxila, who himself is known to be the son of Vispavarma according to Indravarma's Silver Reliquary.

Indravarma's Silver Reliquary, which is known to be earlier than the Bajaur casket, hence before 5-6 CE, and is therefore usually dated to the end of the 1st century BCE, describes Aspavarma's grandfather Vispavarma as a general, and not yet a king at that time. This tends to confirm that his grandson, Aspavarma, probably ruled quite some time later, in the middle of the 1st century CE.

Aspavarma is also referenced in Gāndhārī texts, written in Kharoṣṭhī script, dating from the period.

== Coinage ==
The coinage shows the king on a horse, holding a whip in his right hand, in a style consistent with that of Azes II (who possibly is identical with Azes I). On the reverse, Athena makes a benediction gesture, and is flanked by a Buddhist triratna symbol.

According to Joe Cribb, from a coinage standpoint, Aspavarma was contemporary to Sases and Mujatria, just before the rule of Kushan ruler Vima Takto.

Aspavarma
Regnal titles
Preceded by Indravarma	Apracharaja c. 15 CE - c. 45 CE	Succeeded by Sasan

Territories/ dates	Western India	Western Pakistan Balochistan	Paropamisadae Arachosia	Bajaur	Gandhara	Western Punjab	Eastern Punjab	Mathura
			INDO-GREEK KINGDOM					
90–85 BCE			Nicias	Menander II		Artemidoros		
90–70 BCE			Hermaeus	Archebius				
85-60 BCE			INDO-SCYTHIAN KINGDOM; Maues					
75–70 BCE			Vonones; Spalahores	Telephos		Apollodotus II		
65–55 BCE			Spalirises; Spalagadames			Hippostratos	Dionysios	
55–35 BCE			Azes I				Zoilos II	
55–35 BCE			Azilises; Azes II				Apollophanes	Indo-Scythian dynasty of the NORTHERN SATRAPS; Hagamasha
25 BCE – 10 CE				Indo-Scythian dynasty of the APRACHARAJAS; Vijayamitra (ruled 12 BCE - 15 CE) (Note: From the dated inscription on the Rukhana reliquary)	Liaka Kusulaka; Patika Kusulaka; Zeionises	Kharahostes (ruled 10 BCE– 10 CE) (Note: An Inscribed Silver Buddhist Reliquary of the Time of King Kharaosta and Prince Indravarman, Richard Salomon, Journal of the American Oriental Society, Vol. 116, No. 3 (Jul. - Sep., 1996), pp. 442); Mujatria	Strato II and Strato III	Hagana
10-20 CE		INDO-PARTHIAN KINGDOM; Gondophares		Indravasu	INDO-PARTHIAN KINGDOM; Gondophares		Rajuvula	
20-30 CE			Ubouzanes; Pakores	Vispavarma (ruled c.0-20 CE) (Note: A Kharosthī Reliquary Inscription of the Time of the Apraca Prince Visnuvarma, by Richard Salomon, South Asian Studies 11 1995, Pages 27-32, Published online: 09 Aug 2010)	Sarpedones		Bhadayasa	Sodasa
30-40 CE			KUSHAN EMPIRE; Kujula Kadphises	Indravarma	Abdagases		...	...
40-45 CE				Aspavarma	Gadana		...	...
45-50 CE				Sasan	Sases		...	...
50-75 CE							...	...
75-100 CE	Indo-Scythian dynasty of the WESTERN SATRAPS; Chastana		Vima Takto				...	...
100-120 CE	Abhiraka		Vima Kadphises				...	...
120 CE	Bhumaka; Nahapana	PARATARAJAS; Yolamira	Kanishka I				Great Satrap Kharapallana and Satrap Vanaspara for Kanishka I	
130-230 CE	Jayadaman; Rudradaman I Damajadasri I Jivadaman; Rudrasimha I Satyadaman; Jivadaman; Rudrasena I	Bagamira; Arjuna; Hvaramira; Mirahvara	Vāsishka (c. 140 – c. 160); Huvishka (c. 160 – c. 190); Vasudeva I (c. 190 – to at least 230)					
230-280 CE	Samghadaman; Damasena; Damajadasri II; Viradaman; Isvaradatta; Yasodaman I Vijayasena; Damajadasri III; Rudrasena II; Visvasimha	Miratakhma; Kozana; Bhimarjuna; Koziya; Datarvharna; Datarvharna	INDO-SASANIANS; Ardashir I, Sassanid king and "Kushanshah" (c. 230 – 250); Peroz I, "Kushanshah" (c. 250 – 265); Hormizd I, "Kushanshah" (c. 265 – 295)			Kanishka II (c. 230 – 240); Vashishka (c. 240 – 250); Kanishka III (c. 250 – 275)		
280-300 CE	Bhratadarman	Datayola II	Hormizd II, "Kushanshah" (c. 295 – 300)			Vasudeva II (c. 275 – 310)		
300-320 CE	Visvasena; Rudrasimha II; Jivadaman		Peroz II, "Kushanshah" (c. 300 – 325)			Vasudeva III; Vasudeva IV; Vasudeva V Chhu (c. 310? – 325)		
320-388 CE	Yasodaman II; Rudradaman II; Rudrasena III; Simhasena; Rudrasena IV		Shapur II Sassanid king and "Kushanshah" (c. 325); Varhran I, Varhran II, Varhran III "Kushanshahs" (c. 325 – 350); Peroz III "Kushanshah" (c. 350 –360); HEPHTHALITE/ HUNAS invasions			Shaka I (c. 325 – 345); Kipunada (c. 345 – 375)		GUPTA EMPIRE; Chandragupta I Samudragupta
388-395 CE	Rudrasimha III		Chandragupta II					
