= Sases =

Sases (Sasan)
- Maharaja
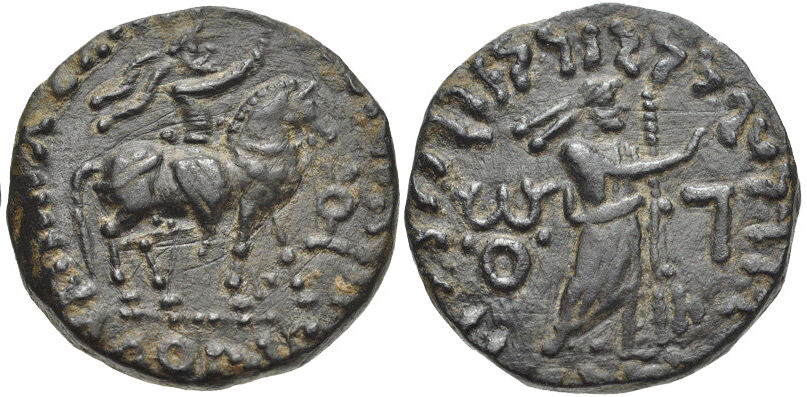
- Rev Kharoshthi inscription: "Great king of kings, divine and saviour, Gondophares Sases"
- Reign: 1st century CE
- Predecessor: Aspavarma (Apracharaja); Abdagases I (Indo-Parthian)
- Successor: Vima Takto (Kushan)
- Religion: Buddhism

Sases, also known as Gondophares IV Sases (Kharosthi: 𐨒𐨂𐨡𐨂𐨥𐨪 𐨯𐨯 Gu-du-pha-ra Sa-sa, Guduphara Sasa), sometimes named Sasan in the modern sources, was a king of the Indo-Parthian kingdom who ruled in Gandhara and the neighbouring areas. He is known solely from numismatic evidence, with his rule generally placed in the middle to the later half of the first century CE.

Probably hailing from the Apracha dynasty, at some point during his reign he assumed the title Gondophares after deposing Abdagases I, which was held by the supreme Indo-Parthian rulers. According to the alternative chronology advocated by Robert Senior, Sases is a likely candidate for several possible historical references to the Indo-Parthian kings of the 1st century CE, including in the Acts of Thomas and the Takht-i-Bahi inscription. Traditionally, these references have been thought to be about Gondophares I, as earlier scholars did not realise that "Gondophares" became a title after the death of this king.

== Rule ==
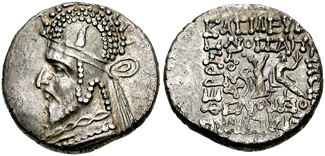
Coin of Gondophares-Sases from Seistan in the Parthian style (Early-mid 1st century CE). Obv King with Parthian-style tiara. Rev BACILEYC BACIL(EWN M)EGAC YND-OFEPPhC OEPON MAZOM NOC CAh. Gondophares with Nike standing behind, crowning him.

In one of his coinage legends, Sases (Sasa) describes himself as the paternal nephew of Aspa, probably Aspavarma (Aśvavarma) and hence a grandson of Indravarma. He overthrew the dynasty founded by Gondophares, and assumed the position following Abdagases I along with adopting the title of Gondophares.

The Kushan ruler Vima Takto is known through numismatic evidence to have over struck the coins of Sasan, whilst a numismatic hoard had found coins of Sasan together with smaller coins of Kujula Kadphises. It has also been discovered that Sasan over struck the coins of Nahapana of the Western Satraps, this line of coinage dating between 40 and 78 CE.

== Identification with Phraotes ==
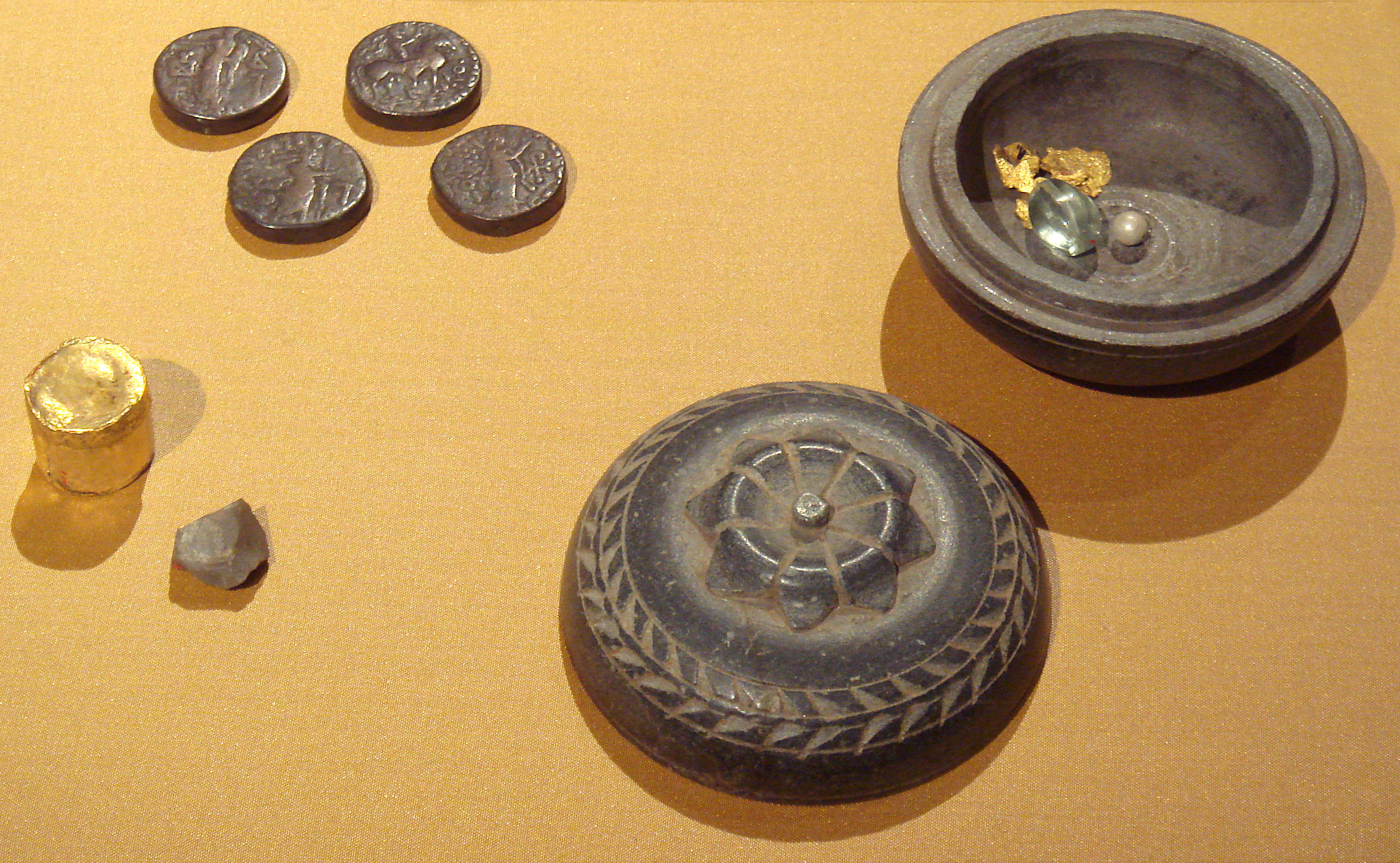
Buddhist reliquary with coinage, apparently of Sases. Sases inscribed a Buddhist triratna with his tamgha on some of his coins.

In the 1st century CE, Phraotes, a Greek-speaking king of the city of Taxila, was met by the philosopher Apollonius of Tyana dated approximately to 46 CE, according to the Life of Apollonius Tyana written by Philostratus. The Gondophares who fits this date is Gondophares IV Sases, whose coinage has been dated to 40–78 CE. Apollonius describes the king as an Indian.

== Family tree ==
Apracharajas

Vijayamitra^{(1)} r. c. 1st Century
Indravasu^{(2)} r. c. 1st Century
Vispavarma^{(3)} r. c. 1st Century
Indravarma^{(4)} r. c. 20–50 CE
Aspavarma^{(5)} r. c. 1st Century	Child of Indravarma
Sasa^{(6)} r. c. 1st Century

== See also ==
- Odirajas
- Indo-Scythian Kingdom
