= Silver Reliquary of Indravarman =

Buddhist reliquary

- Apracaraja Indravarman's Silver Reliquary
- Material: Silver
- Created: 1st century BCE
- Discovered: Bajaur

Location
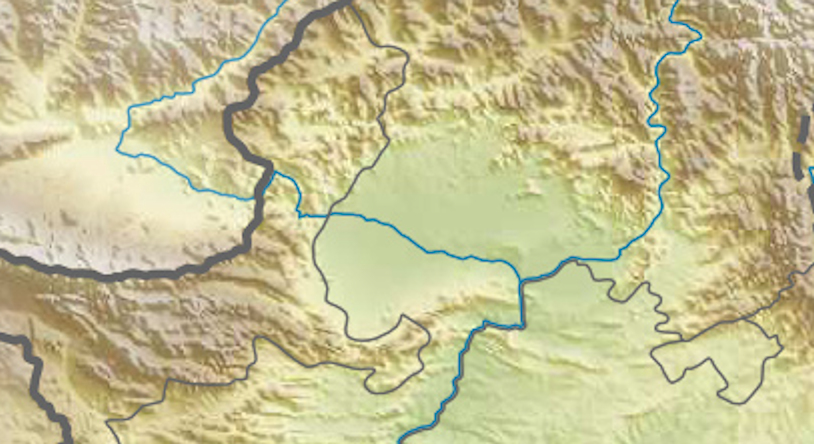

The Silver Reliquary of Indravarman is an inscribed silver Buddhist reliquary dedicated by Apracaraja king Indravarman in the 1st century BCE, (Note: The item belongs to the Shumei Culture Foundation in Otsu, Japan and was loaned to the Los Angeles County Museum of Art, when it was studied by Richard Salomon of the University of Washington, who examined and studied the inscriptions and published his results in Journal of the American Oriental Society, Vol 116, No 3, 1996, pp 1418-452.) which has been found presumably in the Bajaur area of Gandhara. (Note: IMPORTANT: Kapisa formed the heart of ancient Kamboja. In fact, scholars assert that Kapisa is an alternative name for the Kamboja. See main article: Kapisa Province) Believed to have been fabricated at Taxila, the silver reliquary consists of two parts—the base and the cover—both being fluted, (Note: Fluting is an Iranian motif (Richard Salomon).) and the cover being topped by a figure of long horned Ibex. It has been dated to around the eighth or ninth decades of the 1st century BCE and bears six inscriptions written in pointillē style, in Kharoshthi script and Gandhari/north-western Prakrit. In form, the silver vessel is wholly atypical of Buddhist reliquaries and is said to have been a wine goblet, similar to others found in Gandhara and Kapisa regions. The vessel was later reused by Apraca king Indravarman as a Reliquary to enshrine Buddhist relics in a stüpa raised by Indravarman. The inscriptions on the silver reliquary provide important new information not only about the history of the kings of Apraca dynasty themselves but also about their relationships with other rulers of the far north-western region of traditional India i.e. modern northern Pakistan and eastern Afghanistan around the beginning of Christian era.

The inscriptions on the silver reliquary have been investigated by Richard Salomon of the University of Washington, in an article published in the Journal of the American Oriental Society.

== Form and function ==
The lower part of the reliquary with fluted surface, carination and small stem and foot is extremely similar to the "drinking goblets" that have been found in good numbers mainly in Gandhara (Taxila) and Kapisa (Kapisi). The lower part of the reliquary resembles the ceremonial drinking cups depicted in ancient Gandharan art and culture relief. Gandharan art of Bacchanalian or Dionysiac drinking scenes are the motifs which represent assimilation of local folk traditions of remote river valleys of the Kafiristan where viticulture and wine festivals are known to have been widely practiced. Similar customs are also well documented in recent times in the region of Nuristan (pre-Islamic Kafiristan) which area had formed integral parts of ancient Kapisa. Bajaur, the presumed provenance of the silver reliquary, was part of the ancient Kapisa. In this very region of Kafiristan or ancient Kapisa, the heirloom silver wine cups (Note: Called ürei in Waigali.) with features very similar to those of old Gandhara and Kapisa goblets are still found and before the Islamization of Kafiristan, these silver wine cups were important ritual objects and symbols of social status. Martha Carter associates the well attested wine festival tradition of the valleys of Hindukush with Dionysiac scenes in Gandharan art in general and heirloom silver cups of the modern Nuristanis with Gandharan goblets in particular which is quite persuasive. (Note: It is worthy of note here that the warlike, highly independent and militarily dominating Siyah-posh clans like Kam/Kamoj/Kamtoj of Kafiristan/Nuristan the modern representatives of the ancient Kambojas of Kapisa territory (See: Mountstuart Elphinstone, "An account of the kingdom of Caubol", fn p 619; Journal of the Royal Asiatic Society, 1843, p 140; Journal of the Asiatic Society of Bengal, 1874, p 260 fn; Die altpersischen Keilinschriften: Im Grundtexte mit Uebersetzung, Grammatik und Glossar, 1881, p 86, Friedrich Spiegel; Political History of Ancient India, 1996, p 133, fn, Dr H. C. Raychaudhury, Dr B. N. Banerjee; The Achaemenids and India, 1974, p 13, Dr S Chattopadhyaya; Vishnu Purana, p 374, fn, H. H. Wilson; The Geographical Dictionary of Ancient and Medieval India, Numdo Lal Dey).)

According to Dr Richard Salomon, "if the association is even approximately correct, it may explain what the new silver reliquary originally may have been. It was undoubtedly a ceremonial silver drinking cup of Indo-Iranian king Kharaosta and later of his successor prince Indravarman who converted it into a sacred reliquary for the bones of Buddha". The Nuristani customs represents the survival in remote region of a local (Bajaur) tradition of ritual wine drinking which, in Buddhist world of Gandhara, may have been assimilated to and rationalized by the cosmological realm of the 'Sadamattas', who dwell on the slope of Mt Meru. The figure of Ibex topping the cover of the reliquary definitely implies Trans-Pamirian (Central Asian) influence and establishes a proof of early migration of people (Kambojas) from the Transoxian region (i.e., the Parama Kamboja of Central Asia or Scythian region) into the Kabul valley. The Ibex motif is quintessentially characteristic of Iranian and Central Asian (Scythian) art and culture. It reflects the arrival and assimilation, by whatever geographic route or routes, of this ancient Central Asian/Iranian motif into the Gandharan world in Pre-Christian times. And lastly, the fluting in the surfaces of the silver reliquary is also an Iranian motif. Thus the Ibex motif combined with wine drinking culture of the goblet itself amply illustrates the influx of regional and extra-regional cultural elements into the eclectic art and culture of Gandhara of the Indo-Iranian/Indo-Scythian period which is indeed reflected in the silver reliquary of prince Indravarman.

== Contents of inscriptions ==
Inscription of the Silver Reliquary of Indravarman
Inscription	Original (Kharosthi script)	Transliteration	English translation
Inscription I	𐨣𐨎	naṃ	naṃ
Inscription II	𐨨𐨱𐨐𐨿𐨮𐨟𐨿𐨪𐨤𐨤𐨂𐨟𐨿𐨪𐨯 𐨩𐨒𐨂𐨪𐨎𐨙 𐨑𐨪𐨩𐨆𐨯𐨿𐨟𐨯 𐨭 𐩅 𐩃 𐩃 𐨀𐨣 𐩃 𐨨 𐩀 𐩀	mahakṣatrapaputrasa yaguraṃña Kharayostasa śa 20 4 4 ana 4 ma 2	Of the son of the great satrap, the yagu king, Kharahostes, 28 staters, 4 dhānaka, 2 māṣa
Inscription III	𐨀𐨁𐨎𐨡𐨿𐨪𐨬𐨪𐨿𐨨𐨯 𐨐𐨂𐨨𐨪𐨯 𐨯 𐩅 𐩃 𐩃 𐨡𐨿𐨪 𐩀	Iṃdravarmasa kumarasa sa 20 4 4 dra 1	Of prince Indravarma, 28 staters, 1 drachm
Inscription IV	𐨀𐨁𐨎𐨡𐨿𐨪𐨬𐨪𐨿𐨨𐨯 𐨐𐨂𐨨𐨪𐨯 𐨯 𐩅 𐩅 𐩀 𐩀 𐩀	Iṃdravarmasa kumarasa sa 20 20 1 1 1	Of prince Indravarma, 43 staters
Inscription V	𐨬𐨁𐨭𐨿𐨤𐨬𐨪𐨿𐨨𐨯𐨿𐨟𐨿𐨪𐨟𐨅𐨒𐨤𐨂𐨟𐨿𐨪𐨅 𐨀𐨁𐨎𐨡𐨿𐨪𐨬𐨪𐨿𐨨 𐨐𐨂𐨨𐨪𐨅 𐨯𐨧𐨪𐨿𐨩𐨀𐨅 𐨀𐨁𐨨𐨅 𐨭𐨪𐨁𐨪 𐨤𐨪𐨁𐨛𐨬𐨅𐨟𐨁 𐨟𐨞𐨂𐨐𐨀𐨨𐨁 𐨠𐨂𐨦𐨨𐨁 𐨬𐨁𐨭𐨿𐨤𐨬𐨪𐨿𐨨𐨆 𐨯𐨿𐨟𐨿𐨪𐨟𐨅𐨒𐨆 𐨭𐨁𐨭𐨁𐨪𐨅𐨞 𐨩 𐨯𐨿𐨟𐨿𐨪𐨟𐨅𐨒 𐨧𐨪𐨿𐨩 𐨤𐨂𐨩𐨀𐨁𐨟 𐨀𐨁𐨎𐨡𐨿𐨪𐨬𐨯𐨂 𐨀𐨤𐨕𐨪𐨗 𐨬𐨯𐨂𐨨𐨁𐨡𐨿𐨪 𐨕 𐨗𐨁𐨀𐨤𐨂𐨟𐨿𐨪 𐨤𐨂𐨩𐨀𐨁𐨟 𐨀𐨁𐨎𐨡𐨿𐨪𐨬𐨪𐨿𐨨𐨆 𐨯𐨿𐨟𐨿𐨪𐨟𐨅𐨒𐨆 𐨀𐨂𐨟𐨪 𐨩 𐨯𐨿𐨟𐨿𐨪𐨟𐨅𐨒𐨧𐨪𐨿𐨩 𐨤𐨂𐨩𐨀𐨁𐨟 𐨬𐨁𐨩𐨅 𐨨𐨁𐨟𐨿𐨪𐨆 𐨀𐨬𐨕𐨪𐨩𐨆 𐨯𐨧𐨪𐨿𐨩𐨀𐨆 𐨤𐨂𐨩𐨀𐨁𐨟𐨆 𐨯𐨪𐨿𐨬𐨙𐨡𐨁𐨯𐨓𐨆 𐨤𐨂𐨩𐨀𐨁𐨟 𐨯𐨪𐨿𐨬𐨯𐨟𐨿𐨬 𐨤𐨂𐨩𐨀𐨁𐨟 𐨯𐨬𐨯𐨟𐨿𐨬 𐨤𐨟𐨁𐨞𐨁𐨬𐨀𐨁𐨟𐨆	Viśpavarmastrategaputre Iṃdravarma kumare sabharyae ime śarira pariṭhaveti taṇukaami thubami Viśpavarmo stratego Śiśireṇa ya stratega- bharya puyaïta Iṃdravasu Apacaraja Vasumidra ca jiaputra puyaïta Iṃdravarmo stratego Utara ya strategabharya puyaïta Viye- mitro Avacarayo sabharyao puyaïto sarvañadisagho puyaïta sarvasatva puyaïta savasatva patiṇivaïto	The son of the general Viśpavarma, the prince Indravarma, with his wife, here these relics establishes in his personal stupa. General Viśpavarma and Śiśireṇa, the general's wife, are honoured. Indravasu, king of Apraca, and Vasumitra, who has a living son, are honoured. General Indravarma and Utara, the wife of the general, are honoured. Vijayamitra, the Avaca king, together with his wife, is honoured. The community of all relatives is honoured. All beings are honoured. All beings are brought to nirvana.
Inscription VI	𐨬𐨁𐨭𐨿𐨤𐨬𐨪𐨿𐨨𐨯 𐨯𐨿𐨟𐨿𐨪𐨟𐨅𐨒𐨯 𐨤𐨂𐨟𐨿𐨪𐨅 𐨀𐨁𐨎𐨡𐨿𐨪𐨬𐨪𐨿𐨨 𐨐𐨂𐨨𐨪𐨅 𐨯𐨧𐨪𐨿𐨩𐨀𐨅 𐨀𐨁𐨨𐨅 𐨭𐨪𐨁𐨪 𐨤𐨿𐨪𐨟𐨁𐨛𐨬𐨅𐨟𐨁 𐨟𐨞𐨂𐨀𐨐𐨨𐨁 𐨠𐨂𐨦𐨨𐨁 𐨬𐨁𐨭𐨿𐨤𐨬𐨪𐨿𐨨𐨆 𐨯𐨿𐨟𐨿𐨪𐨟𐨅𐨒𐨆 𐨭𐨁𐨭𐨁𐨪𐨅𐨞 𐨩 𐨯𐨿𐨟𐨿𐨪𐨟𐨅𐨒𐨧𐨪𐨿𐨩 𐨤𐨂𐨩𐨀𐨁𐨟 𐨀𐨁𐨎𐨡𐨿𐨪𐨬𐨯𐨂 𐨀𐨤𐨕𐨪𐨗 𐨬𐨯𐨂𐨨𐨁𐨟𐨿𐨪 𐨩 𐨗𐨁𐨬𐨤𐨂𐨟𐨿𐨪 𐨤𐨂𐨩𐨀𐨁𐨟𐨎 𐨀𐨁𐨎𐨡𐨿𐨪𐨬𐨪𐨿𐨨𐨆 𐨯𐨿𐨟𐨿𐨪𐨟𐨅𐨒𐨆 𐨤𐨂𐨩𐨀𐨁𐨟 𐨀𐨂𐨟𐨪 𐨯𐨿𐨟𐨿𐨪𐨟𐨅𐨒𐨧𐨪𐨿𐨩 𐨤𐨂𐨩𐨀𐨁𐨟 𐨬𐨁𐨩𐨅𐨨𐨁𐨟𐨿𐨪𐨆 𐨀𐨬𐨕𐨪𐨩𐨆 𐨯𐨧𐨪𐨿𐨩𐨀𐨆 𐨤𐨂𐨩𐨀𐨁𐨟 𐨯𐨪𐨿𐨬𐨙𐨡𐨁𐨯𐨓𐨆 𐨤𐨂𐨩𐨀𐨁𐨟 𐨯𐨪𐨿𐨬𐨯𐨟𐨿𐨬 𐨩 𐨤𐨂𐨩𐨀𐨁𐨟 𐨯𐨪𐨿𐨬𐨯𐨟𐨿𐨬 𐨤𐨪𐨁𐨞𐨁𐨬𐨀𐨁𐨟𐨆	Viśpavarmasa strategasa putre Iṃdravarma kumare sabharyae ime śarira pratiṭhaveti taṇuakami thubami Viśpavarmo stratego Śiśireṇa ya strategabharya puyaïta Iṃdravasu Apacaraja Vasumitra ya jivaputra puyaïtaṃ Iṃdravarmo stratego puyaïta Utara strategabharya puyaïta Viyemitro Avacarayo sabharyao puyaïta sarvañadisagho puyaïta sarvasatva ya puyaïta sarvasatva pariṇivaïto	The son of the general Vispavarma, the prince Indravarma, together with his wife, here these relics establishes in his personal stupa. The general Vispavarma and Śiśireṇa, the wife of the general, are honoured. Indravasu the Apaca king, and Vasumitra, who has a living son, are honoured. General Indravarma is honoured. Utara, the wife of the general, is honoured. Vijatamitra, king of Avaca, together with his wife, is honoured. The community of all beings is honoured and all beings are honoured. All beings are brought to nirvana.

== Apracarajas' relations with yuvaraja Kharaosta ==
The inscriptions refer to several well-known historical figures and also introduce some previously unknown persons. Noteworthy among the former are prince Indravarman and king Khara(y)osta who is to be identified with ruler Kharahostes or Kharaosta who had been known from numismatics and Mathura Lion Capital inscriptions. The Inscription no. II also establishes that king Kharaosta was also the original owner and the silver vessel was later inherited by Apraca dynasty. Thus it very offers tantalizing hints of some close relationship between king Kharaosta and the Apraca kings of Bajaur.

== Bajaur, the home of Aspasioi clan ==
The territory around the findspot for the silver reliquary was the stronghold of the warlike Indo-Iranian people called Aspasioi (Note: Arrian calls them Aspasioi. The people derived their name from Iranian Aspa = horse. Pāṇini calls them Aśvayanas.) (Aspasian) who had formed the western branch of the Ashvakas (Note: From Sanskrit Ashva = horse. Arrian calls them Assakenoi. They were the eastern branch of the Ashvakas mentioned as Ashvakayanas by Pāṇini's Ashtadhyayi, Ashvakas in Mahabharata.) of the Sanskrit texts. (Note: It is also important to note that the name of one of the kings of Apraca dynasty is Aspavarman. This king has also been referred to simply as Aspa i.e. Aspa-bhrata-putrasa. Aspavarman was son of Apraca king Indravarman. The "Aspa" part of the name (Aspavarman) alludes to connections with the Aspasians or Aspasioi of Arrian.) (Note: Many kings of Apraca dynasty have used Varman as the surname or last name. Varman as surname implies Kshatriya caste and has been used by Ksatyriya lineages in ancient times (See entry "Varman" in Monier Williams Sanskrit-English Dictionary; See also entry "Varman" in: Cologne Digital Sanskrit English Dictionary). It is worthy to note that the Kambojas have repeatedly been described as Kshatriyas in ancient Indian texts (See:Pāṇini's Astadhyayi Sutra 4.1.168-175; Harivamsa 14.19-20; Vayu Purana, 88.127-43; Manusmriti X.43-44; Mahabharata 13.33.20-21); Cf also: (Mahabharata 13.35.17-18); Kautiliya's Arthashastra 11.1.1-4. Thus the fact that many kings of the Apraca dynasty used Varman last name indicates that the Apraca dynasty belonged to Kshatriya lineage and hence most likely belonged to the Ashvaka branch of the Indo-Iranian Kamboja tribe.) Prashant Srivastava of the University of Lucknow, has in a research monograph highlighted the significant role played by the family of the Apraca kings in ancient Indian history, and connected this family of the Apraca kings with the Ashvaka clan. But, the Ashvaka clan was none else than a sub-branch of the greater Kamboja tribe spread on either side of the Hindukush. (See Ashvakas.) These people, identified as sub-branch of the Kambojas, had earlier offered stubborn resistance to Macedonian invader Alexander in 326 BCE and later also constituted an important component of the grand army of Chandragupta Maurya. (Note: They find pre-eminent mention as Kambojas in the Rock Edicts V as well XIII of king Ashoka (reign 273 BCE to 232 BCE) located in Shabaz Garhi in Peshawar Valley and Mansehra District of North-West Frontier Province, Pakistan.) According to Dr Bailey, the dynastic/geographic title Apraca/Apaca/Avaca may underlie the modern toponym Bajaur.

== Kharayosta or Kharaosta king vs Apraca dynasty ==
The inscriptions provide important new information on the history of Apraca dynasty of Bajaur, including the names of several previously unknown persons, and on their relationship with Indo-Iranian king Kharayosta—the Yuvaraya Kharaosta "Kamuio" of the Mathura Lion Capital inscriptions or Kharaoṣta (Kharahostes) of the coins. Prince Kharaosta in the Bajaur silver vessel has been described as Yagu-raja as contrasted to Yuva-raja of the Mathura Lion Capital Inscriptions or the Kshatrapa of the coins. First part Yagu- of the title Yagu-raja used by Kharaosta (Kamuio) is a form of Yauvuga or Yauga or Yaüvasa—a Kushana title, which is identified with popular Turkic title Yabgu (i.e. tribal chief). Since this reference pertains to pre-Christian and therefore, pre-Kushana/Pre-Turkic times, this conclusively proves that the use of a title is no proof of a ruler's ethnic affinities. The silver reliquary definitely indicates some sort of connections between prince Kharaosta (Khara(y)osta) and the Apraca kings of Bajaur but it is hard to say if the connections are merely of succession only or were formed by blood or ethnic bonds also. The inscription no. II on the silver reliquary was inscribed by yaguraja Khara(y)osata who was the first owner of the silver vessel and the inscriptions no. III, IV, VI and VI on the same reliquary were later inscribed by Apraca king Indravarman which show the latter as the owner of the same vessel. Inscriptions also verify that Apraca king Indravarman had later converted the silver vessel to a Buddhist Reliquary for the stüpa he had raised in Bajaur.

The connection of Apraca kings with Yagu-raja Kharaosta has raised chronological questions which call into doubt previously established norms about him and also seem to require a considerably earlier date for the Mathura Lion Capital Inscriptions (in which he is twice mentioned as Yuvaraja Kharaosta), than is usually attributed to him. Kharaosta is believed to have been the ruler of Cukhsa—a territory comprising districts of Peshawar, Hazara, Attock and Mianwal in northern Pakistan. The Apraca kings of Bajaur are believed to have been an important allies of Kharaosta in helping to protect his borders from ever-present threat of invasion from the west. It does not, therefore, seem unlikely that Arta (Mahakshatrapa), Kharaosta Kamuio (Yuvaraja), Aiyasia Kamuia (Agramahisi—the chief queen of Rajuvula), Maues or Moga (Gandhara king) as well as the rulers of Apraca dynasty of Bajaur were probably all related and were connected by some sort of familial connections. The fact that Kharaosta and his daughter Aiyasi have both been referred to as Kamuias in the Mathura Lion Capital inscriptions may also hold a clue that the Apraca dynasty was also probably a Kamuia (Kamboja) dynasty. The surname Kamuia is a Kharoshthised/Prakritised form of Pali Kambojika or Sanskrit Kamboja. (Note: "I shall only add that if Kharaosta and his father Arta were Kambojas, the same may have been the case with Moga, and we understand why the Kambojas are sometimes mentioned with the Sakas and Yavanas"; See also: Ancient India, pp 320-21, Dr R. K. Mukerjee; Journal of Indian History - 1921, p viii, University of Kerala, University of Allahabad Department of Modern Indian History, University of Travancore; Ancient Kamboja, People and the Country, 1981, pp 41, 306-09, Dr J. L. Kamboj; These Kamboj People, 1979, p 141; Balocistān: Siyāsī Kashmakash, Muz̤mirāt Va Rujḥānāt, 1989, p 2, Munīr Aḥmad Marrīتاريخ قوم كمبوه: جديد تحقيق كى روشنى ميں, 1996, p 221, Yusuf Husain etc.) See main article: Kamuia

== See also ==
- Cetiya
- Bimaran reliquary
- Indravarma reliquary
- Kanishka reliquary
- Rukhuna reliquary
- Apracharajas

== Footnotes ==
=== Bibliography ===
- Bailey, H. W. (1978). "Two Kharoṣṭhī casket inscriptions from Avaca". Journal of the Royal Asiatic Society of Great Britain and Ireland. 1 (1): 3–13. doi:10.1017/S0035869X00134173. JSTOR 25210913. S2CID 162458870.
- Caillat, Colette, ed. (1989). "Gandhari ecritic, Gandhari parlee". Dialectes dans les littératures indo-aryennes.
- Konow, Sten, ed. (1929). Corpus Inscriptionum Indicarum, Vol II, Part I. Calcutta.
- Mukerjee, B. N. (1996). Political History of Ancient India.
- Salomon, Richard (1984). "A Kharosthi inscription on a silver goblet". Bulletin of the Asia Institute. 4.
- Salomon, Richard (1996). "An inscribed silver Buddhist reliquary of the time of King Kharaosta and Prince Indravarman". Journal of the American Oriental Society. 116 (3): 418–452. doi:10.2307/605147. JSTOR 605147.
- Srivastava, Prashant (2007). The Apracharajas: a History Based on Coins and Inscriptions. Agam Kala Prakashan. ISBN 978-81-7320-074-8.
