= Rukhuna reliquary =

Buddhist reliquary

- Outside view of the Rukhuna reliquary, and inscription inside the lid. The dates in Kharoshthi are highlighted and shown in arabic numbers. Photograph published by Richard Salomon in 2005.
- Material: Polished grey schist.
- Size: 16x16 centimeters.
- Writing: Kharoshthi
- Created: 16 CE
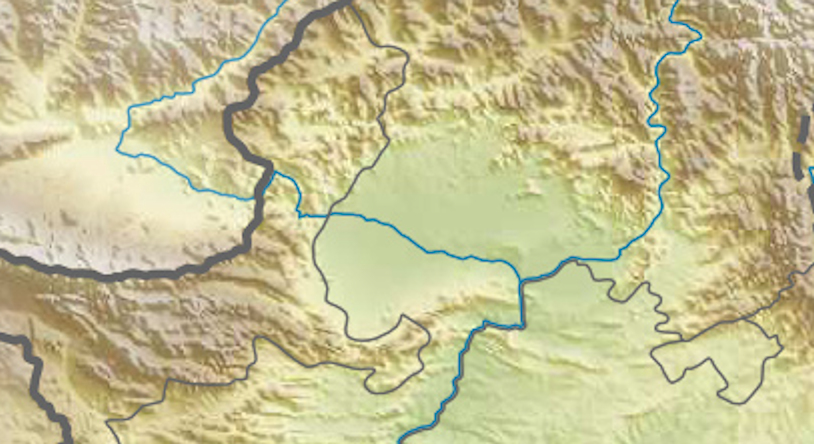
- Location of the discovery of the find of the Rukhana reliquary, Bajaur, Pakistan. Bajaur (Gandhara)

The Rukhuna reliquary, also sometimes Rukhana reliquary, also described as the Bajaur reliquary inscription, is a Scythian reliquary which was dedicated and inscribed in 16 CE by Rukhuna, Queen of Indo-Scythian king Vijayamitra (ruled 12 BCE - 20 CE). The inscription on the reliquary, also called the Bajaur reliquary inscription, was published by Richard Salomon with a photograph in 2005, and gives a relationship between several eras of the period, and especially a confirmation of a Yavana era (Yoṇaṇa vaṣaye) in relation to the Azes era, that is "Azes era= Yavana era - 128 years".

== Inscription ==
The inscription is very useful to clarify relative chronologies during the period. The inscription reads:

Rukhuna reliquary
Original (Kharosthi)	Transliteration	English translation
𐨬𐨮𐨩𐨅 𐨯𐨟𐨬𐨁𐨭𐨩𐨅 𐩅 𐩃 𐩀 𐩀 𐩀 𐨀𐨁𐨭𐨿𐨤𐨪𐨯	vaṣaye sataviśaye 20 4 1 1 1 iśparasa	In the twenty-seventh - 27 - of the lord
𐨬𐨁𐨗𐨩𐨨𐨁𐨟𐨿𐨪𐨯 𐨀𐨤𐨕𐨪𐨗𐨯 𐨀𐨞𐨂𐨭𐨯𐨿𐨟𐨁𐨩𐨅 𐨩𐨅 𐨬𐨂𐨕𐨟𐨁 𐨀𐨩𐨯	Vijayamitrasa Apacarajasa aṇuśastiye ye vucati Ayasa	Vijayamitra's, king of Apraca, rule, which is called Azes'
𐨬𐨮𐨩𐨅 𐨟𐨿𐨪𐨅𐨯𐨟𐨟𐨁𐨨𐨀𐨅 𐩅 𐩅 𐩅 𐩄 𐩀 𐩀 𐩀 𐨩𐨆𐨞𐨞 𐨬𐨮𐨩𐨅 𐨀𐨅𐨐𐨡𐨂𐨭𐨟𐨁𐨨𐨩𐨅	vaṣaye tresatatimae 20 20 20 10 1 1 1 Yoṇaṇa vaṣaye ekaduśatimaye	seventy-third - 73 - year, in the two-hundred-and-first year of the Greeks -
𐩀 𐩀 𐩆 𐩀 𐨭𐨿𐨪𐨬𐨞𐨯 𐨨𐨯𐨯 𐨡𐨁𐨬𐨯𐨩𐨅 𐨀𐨛𐨨𐨩𐨅 𐨀𐨁𐨭 𐨡𐨁𐨬𐨯𐨎𐨨𐨁 𐨤𐨿𐨪𐨟𐨁𐨳𐨩𐨁𐨡𐨂 𐨠𐨂𐨬𐨅	2 100 1 Śravaṇasa masasa divasaye aṭhamaye iśa divasaṃmi pratiṭ́havidu thuve	201 - in the month of Śrāvaṇa, on the eighth day, on that day is established a Stupa
𐨪𐨂𐨑𐨂𐨞𐨩𐨅 𐨀𐨤𐨕𐨪𐨗𐨧𐨪𐨿𐨩𐨀𐨅 𐨬𐨁𐨗𐨩𐨨𐨁𐨟𐨿𐨪𐨅𐨞 𐨀𐨤𐨿𐨪𐨕𐨪𐨗𐨅𐨞 𐨀𐨁𐨎𐨡𐨿𐨪𐨬𐨪𐨿𐨨𐨅𐨞 𐨯𐨿𐨟𐨿𐨪𐨟𐨅𐨒𐨅𐨞 𐨯𐨧𐨪𐨿𐨩𐨪𐨅𐨱𐨁 𐨯𐨐𐨂𐨨𐨪𐨅𐨱𐨁	Rukhuṇaye Apacarajabharyae Vijayamitreṇa Apracarajeṇa Iṃdravarmeṇa strategeṇa sabharyarehi sakumarehi	by Rukhuṇa, wife of the king of Apraca, by Vijayamitra, king of Apraca, by general Indravarma, together with their wives and their sons.

In Kharoshthi, the referential dates at the beginning of the inscription appear both in words and in numbers, together with the name of the era they are calculated in, and are given as follows:

vaṣaye sataviśaye 20 4 1 1 1 iśparasa Vijayamitrasa Apacarajasa aṇuśastiye ye vucati

"In the twenty-seventh - 27 - year in the reign of Lord Vijayamitra, the King of the Apraca"
ayasa vaṣaye tresa⟨*ta⟩timae 20 20 20 10 1 1 1
"in the seventy-third - 73 - year which is called "of Azes""
Yoṇaṇa vaṣaye ekaduśatimaye 2 100 1
"in the two hundred and first - 201 - year of the Yonas (Greeks)"
Śravaṇasa masasa divasaye aṭhamaye iśa divasaṃmi pratiṭ́havidu thuve Rukhuṇaye Apacarajabharyae Vijayamitreṇa Apracarajeṇa Iṃdravarmeṇa strategeṇa sabharyarehi sakumarehi

"on the eighth day of the month of Sravana; on this day was established [this] stupa by Rukhuna, the wife of the King of Apraca, [and] by Vijayamitra, the king of Apraca, [and] by Indravarma (Indravasu?), the commander (stratega), [together] with their wives and sons."

— Kharoshthi dates in the Rukhuna reliquary

This dedication also indicates that King Vijayamitra and his wife Rukhuna were followers of Buddhism.

Since Vijamitra is said to have ruled 27 years already, his reign started in 12 BCE, and ended probably a few years after the dedication took place, around 20 CE.

The authenticity of the inscription is nearly unanimously accepted by the academic community, Gérard Fussman being a dissenting voice.

== Similar examples of reliquaries ==
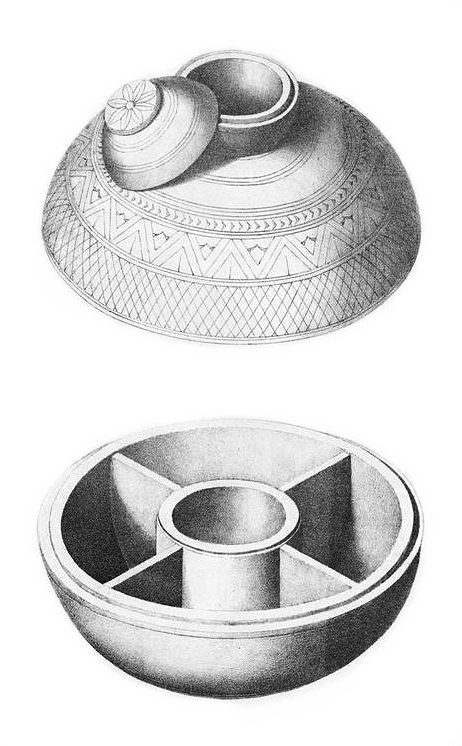
The Darunta reliquary from Passani Stupa No.2 is structurally similar to the Rukhuna reliquary, especially with the inside compartments.

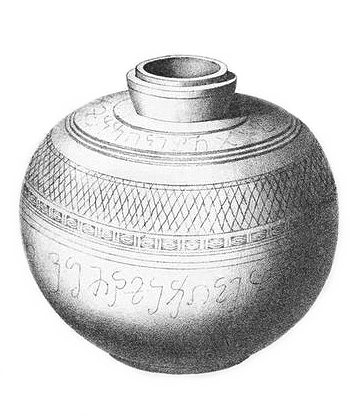
Another similar example: the Bimaran casket. This reliquary is inscribed on the outside, rather than the inside.

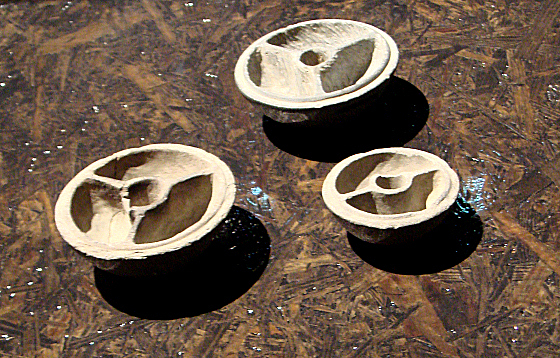
Broadly similar stone containers with compartments from Ai-Khanoum, 2nd century BCE.

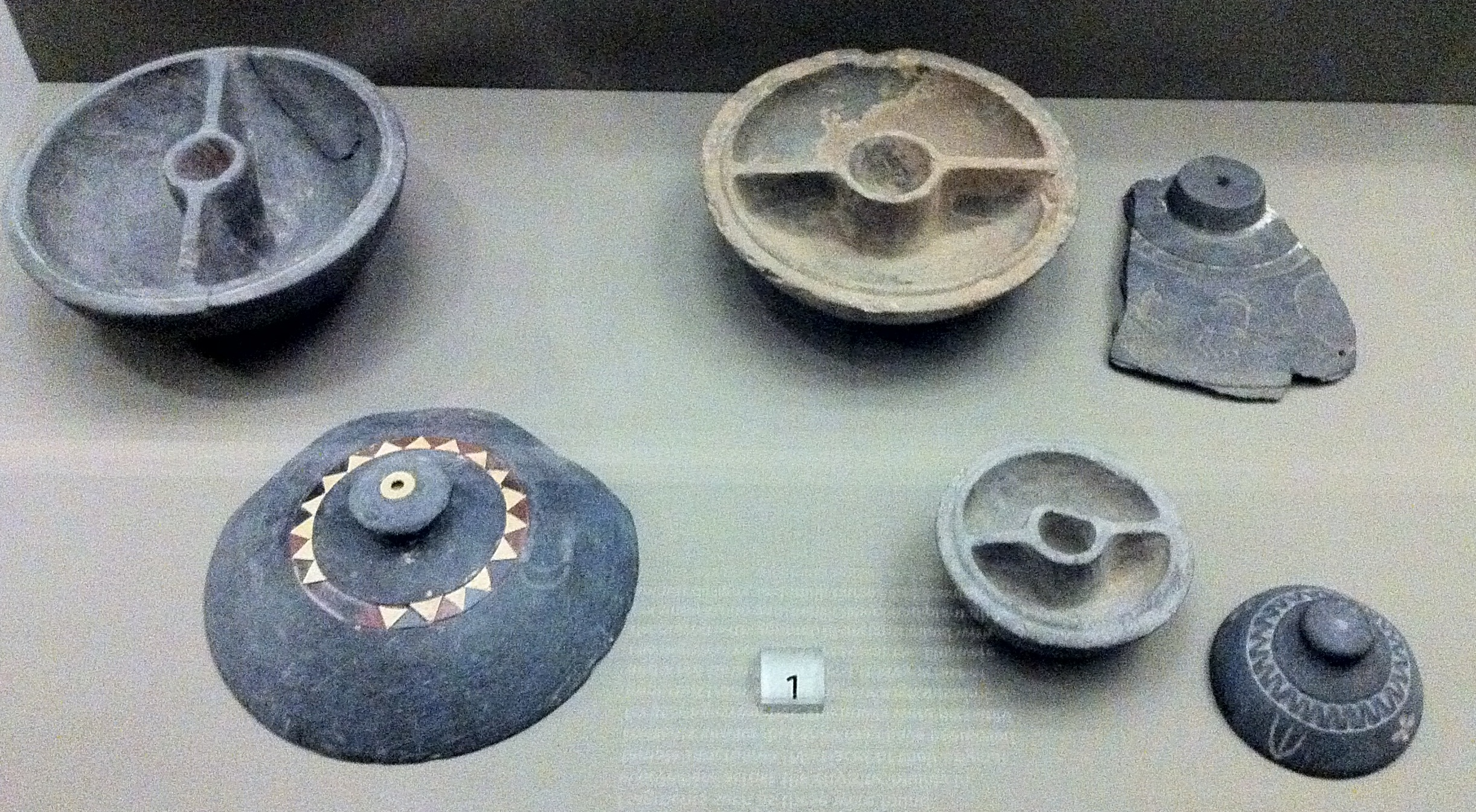
Stone vessels (pyxides) from the Temple with niches, Sanctuary of Ai-Khanoum, 3rd-2nd century BCE.
