= Bajaur casket =

Buddhist reliquary in Pakistan

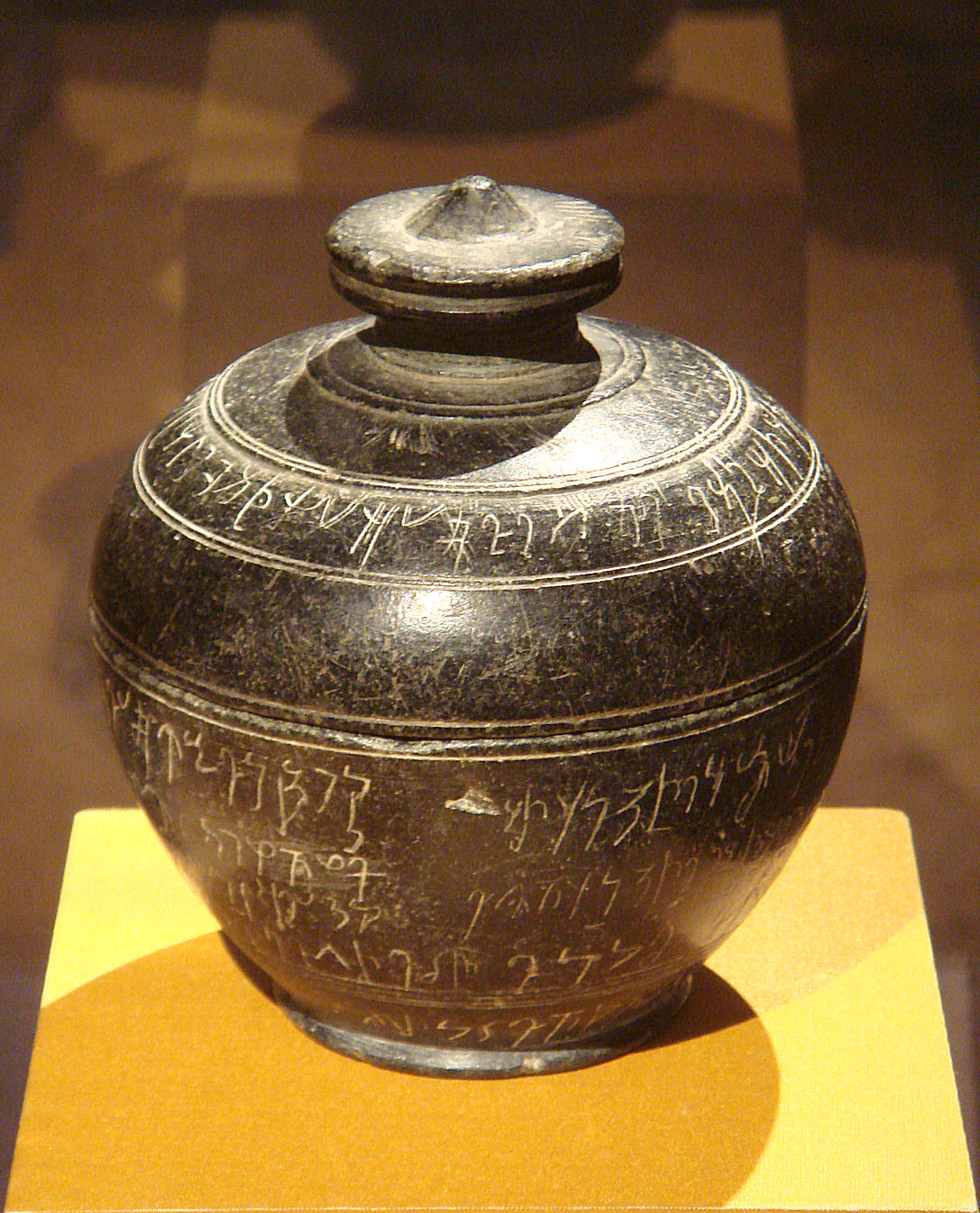
- The Bajaur casket, Metropolitan Museum of Art
- Created: 1st century CE
- Discovered: Bajaur

Location
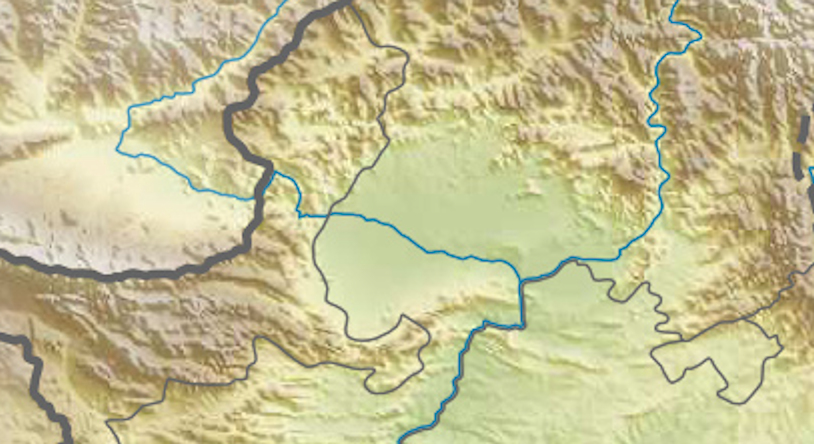

The Bajaur casket, also called the Indravarma reliquary, year 63, or sometimes referred to as the Avaca inscription, is an ancient reliquary from the area of Bajaur in ancient Gandhara, in the present-day Khyber Pakhtunkhwa, Pakistan. It is dated to around 5–6 CE. It proves the involvement of the kings of the Apraca, in particular King Indravarman, in Buddhism. The casket is made of schist.

The inscription which is written in Kharoshthi:

Inscription of the Bajaur casket
Inscription	Original (Kharosthi script)	Transliteration	English translation
Line 1	𐨯𐨎𐨬𐨟𐨿𐨯𐨪𐨀𐨅 𐨟𐨿𐨪𐨅𐨮𐨛𐨁𐨨𐨀𐨅 𐩅 𐩅 𐩅 𐩀 𐩀 𐩀 𐨨𐨱𐨪𐨩𐨯 𐨀𐨩𐨯 𐨀𐨟𐨁𐨡𐨯 𐨐𐨪𐨿𐨟𐨁𐨀𐨯 𐨨𐨯𐨯 𐨡𐨁𐨬𐨯𐨀𐨅 𐨮𐨆𐨜𐨭𐨀𐨅 𐨀𐨁𐨨𐨅𐨞 𐨕𐨅𐨟𐨿𐨪𐨁𐨐 𐨐𐨿𐨮𐨞 𐨀𐨁𐨡𐨿𐨪𐨬𐨪𐨿𐨨𐨅 𐨐𐨂𐨨𐨪𐨅 𐨀𐨤𐨿𐨪𐨕𐨪𐨗𐨤𐨂𐨟𐨿𐨪𐨅	saṃvatsarae treṣaṭhimae 20 20 20 1 1 1 maharayasa Ayasa atidasa Kartiasa masasa divasae ṣoḍaśae imeṇa cetrika kṣaṇa Idravarme kumare Apracarajaputre	In the year sixty-third - 63 - of the great king Azes I, during the month of Kārttika, on the sixteenth day, at this moment, the Caitrika prince Indravarma, son of the king of Apraca
Line 2	𐨀𐨁𐨨𐨅 𐨧𐨒𐨬𐨟𐨆 𐨭𐨐𐨿𐨩𐨨𐨂𐨞𐨁𐨯 𐨭𐨪𐨁𐨪 𐨤𐨿𐨪𐨡𐨁𐨛𐨬𐨅𐨟𐨁 𐨛𐨁𐨀𐨀𐨅 𐨒𐨧𐨁𐨪𐨀𐨅 𐨀𐨤𐨿𐨪𐨡𐨁𐨛𐨬𐨁𐨟𐨤𐨿𐨪𐨬𐨅 𐨤𐨟𐨅𐨭𐨅 𐨦𐨿𐨪𐨨𐨿𐨨𐨤𐨂𐨙𐨆 𐨤𐨿𐨪𐨯𐨬𐨟𐨁 𐨯𐨢 𐨨𐨡𐨂𐨞 𐨪𐨂𐨑𐨂𐨞𐨐𐨀 𐨗𐨁𐨤𐨂𐨟𐨿𐨪𐨀𐨅 𐨀𐨤𐨿𐨪𐨕𐨪𐨗𐨧𐨪𐨿𐨩𐨀𐨅	ime Bhagavato Śakyamuṇisa śarira pradiṭhaveti ṭhiae gabhirae apradiṭhavitaprave pateśe brammapuño prasavati sadha maduṇa Rukhuṇakaa jiputrae Apracarajabharyae	established this relic of the Holy Śākya sage in a secure, deep, and previously unestablished, place. He produces Brahman merit together with his mother Rukhuṇaka, who has a living son, wife of the king of Apraca;
Line 3	𐨯𐨢 𐨨𐨀𐨂𐨫𐨅𐨞 𐨪𐨨𐨐𐨅𐨞 𐨯𐨢 𐨨𐨀𐨂𐨫𐨞𐨁𐨀𐨅 𐨡𐨮𐨐𐨀𐨅 𐨯𐨢 𐨭𐨿𐨤𐨯𐨡𐨪𐨅𐨱𐨁 𐨬𐨯𐨬𐨡𐨟𐨀𐨅 𐨨𐨱𐨬𐨅𐨡𐨀𐨅 𐨞𐨁𐨐𐨀𐨅 𐨕 𐨒𐨱𐨁𐨞𐨁𐨀𐨅 𐨩 𐨀𐨂𐨟𐨪𐨀𐨅	sadha maüleṇa Ramakeṇa sadha maülaṇie Daṣakae sadha śpasadarehi Vasavadatae mahavedae Ṇikae ca gahiṇie ya Utarae	together with his maternal uncle Ramaka, together with his maternal uncle's wife Daṣaka, together with his sisters and wife, Vasavadata, Mahaveda, and Ṇika, and the lady of the house, Utara,
Line 4	𐨤𐨁𐨟𐨂 𐨀 𐨤𐨂𐨩𐨀𐨅 𐨬𐨁𐨮𐨸𐨂𐨬𐨪𐨿𐨨𐨯 𐨀𐨬𐨕𐨪𐨩𐨯	pitu a puyae Viṣṇuvarmasa Avacarayasa	and in honour of his father Viṣṇuvarma, king of the Apraca.
Line 5	𐨧𐨿𐨪𐨡 𐨬𐨒 𐨯𐨿𐨟𐨿𐨪𐨟𐨅𐨒𐨆 𐨤𐨂𐨩𐨀𐨁𐨟𐨅 𐨬𐨁𐨗𐨩𐨨𐨁𐨟𐨿𐨪𐨆 𐨩 𐨀𐨬𐨕𐨪𐨩 𐨨𐨡𐨂𐨭𐨿𐨤𐨯 𐨧𐨀𐨁𐨡𐨟 𐨤𐨂𐨩𐨁𐨟	bhrada Vaga stratego puyaïte Vijayamitro ya Avacaraya maduśpasa Bhaïdata puyita	His brother, Vaga, the general, is honoured, and Vijayamitra, king of the Apraca. His mother's sister Bhaïdata is honoured.
Line 6	𐨀𐨁𐨨𐨅 𐨕 𐨭𐨪𐨁𐨪𐨅 𐨨𐨂𐨪𐨿𐨩𐨐𐨫𐨁𐨞𐨟𐨅 𐨠𐨂𐨦𐨂𐨟𐨅 𐨐𐨁𐨜𐨤𐨜𐨁𐨱𐨪𐨁𐨀 𐨀𐨵𐨁𐨩𐨅 𐨀𐨱𐨅𐨛𐨁 𐨨𐨗𐨁𐨨𐨨𐨁 𐨤𐨿𐨪𐨟𐨁𐨛𐨬𐨞𐨨𐨁 𐨤𐨿𐨪𐨟𐨁𐨛𐨬𐨁𐨯	ime ca śarire muryakaliṇate thubute kiḍapaḍiharia avhiye aheṭhi majimami pratiṭhavaṇami pratiṭhavisa	And these relics from a Maurya period stupa, on which a miracle has been performed, are established in a safe, secure, and central establishment
Line 7	𐨬𐨯𐨁𐨀 𐨤𐨎𐨕𐨀𐨁𐨭𐨆	vasia paṃcaïśo	vasia fifty

The inscription was highly useful in clarifying the little-known Apraca dynasty.

== See also ==
- Cetiya
- Bimaran reliquary
- Kanishka reliquary
- Rukhuna reliquary
- Apracharajas
- Bajaur
