= Apracharajas =

Dynasty of Gandhara (52 BCE–78 CE)

Apracharajas (Gandhari): 𐨀𐨤𐨿𐨪𐨕𐨪𐨗
- 52 BCE–78 CE
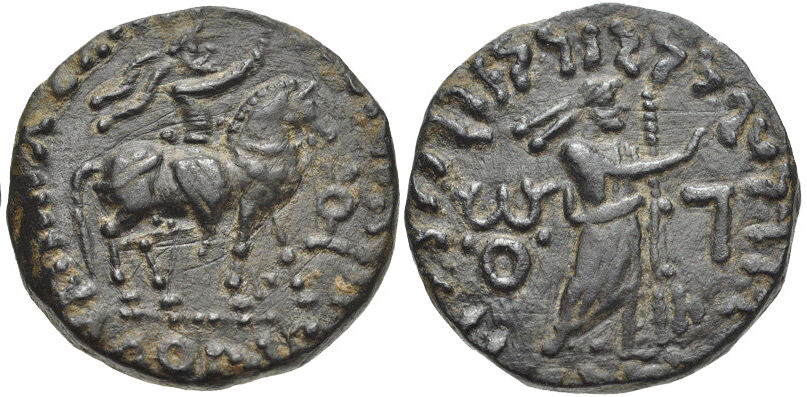
- Silver coin of the Apracharaja Sases

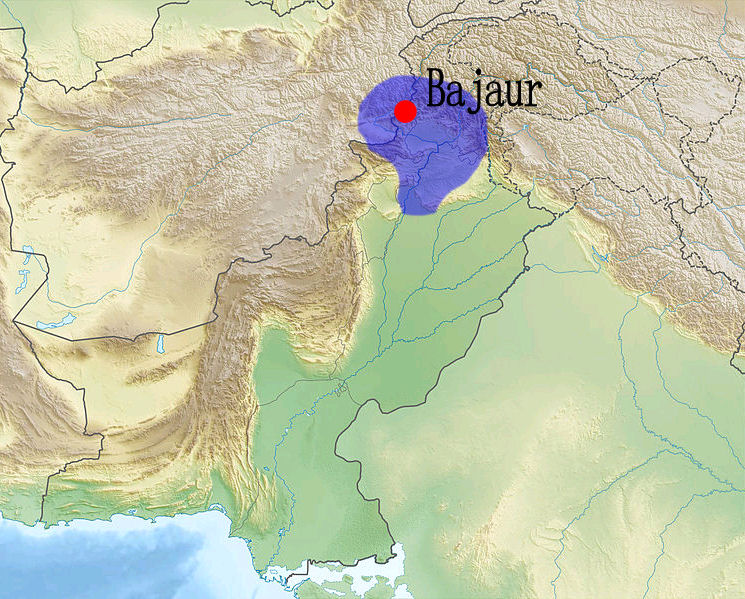
- Approximate location of the Apracharajas.
- Capital: Bajaur
- Common languages: Gandhari Prakrit
- Religion: Gandharan Buddhism
- Government: Monarchy
- Raja
  - c. 52 BCE: Vijayakamitra
  - c. late 1st BCE: Visnuvarma
  - c. 2 BCE: Vijayamitra
  - c. 32 CE: Indravasu
  - c. 50 CE: Indravarma II
  - c. Late 1st Century CE: Sases/Phraotes?
- Historical era: Antiquity
  - Established: 52 BCE
  - Disestablished: 78 CE
- Currency: Tetradrachm

The Apracharajas or Apracarajas (Gandhārī: 𐨀𐨤𐨿𐨪𐨕𐨪𐨗), also known as Avacarajas (Gandhārī: 𐨀𐨬𐨕𐨪𐨗), were a local ruling dynasty of Gandhāra attested mainly in the 1st century BCE and 1st century CE. Their capital, known as Apracapura or Avacapura, was probably located in modern-day Bajaur, though from numismatic evidence and the reliquary inscriptions, it appears that their territory at times encompassed the wider region of Gandhāra. The official language of Apracharajas was Gandhārī, written in the Kharoṣṭhī script. They also adopted the Gandhārī title of gaṃdharaśpami (lit. 'Lord of Gandhāra').

Based on their inscriptions and coinage, the Apracharajas are known to have patronised Buddhism. They constructed stupas and donated reliquaries in honor of the Buddha. The exact genealogical relation of Apracharajas with each other and their origin, however, remains less certain, and reconstruction of it depends on the seventeen Gandhārī language inscriptions associated with them, although some, like Aśpavarma, are mentioned in the Gandhāran Buddhist manuscripts.

Apracharajas were contemporaries of Oḍirājas in Oddiyana, with whom they probably had matrimonial relations.

== Background ==
N. G. Majumdar has suggested the name 'apraca' to be a Gandhārī Prakrit form of Sanskrit 'apratya', literally '(kings) without rival', although H. W. Bailey contested this assertion, stating that it simply meant 'kings of Apraca'. According to Andrea Schlosser, consonant clusters containing y underwent assimilation in Gandhārī language, with dental consonants in such clusters subsequently undergoing palatalization, such as ty > c. It also developed reflex -śp from OIA for Sanskrit -sv, with Sanskrit names such as Aśvavarma appearing as Aśpavarma in the language.

Richard Salomon has argued the Apracharajas to be of Indo-Scythian descent as several women of the dynasty have names of Iranian origin. Several other members of the dynasty also have names of Greek or uncertain origin, while the majority of the Apracas have Indic Gandhārī names. A number of other scholars consider the dynasty to be of local origin from Gandhāra, with Luca M. Oliveiri arguing against the hypothesis of Saka or foreign origin of the dynasty.

Apracharajas issued their own dynastic era, and adopted the ancient Greek title of stratega. With the rise of Indo-Parthians, they aligned with them. They are also suggested to have descended from Aśvakas, an ancient people from Gandhāra known to have fought against Alexander the Great.

== History ==
The Apracharajas were mainly based in Gandhara, with their period extending from rule of Menander II to the era of the early Kushans. They were known for supporting Buddhism.

The dynasty appears to have been founded by Vijayakamitra, a vassal to Menander II according to the Shinkot casket. The Shinkot casket inscription further states that Vijayamitra, a descendant of Vijayakamitra, around half a century after the initial inscription, restored it after it was damaged. He is presumed to have gained the throne in c. 2 BCE after succeeding Visnuvarma, with a reign of three decades lasting til c. 32 CE, before being succeeded by his son Indravasu and then by Indravasu's grandson Indravarma II in c. 50 CE.

Some Apracharajas are documented in the Silver Reliquary (discovered at Sirkap, near Taxila) to have used the title of stratega, a Greek title denoting a position equivalent to senapati, such as Indravarma who was initially a general during the reign of the Vijayamitra. Indravarma is additionally noted for receiving the Silver Reliquary from the Indo-Scythian monarch Kharahostes, which he subsequently rededicated as a Buddhist reliquary. In another reliquary inscription, Indravarma is noted as the Lord of Gandhara. According to Apracha chronology, Indravarma was the son of Visnuvarma, the Apracharaja preceding Vijayamitra.

Indravarma's son Aspavarma ruled between 20 and 50 CE; based on numismatic evidence, his tenure overlapped with that of Indo-Scythian ruler Azes II and the Indo-Parthian ruler Gondophares. According to a Buddhist Avadana, Aspavarma and a Saka noble, Jhadamitra, discussed the establishment of accommodation for monks during the rainy seasons. A reliquary inscription dedicated in 50 CE by a woman named Ariasrava describes that her donation was made during the reign of Gondophares' nephew, Abdagases I, and Aspavarma.

In an inscription dated to 30 CE, Satruleka, identified as a maternal nephew of Vijayamitra, describes himself as a Satrap. This coincides with the invasion of the Indo-Parthians, suggesting that he was appointed as Satrap in an alliance with Gondophares.

During the period of the Indo-Parthians, Sases, a nephew of Aspavarma, gained significant power. Aspavarma, a preceding Apracharaja contemporaneous with Gondophares, was succeeded by Sases, and his coinage shows that he assumed an independent position following Abdagases I. The Kushan ruler Vima Takto is known to have over struck the coins of Sases, whilst in a hoard the coins of Sases were found together with that of Kujula Kadphises. In turn, Sases also over struck the coins of Nahapana of the Western Satraps, whose rule is dated between 40 and 78 CE.

== Apracha reliquary inscriptions ==
In the seventy-seventh year of the Great King Azes, deceased, on the twenty-fourth 24 day of the month Śrāvaṇa, by Śatruleka, Satrap, son of Subhutikă, and maternal nephew to the Apracarāja, relics of the Fortunate One Śākyamuni were established at a previously unestablished location in the village Aṭhayi, for the acceptance of the Kāśyapīya monks. All Buddhas are worshipped, all Pratyekabuddhas, Noble Ones, and Disciples are worshipped, [and] all worthy of worship are worshipped. These relics were established along with [his] wife Davili, [their] sons Indraseṇa and Menandra. And [his] mother and father are worshipped, [his] brother Indraseṇa, the Lord Vijayamitra Apracarāja, and Indravarma the General, Ruler of Gandhāra, are worshipped, Rukhuṇaka, one who has a living son, and all worthy of worship are worshipped. Patrulaśiśara bathes the relics.

— Satruleka, Nephew of Vijayamitra

In the twenty-seventh year in the ruler of Lord Vijayamitra the Apracarāja, in the seventy-third year of the one called Azes, in the two-hundred-and-first 201 year of the Greeks, on the eighth day of the month Śrāvaṇa. On this day a stupa was established by Rukhuṇā, wife of the Apracarāja, along with Vijayamitra the Apracarāja, Indravarma the General, and their wives and princes.

— Bajaur reliquary inscription, Rukhana

The bowl was established by Vijayamitra These relics became broken, are not honoured and so have perished over time; neither śrāddha nor food and water are brought for the ancestors, and so the bowl is not fully covered. In the fifth year of Viyakamitra the Apracarāja on the 25th day of the month Vaiśākha this relic of the Fortunate One, Śākyamuni, the Perfectly Awakened One, was dedicated by Vijayamitra the Apracarāja.

— Shinkot casket, Vijayamitra

In the sixty-third 63 year of the Great King Azes who has passed, on the 16th day of the month Kārttika at this moment of citra, Prince Indravarma, son of the Apracarāja[Viṣ̄uvarma] establishes this relic of the Fortunate One Śākyamuni at a permanent, deep, previously unestablished location. He produces Brahmā-merit along with [his] mother Rukhuṇaka, the one who has a living son and wife of the Apracarāja, along with [his] maternal uncle Ramaka, along with [his] maternal uncle's wife Daṣakā, along with his wives who are sisters, Vasavadata, Mahaveda, and Ṇika, and wife Utara. For the worship of [his] father Viṣ̄uvarma, the Apracarāja. [His] brother Vaga the General, is worshipped as well as Vijayamitra the [current] Apracarāja. His maternal aunt Bhaïdata is worshipped. And having taken these relics from a Mauryan Period stupa they were established in a central location that is without danger, without trouble. vasia fifty.

— Prince Indravarma, son of Visnuvarma

Utarā, wife of the General, establishes a stupa at a previously unestablished location in the region of Tramaṇa. All Buddhas are worshipped, all past and future Pratyekabuddhas are worshipped, [and] all Nobles Ones are worshipped.

— Utara, wife of Indravarma

All Buddhas are worshipped, all past, future, and present Pratyekabuddhas are worshipped, all Noble Ones are worshipped. Utara, the wife of the prince, establishes relics of the Fortunate One along with Prince Indravarma [I]. A stone pillar was erected…Sadaḍha, Ujiṃda… Utaraüta, Pupidrio, [and] Uṣaṃveo are worshipped, the mother of the regional governor Śreṭha is worshipped, [her] father-in-law, Viṣ̄nuvarma the Apracarāja is worshipped, the one who has a living son, Rukhuṇaka is worshipped, General Vaga is worshipped, the Apracarāja Vijayamitra is worshipped, Dhramasena, the monk and overseer of new constructions are worshipped.

— Utara, wife of Indravarma

Prince Indragivarma, son of Apracarāja Vijayamitra, establishes relics in Śpadi at a previously unestablished location for the worship of all Buddhas.

— Indragivarma, second son of Vijayamitra

Of the son of the great satrap, the yagu king, Kharahostes, 28 staters, 4 dhānaka, 2 māṣa Of prince Indravarma, 28 staters, 1 drachm Of prince Indravarma, 43 staters The son of the general Viśpavarma, the prince Indravarma, with his wife, here these relics establishes in his personal stupa. General Viśpavarma and Śiśireṇa, the general's wife, are honoured. Indravasu, king of Apraca, and Vasumitra, who has a living son, are honoured. General Indravarma and Utara, the wife of the general, are honoured. Vijayamitra, the Avaca king, together with his wife, is honoured. The community of all relatives is honoured. All beings are honoured. All beings are brought to nirvana.The son of the general Vispavarma, the prince Indravarma, together with his wife, here these relics establishes in his personal stupa. The general Vispavarma and Śiśireṇa, the wife of the general, are honoured. Indravasu the Apaca king, and Vasumitra, who has a living son, are honoured. General Indravarma is honoured. Utara, the wife of the general, is honoured. Vijayamitra, king of Avaca, together with his wife, is honoured. The community of all beings is honoured and all beings are honoured. All beings are brought to nirvana.

— Silver reliquary inscription, Prince Indravarma II

[Inside of Bowl] In the ninety-eighth 98 year of the Great King, the Great Azes, on the fifteenth 15 day of the month Caitra. In the reign of Gondophares’ nephew Avakaśa. In the reign of General Aśpavarma, son of Indravarma

— Ariasrava

== Patronage of Buddhism ==
The Apracharajas embraced Buddhism: they are known for their numerous Buddhist dedications on reliquaries. On their coins Hellenic designs, derived from the coinage of the Indo-Greeks, continued to appear alongside Buddhist ones.

- Vijayamitra (ruled 12 BCE – 15 CE) personally dedicated in his name a Buddhist reliquary, the Shinkot casket. Some of his coins bear the Buddhist triratna symbol.
- Indravarman, while still a Prince, personally dedicated in 5–6 CE a Buddhist reliquary, the Bajaur casket, now in the Metropolitan Museum of Art.

Numerous Buddhist dedications were made by the rulers of the Apracas:

"Members of the Apraca family in the northwestern borderlands of Pakistan and Afghanistan made numerous Buddhist donations recorded in Kharosṭḥī inscriptions dated in the era of Azes. Although most of these inscriptions lack specific provenance, the domain of the Aparacas was probably centered in Bajaur and extended to Swat, Gandhāra, Taxila, and parts of eastern Afghanistan in the last half of the first century BCE and the early decades of the first century CE. Since the discovery of an inscribed reliquary casket from Shinkot in Bajaur donated by the Apraca king Vijayamitra (who evidently founded the dynasty), other inscriptions record donations of relics by at least four generations of kings, queens, and court officials. Apraca kings known from Kharosṭḥī inscriptions, coins, and seals included Indravasu, Visṇuvarman (perhaps identical to Viśpavarman), and Indravarman, but the dynastic genealogy remains uncertain."

— Neelis, Jason, Early Buddhist Transmission and Trade Networks: Mobility and Exchange.

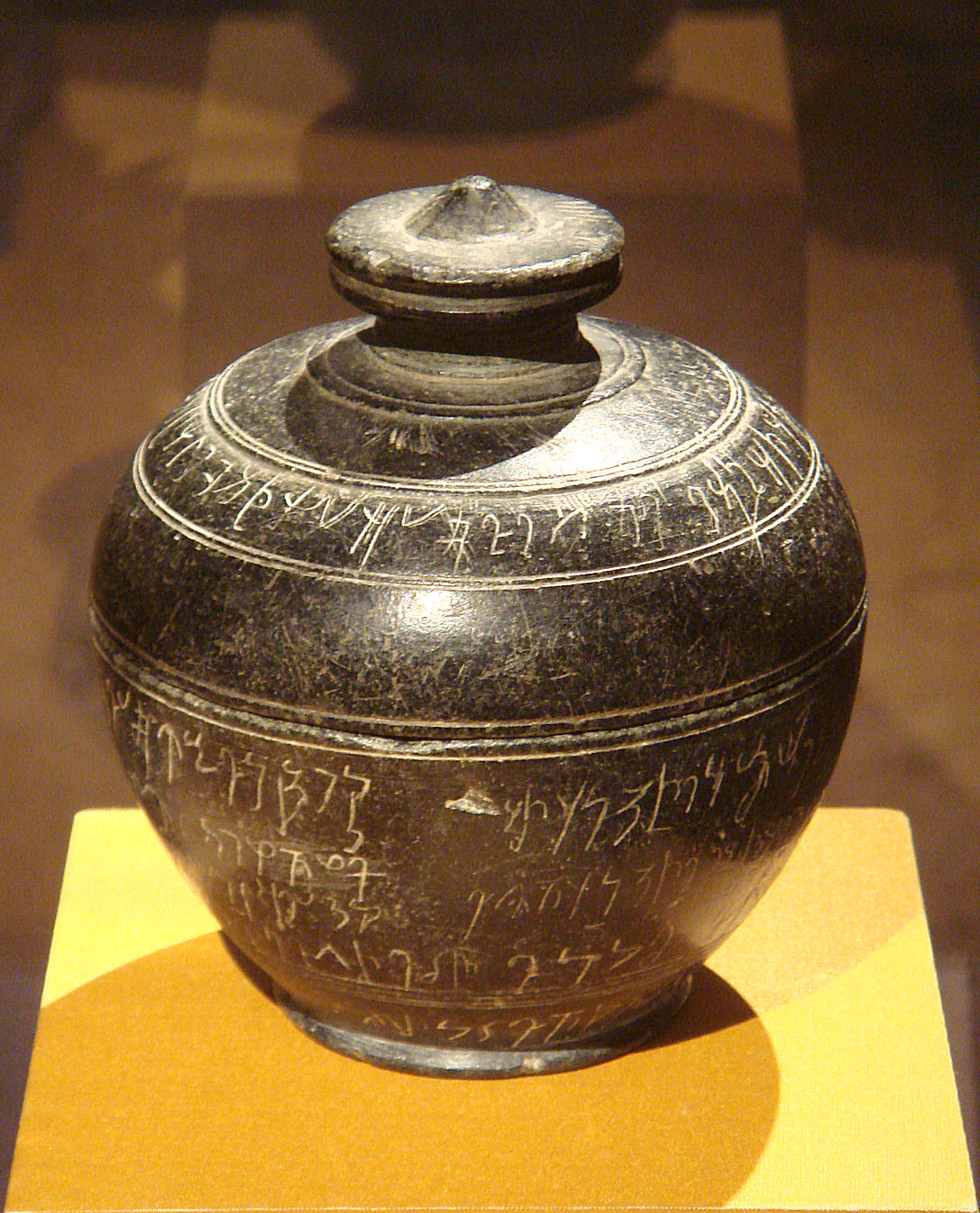
The Bajaur casket was a Buddhist dedication made by Apraca king Indravarman. Metropolitan Museum of Art.

== Genealogy ==
=== Significant Aprachas ===
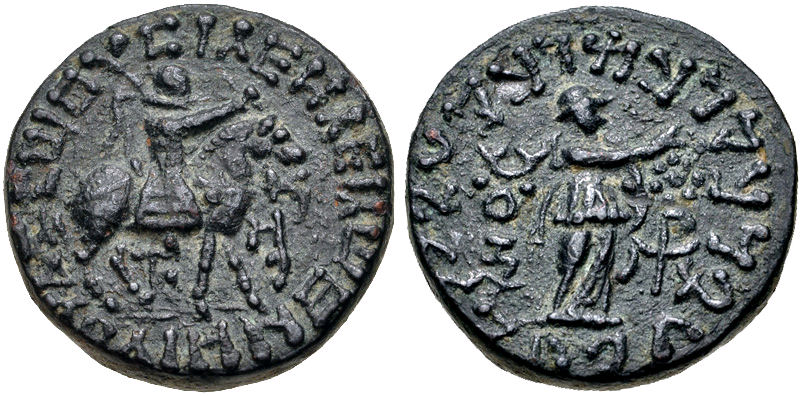
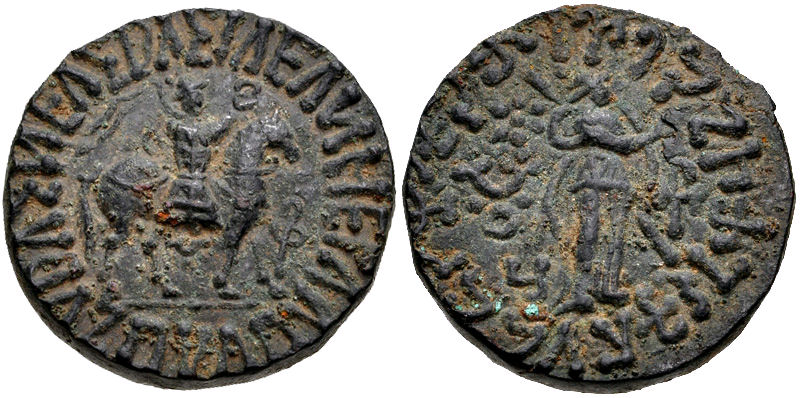
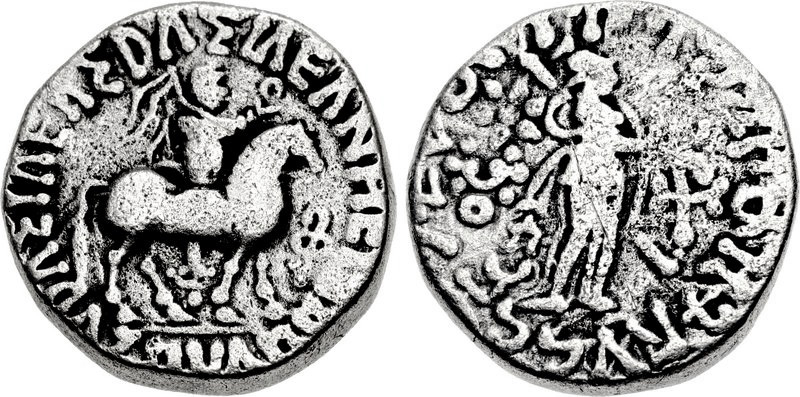
Ruler	Image	Filiation	Approx. dates	Mentions
Visnuvarma			c. Late 1st CE	Queen: Rukhana
Vijayamitra	Apracharajas Vijayamitra		2 BCE – 32 CE	Queen: Prahodi
Indravasu		Son of Vijayamitra	c. 20 CE	Queen: Vasumitra
Indragivarma		Son of Vijayamitra
Satruleka		Maternal nephew of Vijayamitra and son of Subhutika	c. 30 CE	Queen: Davili
Vispavarma		Son of Indravasu		Queen: Śiśirena
Indravarman		Son of Visnuvarma		Queen: Utara
Aspo or Aspavarmo	Apracharajas. Aspavarama. Circa AD 20-46	Son of Indravarma	15 – 45 CE
Sasan				Contemporary of Kujula Kadphises and Mujatria.

=== Family tree ===
Apracharajas

Vijayamitra^{(1)} r. c. 1st Century
Indravasu^{(2)} r. c. 1st Century
Vispavarma^{(3)} r. c. 1st Century
Indravarma^{(4)} r. c. 1st Century
Aspavarma^{(5)} r. c. 1st Century	Child of Indravarma
Sasa^{(6)} r. c. 1st Century

== See also ==
- Indo-Scythian Kingdom
- Indo-Parthian Kingdom
