= Vispavarma =

- Apracha King (Gāndhārī: Apacaraja)
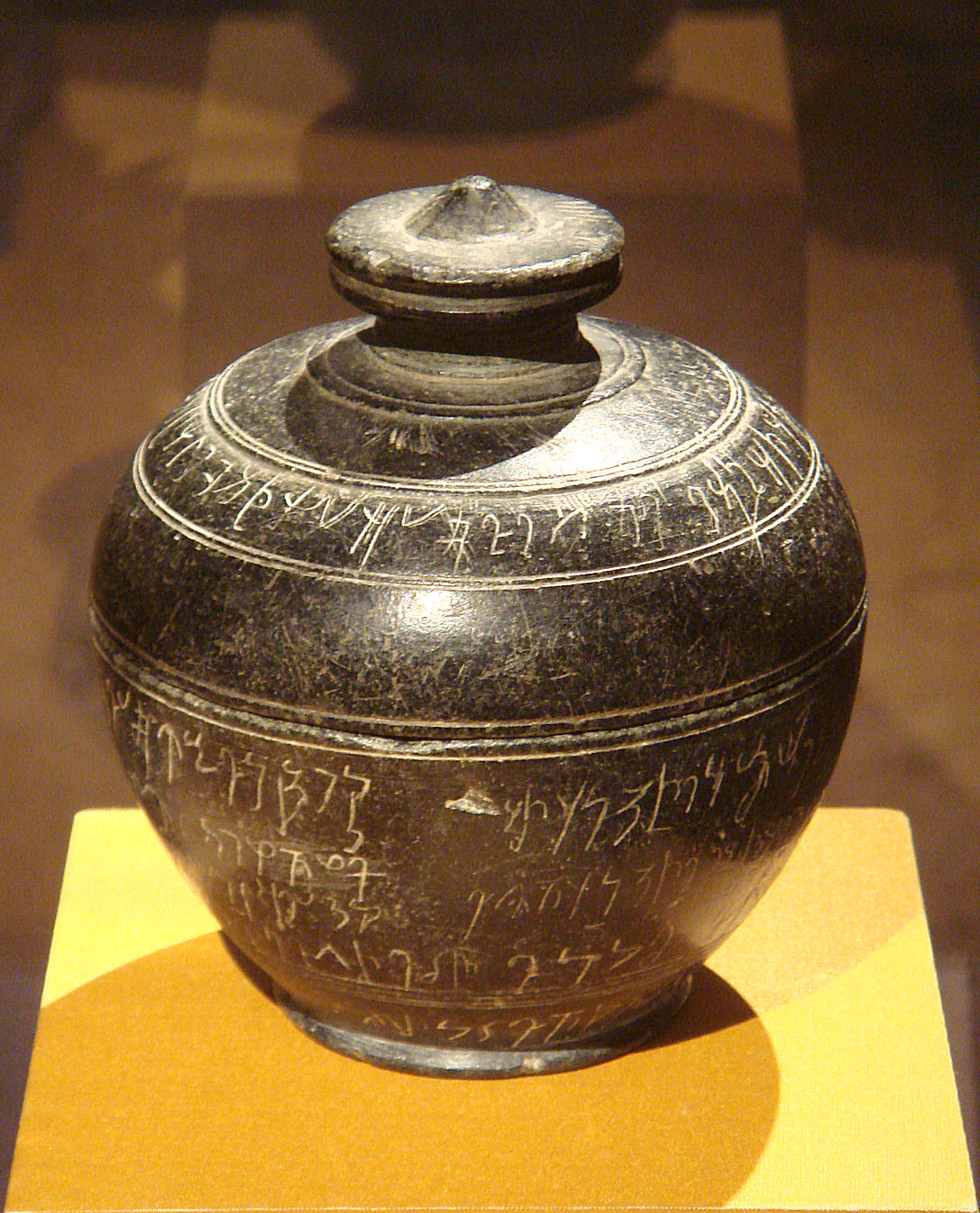
- The Bajaur casket mentions the father of Indravarma, i.e. Vispavarma, as the king of the Aprachas. Metropolitan Museum of Art.
- Predecessor: Indravasu
- Successor: Indravarma
- Spouses: Śiśireṇa
- Issue: Indravarma; Vāsavadattā; Mahāvedā; Ṇikā
- Dynasty: Apracharajas
- Father: Indravasu
- Religion: Buddhism

Vispavarma (Kharosthi: 𐨬𐨁𐨭𐨿𐨤𐨬𐨪𐨿𐨨) was an Apracha general who ruled in Gandhara. He is described on multiple reliquary inscriptions bearing the title 'Stratega' or general, equivalent to that of Senapati and was the son of the Apracharaja, Indravasu.

Vispavarma is mainly known from a dedicatory Buddhist inscription by his son Indravarma, who mentions him as his father. The inscription which is written in Kharoshthi, translates into English as:

Prince Indravarma, son of Commander Vispavarma, together with his wife establishes these bodily relics in his own stupa. Commander Vispavarma and Sisirena, the wife of the Commander, are (hereby) honored. Indravasu, king of Apraca, and his wife Vasumitra, who is the mother of a living son, are (hereby) honored

— Opening inscription in Gandhari Prakrit on the Silver Buddhist reliquary of Prince Indravarma.

In the Bajaur casket inscription, Vispavarma is further described as king of the Apracas by his son Indravarma, the date of the dedication being 5-6 CE:

In the sixty third year of the late great king Aya (Azes), on the sixteenth day of the month of Kartia (Kartika), at this auspicious (?) time, Prince Indravarma (Indravarman), son of the king of Apraca, establishes these bodily relics of Lord Sakyamuni; …. He produces brahma-merit together with his mother, Rukhunaka, daughter of Aji…. And these bodily relics having been brought in possession from the Muraka cave stupa, were established in a secure (?), safe, deep (?), depository…

— Text of the Bajaur casket, Metropolitan Museum of Art.

Since the Bajaur casket indicates that Vispavarma was king as of 5-6 CE, his reign is usually dated to around 0-20 CE.

== See also ==
- Reliquary
- Apraca
- Bajaur

== Notes ==
Vispavarma
Regnal titles
Preceded by Indravasu	Apracharaja c. 0-20 CE	Succeeded by Indravarma

Territories/ dates	Western India	Western Pakistan Balochistan	Paropamisadae Arachosia	Bajaur	Gandhara	Western Punjab	Eastern Punjab	Mathura
			INDO-GREEK KINGDOM					
90–85 BCE			Nicias	Menander II		Artemidoros		
90–70 BCE			Hermaeus	Archebius				
85-60 BCE			INDO-SCYTHIAN KINGDOM; Maues					
75–70 BCE			Vonones; Spalahores	Telephos		Apollodotus II		
65–55 BCE			Spalirises; Spalagadames			Hippostratos	Dionysios	
55–35 BCE			Azes I				Zoilos II	
55–35 BCE			Azilises; Azes II				Apollophanes	Indo-Scythian dynasty of the NORTHERN SATRAPS; Hagamasha
25 BCE – 10 CE				Indo-Scythian dynasty of the APRACHARAJAS; Vijayamitra (ruled 12 BCE - 15 CE) (Note: From the dated inscription on the Rukhana reliquary)	Liaka Kusulaka; Patika Kusulaka; Zeionises	Kharahostes (ruled 10 BCE– 10 CE) (Note: An Inscribed Silver Buddhist Reliquary of the Time of King Kharaosta and Prince Indravarman, Richard Salomon, Journal of the American Oriental Society, Vol. 116, No. 3 (Jul. - Sep., 1996), pp. 442); Mujatria	Strato II and Strato III	Hagana
10-20 CE		INDO-PARTHIAN KINGDOM; Gondophares		Indravasu	INDO-PARTHIAN KINGDOM; Gondophares		Rajuvula	
20-30 CE			Ubouzanes; Pakores	Vispavarma (ruled c.0-20 CE) (Note: A Kharosthī Reliquary Inscription of the Time of the Apraca Prince Visnuvarma, by Richard Salomon, South Asian Studies 11 1995, Pages 27-32, Published online: 09 Aug 2010)	Sarpedones		Bhadayasa	Sodasa
30-40 CE			KUSHAN EMPIRE; Kujula Kadphises	Indravarma	Abdagases		...	...
40-45 CE				Aspavarma	Gadana		...	...
45-50 CE				Sasan	Sases		...	...
50-75 CE							...	...
75-100 CE	Indo-Scythian dynasty of the WESTERN SATRAPS; Chastana		Vima Takto				...	...
100-120 CE	Abhiraka		Vima Kadphises				...	...
120 CE	Bhumaka; Nahapana	PARATARAJAS; Yolamira	Kanishka I				Great Satrap Kharapallana and Satrap Vanaspara for Kanishka I	
130-230 CE	Jayadaman; Rudradaman I Damajadasri I Jivadaman; Rudrasimha I Satyadaman; Jivadaman; Rudrasena I	Bagamira; Arjuna; Hvaramira; Mirahvara	Vāsishka (c. 140 – c. 160); Huvishka (c. 160 – c. 190); Vasudeva I (c. 190 – to at least 230)					
230-280 CE	Samghadaman; Damasena; Damajadasri II; Viradaman; Isvaradatta; Yasodaman I Vijayasena; Damajadasri III; Rudrasena II; Visvasimha	Miratakhma; Kozana; Bhimarjuna; Koziya; Datarvharna; Datarvharna	INDO-SASANIANS; Ardashir I, Sassanid king and "Kushanshah" (c. 230 – 250); Peroz I, "Kushanshah" (c. 250 – 265); Hormizd I, "Kushanshah" (c. 265 – 295)			Kanishka II (c. 230 – 240); Vashishka (c. 240 – 250); Kanishka III (c. 250 – 275)		
280-300 CE	Bhratadarman	Datayola II	Hormizd II, "Kushanshah" (c. 295 – 300)			Vasudeva II (c. 275 – 310)		
300-320 CE	Visvasena; Rudrasimha II; Jivadaman		Peroz II, "Kushanshah" (c. 300 – 325)			Vasudeva III; Vasudeva IV; Vasudeva V Chhu (c. 310? – 325)		
320-388 CE	Yasodaman II; Rudradaman II; Rudrasena III; Simhasena; Rudrasena IV		Shapur II Sassanid king and "Kushanshah" (c. 325); Varhran I, Varhran II, Varhran III "Kushanshahs" (c. 325 – 350); Peroz III "Kushanshah" (c. 350 –360); HEPHTHALITE/ HUNAS invasions			Shaka I (c. 325 – 345); Kipunada (c. 345 – 375)		GUPTA EMPIRE; Chandragupta I Samudragupta
388-395 CE	Rudrasimha III		Chandragupta II					
