= Azes era =

Period of early Indian history

Azes era
(47 BCE)
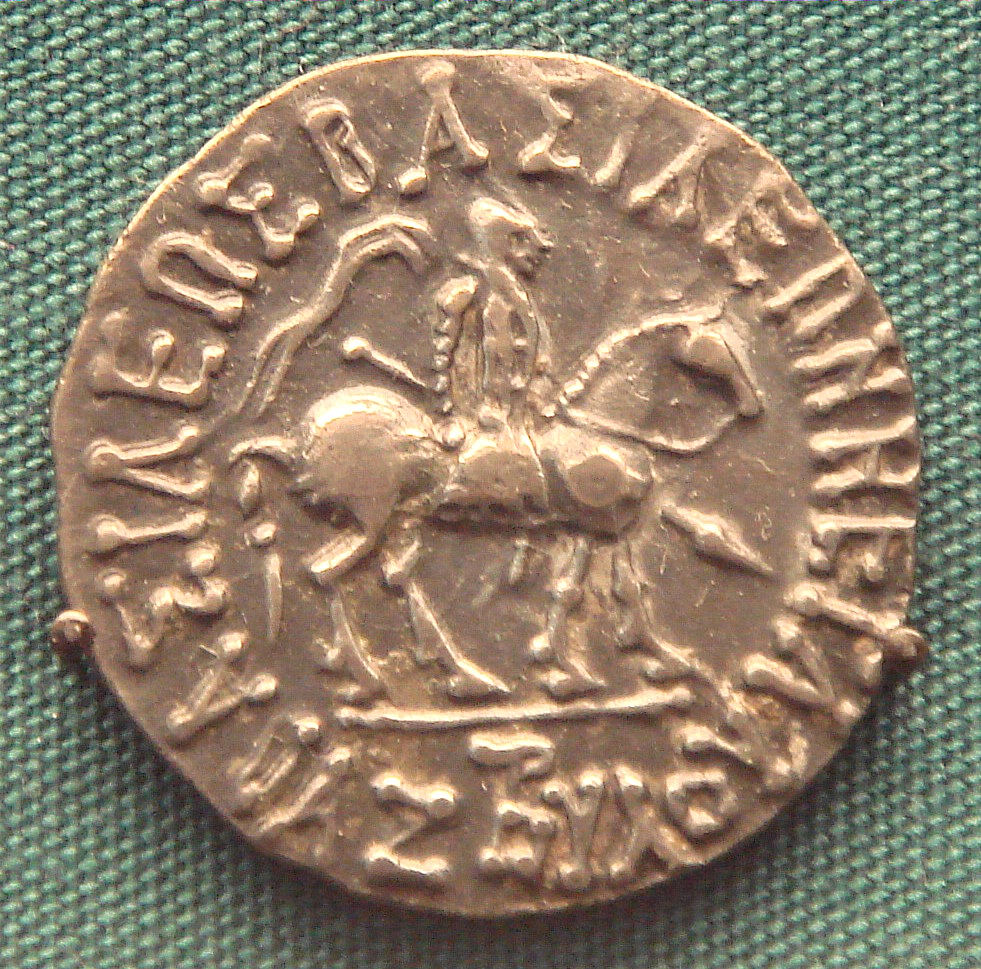
Coin of Azes I (c. 48/47 – 25 BCE).Obv: Azes I in military dress, on a horse, with couched spear. Greek legend: BASILEOS BASILEON MEGALOU AZOU "of the Great King of Kings Azes".

The "Azes era" (also known as the Aja or Ajasa era, Prakrit: Ayasa vaṣaye) starting 47/46 BCE, was named after the Indo-Scythian king, "King Azes the Great" or Azes I. As a number of inscriptions are dated in this era it is of great importance in dating the reigns of several kings and events in early Indian history.

Earlier, some scholars believed that the Azes era was same as the Vikrama Samvat (57 BCE) used in the Indian subcontinent. However, this was disputed by Robert Bracey following discovery of an inscription of Vijayamitra, which is dated in two eras. Research by Falk and Bennett (2009) shows that these two were indeed separate eras, and that the Azes era can be dated with a high degree of likelihood to 47 BCE, or c. 48/47 or 47/46 BCE, depending on whether it began in the spring or the autumn.

It is now thought that the Azes era was probably created by Azes as a continuation of the Arsacid era which started in 247 BCE and marked the foundation of the Parthian Empire, year 1 of Azes corresponding exactly to year 201 of the Arsacid era.

The Azes era was recently connected to the Yavana era thanks to the Rukhana reliquary inscription.
