= Vijayamitra =

Apracha king from 12 BCE to 32 CE

- Apracha King (Gāndhārī: Apacaraja)
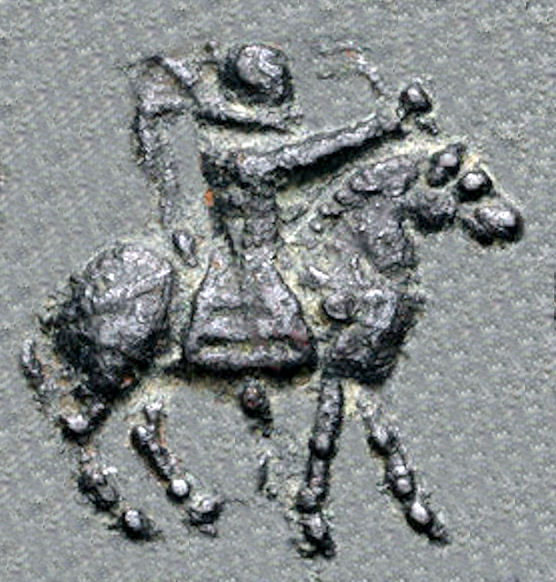
- Vijayamitra riding in armour, holding a whip. Like many other Indo-Scythians, Vijayamitra did not issue portraits.
- Reign: c. 12 BCE - 20 CE
- Successor: Indravasu
- Issue: Indravasu
- Dynasty: Apracharajas
- Religion: Buddhism

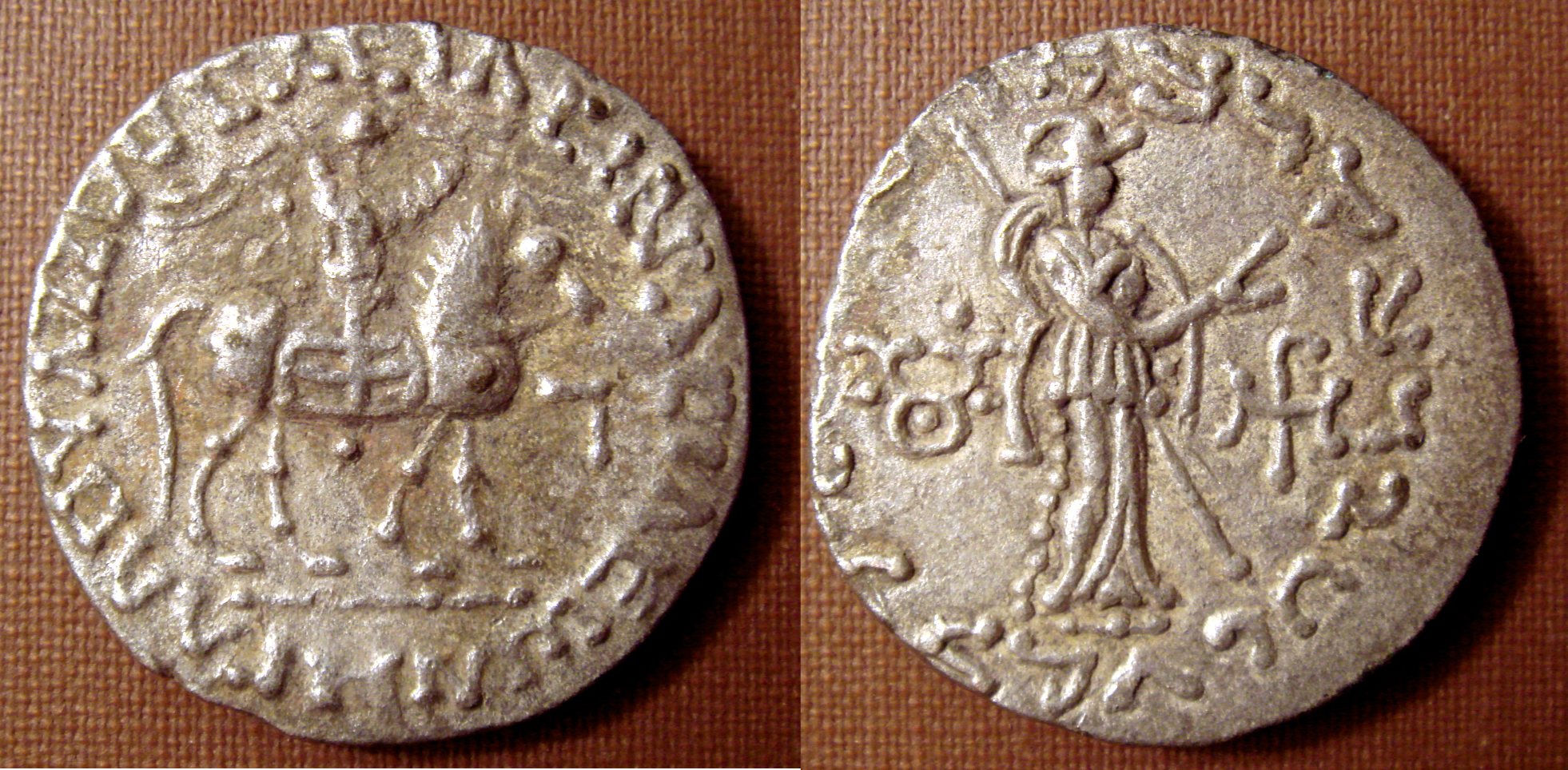
Silver coin of Vijayamitra in the name of Azes. Buddhist triratna symbol in the left field on the reverse.

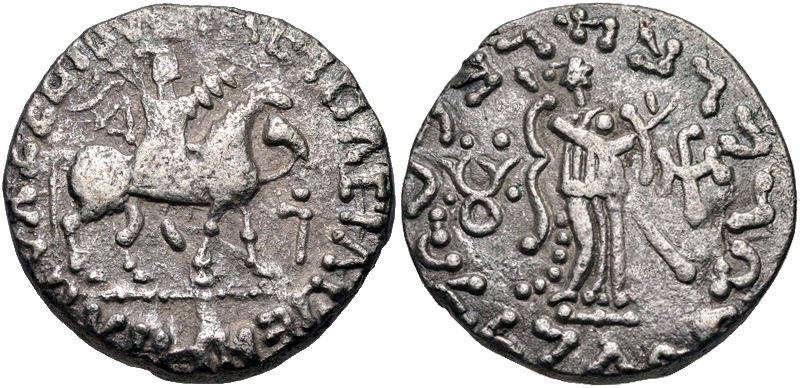
Apracaraja Vijayamitra.

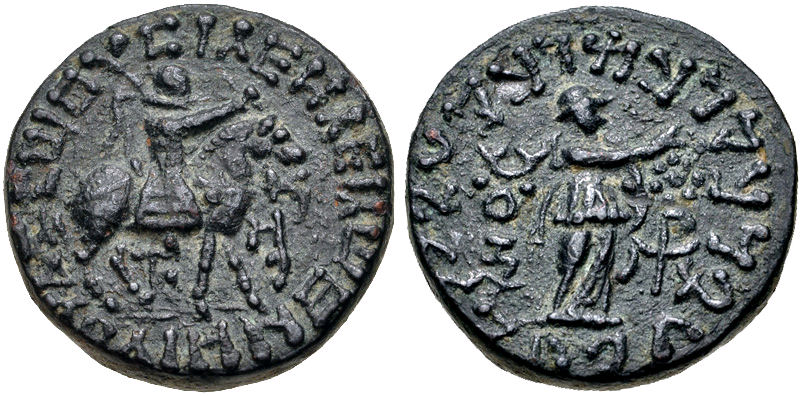
Apracaraja Vijayamitra.

Vijayamitra was an Apracharaja who ruled in Gandhara, with his capital in Bajaur. He succeeded the previous Apracharaja, Visnuvarma, in 3 BCE with a reign lasting til 32 CE.

== Rukhana reliquary ==
Vijayamitra is mentioned in a recently discovered inscription in Kharoshthi on a Buddhist reliquary (the "Rukhana reliquary", published by Salomon in 2005), which gives a relationship between several eras of the period, and especially gives confirmation of a Yavana era in relation to the Azes era:

"In the twenty-seventh - 27 - year in the reign of Lord Vijayamitra, the King of the Apraca; in the seventy-third - 73 - year which is called "of Azes", in the two hundred and first - 201 - year of the Yonas (Greeks), on the eighth day of the month of Sravana; on this day was established [this] stupa by Rukhana, the wife of the King of Apraca, [and] by Vijayamitra, the king of Apraca, [and] by Indravarma (Indravasu?), the commander (stratega), [together] with their wives and sons."

This dedication indicates that King Vijayamitra was a follower of Buddhism. His coins also bear the triratna Buddhist symbol.

Since Vijamitra is said to have ruled 27 years already, as the inscription is dated to 16 CE (Year 73 of the Azes era and 201 of the Yavana era), his reign started in 12 BCE, and ended probably a few years after the dedication took place, around 20 CE.

== Shinkot casket ==
Vijamitra also made a second inscription in the Shinkot casket, which had initially been dedicated under the reign of Indo-Greek king Menander I.

== Notes ==
Vijayamitra
Regnal titles
New title	Apracharaja; 12 BCE – 20 CE	Succeeded by Indravasu

Territories/ dates	Western India	Western Pakistan Balochistan	Paropamisadae Arachosia	Bajaur	Gandhara	Western Punjab	Eastern Punjab	Mathura
			INDO-GREEK KINGDOM					
90–85 BCE			Nicias	Menander II		Artemidoros		
90–70 BCE			Hermaeus	Archebius				
85-60 BCE			INDO-SCYTHIAN KINGDOM; Maues					
75–70 BCE			Vonones; Spalahores	Telephos		Apollodotus II		
65–55 BCE			Spalirises; Spalagadames			Hippostratos	Dionysios	
55–35 BCE			Azes I				Zoilos II	
55–35 BCE			Azilises; Azes II				Apollophanes	Indo-Scythian dynasty of the NORTHERN SATRAPS; Hagamasha
25 BCE – 10 CE				Indo-Scythian dynasty of the APRACHARAJAS; Vijayamitra (ruled 12 BCE - 15 CE) (Note: From the dated inscription on the Rukhana reliquary)	Liaka Kusulaka; Patika Kusulaka; Zeionises	Kharahostes (ruled 10 BCE– 10 CE) (Note: An Inscribed Silver Buddhist Reliquary of the Time of King Kharaosta and Prince Indravarman, Richard Salomon, Journal of the American Oriental Society, Vol. 116, No. 3 (Jul. - Sep., 1996), pp. 442); Mujatria	Strato II and Strato III	Hagana
10-20 CE		INDO-PARTHIAN KINGDOM; Gondophares		Indravasu	INDO-PARTHIAN KINGDOM; Gondophares		Rajuvula	
20-30 CE			Ubouzanes; Pakores	Vispavarma (ruled c.0-20 CE) (Note: A Kharosthī Reliquary Inscription of the Time of the Apraca Prince Visnuvarma, by Richard Salomon, South Asian Studies 11 1995, Pages 27-32, Published online: 09 Aug 2010)	Sarpedones		Bhadayasa	Sodasa
30-40 CE			KUSHAN EMPIRE; Kujula Kadphises	Indravarma	Abdagases		...	...
40-45 CE				Aspavarma	Gadana		...	...
45-50 CE				Sasan	Sases		...	...
50-75 CE							...	...
75-100 CE	Indo-Scythian dynasty of the WESTERN SATRAPS; Chastana		Vima Takto				...	...
100-120 CE	Abhiraka		Vima Kadphises				...	...
120 CE	Bhumaka; Nahapana	PARATARAJAS; Yolamira	Kanishka I				Great Satrap Kharapallana and Satrap Vanaspara for Kanishka I	
130-230 CE	Jayadaman; Rudradaman I Damajadasri I Jivadaman; Rudrasimha I Satyadaman; Jivadaman; Rudrasena I	Bagamira; Arjuna; Hvaramira; Mirahvara	Vāsishka (c. 140 – c. 160); Huvishka (c. 160 – c. 190); Vasudeva I (c. 190 – to at least 230)					
230-280 CE	Samghadaman; Damasena; Damajadasri II; Viradaman; Isvaradatta; Yasodaman I Vijayasena; Damajadasri III; Rudrasena II; Visvasimha	Miratakhma; Kozana; Bhimarjuna; Koziya; Datarvharna; Datarvharna	INDO-SASANIANS; Ardashir I, Sassanid king and "Kushanshah" (c. 230 – 250); Peroz I, "Kushanshah" (c. 250 – 265); Hormizd I, "Kushanshah" (c. 265 – 295)			Kanishka II (c. 230 – 240); Vashishka (c. 240 – 250); Kanishka III (c. 250 – 275)		
280-300 CE	Bhratadarman	Datayola II	Hormizd II, "Kushanshah" (c. 295 – 300)			Vasudeva II (c. 275 – 310)		
300-320 CE	Visvasena; Rudrasimha II; Jivadaman		Peroz II, "Kushanshah" (c. 300 – 325)			Vasudeva III; Vasudeva IV; Vasudeva V Chhu (c. 310? – 325)		
320-388 CE	Yasodaman II; Rudradaman II; Rudrasena III; Simhasena; Rudrasena IV		Shapur II Sassanid king and "Kushanshah" (c. 325); Varhran I, Varhran II, Varhran III "Kushanshahs" (c. 325 – 350); Peroz III "Kushanshah" (c. 350 –360); HEPHTHALITE/ HUNAS invasions			Shaka I (c. 325 – 345); Kipunada (c. 345 – 375)		GUPTA EMPIRE; Chandragupta I Samudragupta
388-395 CE	Rudrasimha III		Chandragupta II					
