= Gandhari language =

Ancient Indo-Aryan language of Gandhāra

Gandhari
- 𐨒𐨌𐨣𐨿𐨢𐨌𐨪𐨁𐨌 (Kharosthi) 𑀕𑀸𑀦𑁆𑀥𑀸𑀭𑀻 (Brahmi)
- Native to: South Asia and Central Asia
- Region: Gandhāra, Khotan and Shanshan
- Era: ca. 300 BCE to 100 CE
- Language family: Indo-European: Indo-Iranian; Indo-Aryan; Dardic; Gandhari
- Writing system: Kharoṣṭhī

Language codes
- ISO 639-3: pgd
- Glottolog: gand1259

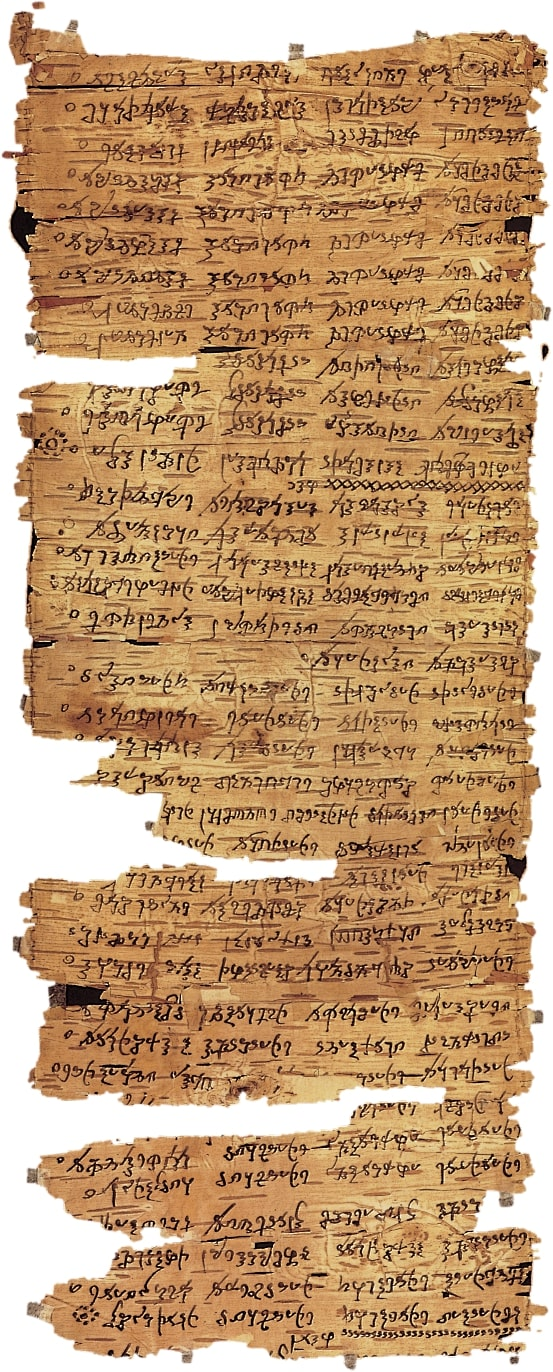
Incomplete birchbark manuscript of the Dhammapada in Gandhari language and Kharoṣṭhī script acquired by the Dutreuil de Rhins mission (1891–1894) in Central Asia. End of the 1st century to 3rd century. Bibliothèque nationale de France

Gandhārī (IPA: [ɡɐn̪d̪ʰaːriː]) was an Indo-Aryan Prakrit language attested mainly in texts dated between the 3rd century BCE and 4th century CE in the region of Gandhāra, in present-day Pakistan and Afghanistan. It appears on coins, inscriptions and texts, notably the Gandhāran Buddhist texts. Gandhārī served as an official language of the Kushan Empire and various central Asian kingdoms, including Khotan and Shanshan. The language was heavily used by the former Buddhist cultures of Central Asia and its inscriptions have been found as far away as Luoyang and Anyang in eastern China.

Gandhārī is notable among the Prakrits for having some archaic phonology, for its relative isolation and independence, for being partially within the influence of the ancient Near East and Mediterranean and for its use of the Kharoṣṭhī script, as opposed to Brahmic scripts used by other Prakrits.

Gandhārī is an early Middle Indo-Aryan language – a Prakrit – with unique features that distinguish it from all other known Prakrits. Phonetically, it maintained all three Old Indo-Aryan sibilants (s, ś, and ṣ) as distinct sounds, whereas they fell together as [s] in other Prakrits – a change that is considered to be one of the earliest Middle Indo-Aryan shifts. The language also preserves certain Old Indo-Aryan consonant clusters, mostly those involving v and r. In addition, intervocalic Old Indo-Aryan th and dh are written, early on, with a special letter (represented by scholars with an underlined s: [s]), which is later used interchangeably with s – suggesting an early sound-change, likely to the voiced dental fricative ð, and then subsequent shifts to z and, finally, a plain s. The Middle Prakrits typically weakened th to dh, which later shifted to h. Kharoṣṭhī does not render the distinction between short and long vowels, so details regarding its handling of this feature are not known.

Gandhārī has been linked with members of the modern Dardic language family, including Shina and Kohistani languages.

== Rediscovery and history ==
Initial identification of a distinct language occurred through study of one of the Buddhist āgamas, the Dīrghāgama, which had been translated into Chinese by Zhu Fonian (Chinese: 竺佛念) based on a text read out by Buddhayaśas (Chinese: 佛陀耶舍).

The now dominant hypothesis on the propagation of Buddhism in Central Asia goes back to 1932 when E. Waldschmidt remarked that the names quoted in the Chinese Dīrghāgama (T. 1), which had been translated by the avowedly Dharmaguptaka monk Buddhayaśas (who also translated the Dharmaguptakavinaya), were not rendered from Sanskrit, but from a then undetermined Prākrit also found in the Khotan Dharmapada. In 1946, Bailey identified this Prākrit, which he named Gandhārī, as corresponding to the language of most Kharoṣṭhī inscriptions from Northwestern India.

Available evidence also indicates that the first Buddhist missions to Khotan were carried out by the Dharmaguptaka sect, and used a Kharoṣṭhī-written Gandhārī. However, there is evidence that other sects and traditions of Buddhism also used Gandhārī, and evidence that the Dharmaguptaka sect also used Sanskrit at times.

It is true that most manuscripts in Gandhārī belong to the Dharmaguptakas, but virtually all schools — inclusive Mahāyāna — used some Gandhārī. Von Hinüber (1982b and 1983) has pointed out incompletely Sanskritised Gandhārī words in works heretofore ascribed to the Sarvāstivādins and drew the conclusion that either the sectarian attribution had to be revised, or the tacit dogma "Gandhārī equals Dharmaguptaka" is wrong. Conversely, Dharmaguptakas also resorted to Sanskrit.

Starting in the first century of the common era, there was a large trend toward a type of Gandhārī which was heavily Sanskritised.

Linguistic evidence links some groups of the Dardic languages with Gandhari. The Kohistani languages, now all being displaced from their original homelands, were once more widespread in the region and most likely descend from the ancient dialects of the region of Gandhara. The last to disappear was Tirahi, still spoken some years ago in a few villages in the vicinity of Jalalabad in eastern Afghanistan, by descendants of migrants expelled from Tirah by the Afridi Pashtuns in the 19th century. Georg Morgenstierne claimed that Tirahi is "probably the remnant of a dialect group extending from Tirah through the Peshawar district into Swat and Dir." Nowadays, it must be entirely extinct and the region is now dominated by Iranian languages brought in by later immigrations, such as Pashto. Among the modern-day Indo-Aryan languages still spoken today, Torwali, another language within the Dardic subgroup, shows the closest linguistic affinity possible to Niya Prakrit, a dialect of Gandhārī once spoken in Niya (now Xinjiang, China).

== Phonology ==
In general terms, Gandhārī is a Middle Prakrit, a term for middle-stage Middle Indo-Aryan languages. It only begins to show the characteristics of the Late Prakrits in the 1st century of the Common Era. The Middle Prakrit phonetic features are the weakening of intervocalic consonants: degemination and voicing, such as the shift of OIA *k to g. The most rapid loss was the dentals, which started to disappear completely even before the late period as with *t > ∅ as in *pitar > piu; in contrast, retroflex consonants were never lost. There is also evidence of the loss of a distinction between aspirates and plain stops as well, which is unusual in the Indo-Aryan languages.

In Central Asian Gandhārī, there is often confusion in writing nasals with homorganic stops; it is unclear if this might represent assimilation of the stop or the appearance of prenasalised consonants to the phonetic inventory.

== Grammar ==
Gandhārī grammar is difficult to analyse; endings were eroded not only by the loss of final consonants and cluster simplification of all Prakrits but also by the apparent weakening of final vowels "'to the point that they were no longer differentiated'". Nonetheless, there was still at least a rudimentary system of grammatical case. Verbal forms are highly restricted in usage due to the primary usage of longer texts to translations of religious documents and the narrative nature of the sutras but seem to parallel changes in other Prakrits.

== Lexicon ==
The lexicon of Gandhārī is also limited by its textual usage; it is still possible to determine unusual forms, such as Gandhārī forms that show commonalities with forms in modern Indo-Aryan languages of the area, notably some groups of the Dardic languages. An example is the word for sister, which is a descendant of Old Indo-Aryan svasṛ- as in the Dardic languages, whereas all the Indo-Aryan languages have replaced that term with reflexes of bhaginī.

== Literature ==
Until 1994, the only Gāndhāri manuscript available to the scholars was a birch bark manuscript of a Buddhist text, the Dharmapāda, discovered at Kohmāri Mazār near Hotan in Xinjiang in 1893 CE. From 1994 on, a large number of fragmentary manuscripts of Buddhist texts, were discovered in eastern Afghanistan and western Pakistan. These include:

- 29 fragments of birch-bark scrolls of British Library collection consisting of parts of the Dharmapada, Anavatapta Gāthā, the Rhinoceros Sūtra, Sangitiparyaya and a collection of sutras from the Ekottara Āgama.
- 129 fragments of palm leaf folios of Schøyen Collection, 27 fragments of palm-leaf folios of Hirayama collection and 18 fragments of palm leaf folios of Hayashidera collection consisting of the Mahāyāna Mahāparinirvāṇa Sūtra and the Bhadrakalpikā Sūtra.
- 24 birch-bark scrolls of Senior collection consists of mostly different sutras and the Anavatapta Gāthā.
- 8 fragments of a single birch-bark scroll and 2 small fragments of another scroll of University of Washington collection consisting of probably an Abhidharma text or other scholastic commentaries.

The current corpus of Gandhārī literature consists of 391 manuscripts (including fragments), 901 administrative documents (mainly discovered from Niya in the kingdom of Shanshan), and 1,234 inscriptions in addition to coin legends.

== Translations from Gāndhāri ==
Mahayana Buddhist Pure Land Sūtras were brought from Gandhāra to China as early as 147 CE, when the Kushan monk Lokakṣema began translating the first Buddhist sutras into Chinese. The earliest of these translations show evidence of having been translated from Gandhārī. It is also known that manuscripts in the Kharoṣṭhī script existed in China during this period.

== See also ==
- Pre-Islamic scripts in Afghanistan
