= Diogenes (disambiguation) =

Diogenes (412–323 BCE) was a Greek philosopher and one of the founders of Cynic philosophy.

Diogenes may also refer to:

== People ==
- Diogenes of Apollonia or Diogenes Apolloniates (c. 460 BCE), philosopher
- Diogenes of Athens (tragedian) (late 5th century or early 4th century BCE), writer of tragedies
- Diogenes (Macedonian commander), Macedonian garrison commander who returned Piraeus to Athens in 229 BCE
- Diogenes of Babylon or "Diogenes the Stoic" (c. 230 – c. 150 BCE ), Stoic philosopher from Seleucia, frequently confused with the following
- Diogenes of Seleucia (died 146 BCE ), Epicurean philosopher and adviser to King Alexander of Syria
- Antonius Diogenes (2nd century CE), Greek romance writer, most notable for his work The Wonders of Thule
- Diogenes of Cappadocia (2nd century BCE),
- Diogenes of Tarsus (2nd century BCE), Epicurean philosopher
- Diogenes of Judea (fl. c. 100–76 BCE), general and advisor of Hasmonean king Alexander Jannaeus
- Diogenes of Athens (sculptor) (late 1st century BCE–early 1st century CE), sculptor who worked in Augustan Rome
- Diogenes (explorer) (1st century CE), Greek merchant and explorer of Mountains of the Moon (Africa)
- Diogenes of Byzantium (114–129 CE), bishop of Byzantium
- Diogenes of Oenoanda (2nd century CE), Epicurean
- Diogenes Laërtius (between 200 and 500 CE), historian and philologist
- Diogenes of Edessa (d. 411/412), Bishop of Edessa
- Constantine Diogenes (died 1032), Byzantine general
- Romanos IV Diogenes (died 1072), Byzantine emperor 1068–1071, son of Constantine Diogenes
- Constantine Diogenes (son of Romanos IV) (died 1073)
- Nikephoros Diogenes (11th century), Byzantine general, son of Romanos IV
- "Diogenes" is also sometimes confused with the name of Digenes Akritas, the hero of a famous Byzantine epic.
- Diogenes, a pen-name used by Max Beerbohm
- Diógenes (footballer, born 1937) (1937–2004), Diogenes José da Silva, Brazilian defender
- Diógenes (footballer, born 2001), Diógenes Vinicius da Silva, Brazilian goalkeeper
- Diógenes Quintero (1989–2026), Colombian lawyer, human rights defender, and politician

== Biology and medicine ==
- Diogenes (crustacean) is a genus of hermit crabs
- Diogenes syndrome, a misnomer for a mental disorder

== Modern literature ==
- Diogenes (British magazine), a British satirical magazine published from 1853 to 1855
- Diogenes (journal) journal published by the International Council for Philosophy and Human Sciences
- Diogenes Verlag, a Swiss publishing house
- Diogenes Club, named after Diogenes of Sinope, co-founded by Sherlock Holmes' brother Mycroft
- Diogenes, an interstellar scout ship in Poul Anderson's The Entity
- Diogenes Small, a character created by Colin Dexter in the Inspector Morse series of books
- Diogenes Pendergast, a character from Douglas Preston and Lincoln Child's Pendergast series of books
- Diogenes Teufelsdröckh, the fictional philosopher of Clothes Philosophy described in Thomas Carlyle's Sartor Resartus

== Other uses ==
- Diogenes Project, original name of the Wizards Project
- Mount Diogenes, another name for Hanging Rock, Victoria, Australia
- Diogenes, the playable character in Getting Over It with Bennett Foddy
- Diógenes (film), a Quechua-language drama film by Leonardo Barbuy La Torre

== See also ==
- Diogenes of Athens (disambiguation)
