= Diogenes of Athens =

Diogenes of Athens may refer to:

- Diogenes of Athens (sculptor), sculptor who worked at Rome during the reign of Augustus
- Diogenes of Athens (tragedian), writer of Greek tragedy in the late 5th or early 4th century BC
