= Swarnadhisvara Siva Temple =

Swarnadhisvara Siva temple
- Location in Orissa

Religion
- Affiliation: Hinduism
- Deity: Siva lingam

Location
- Location: Bhubaneswar
- State: Orissa
- Country: India
- Interactive map of Swarnadhisvara Siva temple
- Coordinates: 20°14′41″N 85°50′09″E

Architecture
- Type: Kalingan Style (Kalinga Architecture)
- Completed: 13th century
- Elevation: 18 m (59 ft)

The Swarnadhisvara Siva temple is located in the northern side of the road leading from Lingaraj Temple to Kedar Gouri, Bhubaneswar, the capital of the state of Orissa, India. The temple faces east. The enshrined deity is a Siva lingam within a circular yoni pitha. The Sanctum measures 1.5 square meters which is 2m below the present ground level. The temple is made of laterite. It is an abandoned and non-living temple. The temple was built in the Late Ganga period in the 13th century.

== Physical description ==
- Surrounding : The temple is surrounded by recent structures including the Sradha mandapa that encroach the entry to the temple.
- Orientation: The temple is facing towards east.
- Architectural features (Plan and Elevation): On plan, the temple has a vimana and a frontal porch that measures 3.5 square m. It is pancharatha plan as distinguished by a central raha and pair of anuratha and kanika pagas on either sides of the raha. On elevation, the bada is the panchanga bada as it is partially buried that measure 2.3 m in height. The baranda with three mouldings measures 0.55 m. The gandi measures 3.0 m in height with a central raha and a pair of anuratha and kanika pagas are either sides of raha. The mastaka measures 1.0 m in height has components like beki, amlaka, khapuri and kalasa.
- Decorative features: The eastern wall of the gandi is relieved with three miniature rekha deula out of which the central one is taller than the other two. Above it is a gajakranta motif of which only the elephant exists. In the northern wall there is a vajra mastaka and above it there is a broken udyota simha. In the southern and northern walls only vajra mastaka exist. The other part of the gandi is plain.

- Door Jambs: The doorjambs are decorated with three plain vertical bands. At the lalatabimba there is a Gajalaxmi image. At the base of the doorjambs above the chandrasila there are dvarapala niches on the either sides surmounted by khakhara mundis. The dvarapalas are heavily weathered and eroded.
- Lintel: The architrave above the doorjamb is carved with the navagrahas each within a niche and seated in padmasana Ravi holding lotus in both hands and Ketu has a serpent tail.

The building material used is Laterite stone. The Construction technique is Dry masonry and the style is Kalingan

== State of preservation ==
The temple is in a dilapidated condition and is showing signs of deterioration due to growth of vegetation, water seepage from the cracks and encroachments from all sides. The temple is buried up to baranda level. It was repaired by the Orissa State Archaeology under the X and XI Finance Commission Award.

== Grade ==
Classification	Grade
Architecture	B
Historic	C
Associational	C
Social/Cultural	C

== Threats to the property ==
The conservation problem is that the rain water is seeping into the sanctum. The temple is covered with lichens, creepers and wild grasses. It is in a dilapidated condition. The monument suffocates because of encroachment. The detached and loose sculptures includes a Ganesha image inside the sanctum standing over a lotus pedestal the deity is holding a parasu in his right hand and the other hands are broken.
