= Anguiped =

Divinity on Greco-Roman amulets

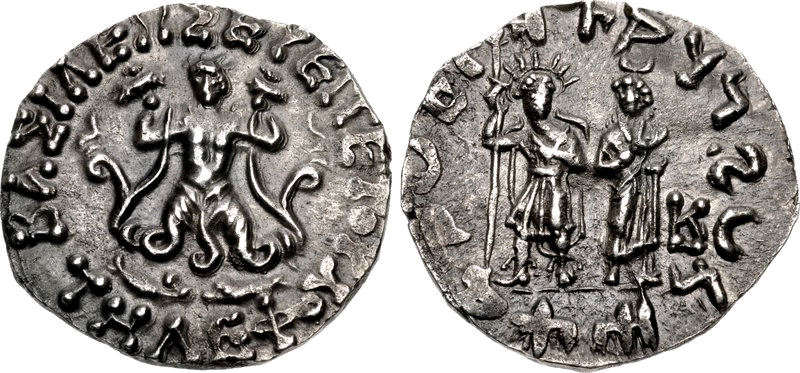
Coin of Indo-Greek king Telephos displaying an anguipede with limbs ending in lotus blossom (obverse).

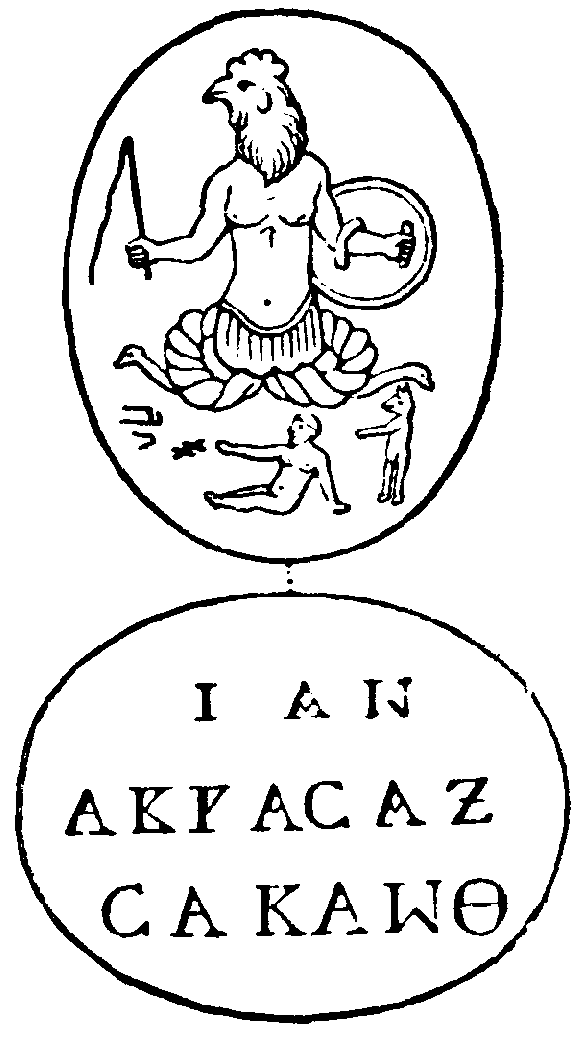
An abraxas stone with one rendering of an anguiped at top.

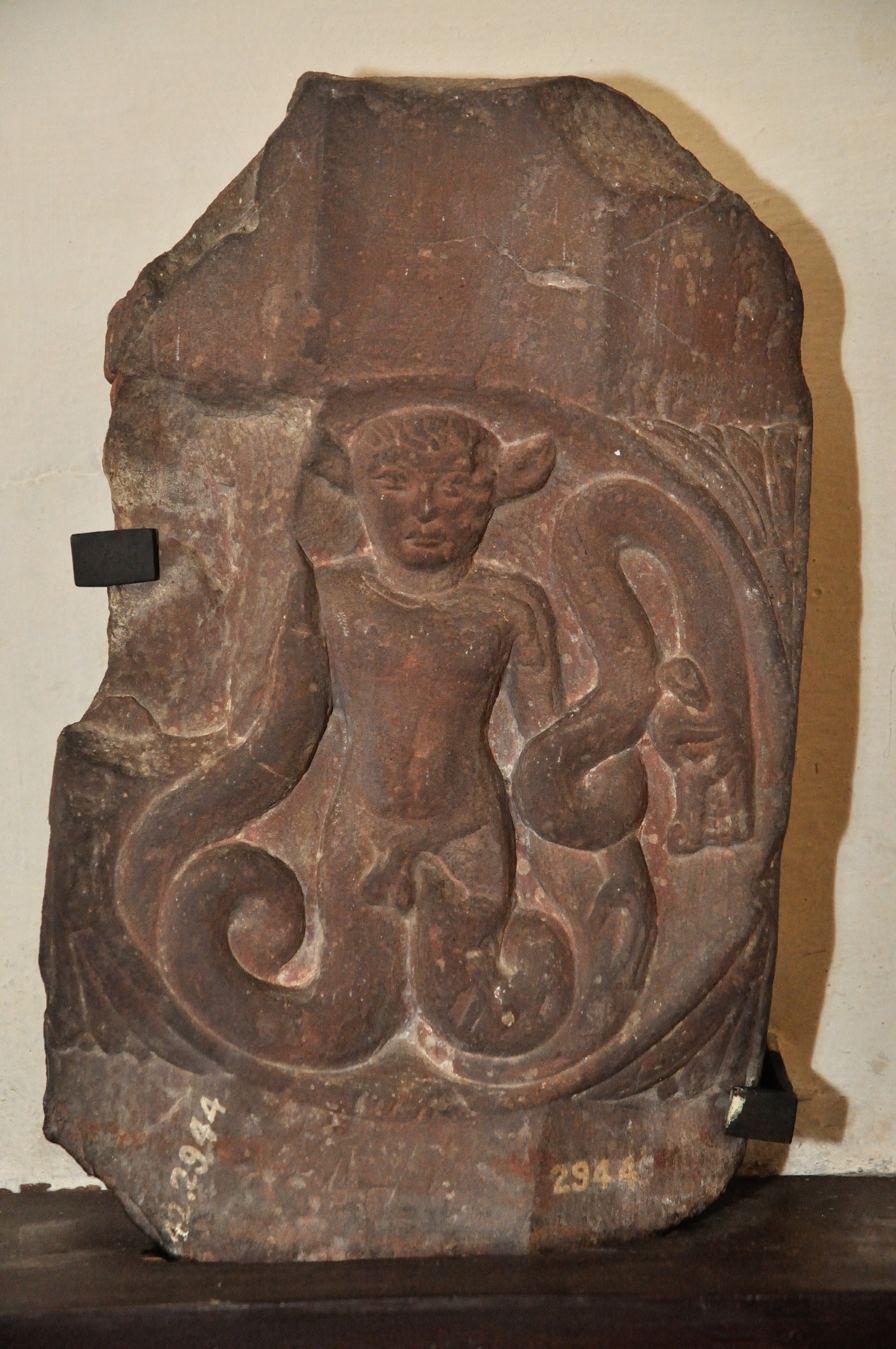
Indian anguiped, a Vyala Yaksha.

The Anguiped (Latin: angui, 'snake'; ped-, 'foot') is a divine property or visual motif that is often found on magical amulets from the Greco-Roman period, characterized by a human figure with serpent tails for legs.

Abraxas, the most common kind of Anguiped, is depicted as a creature with the head of a rooster and snakes for legs, symbolism thought to be of Persian origin. Sometimes inscribed below is Iao, a form of the Tetragrammaton – the four letters used to represent the name of the God of Judaism. Such amulets, as well as the repeated usage of the name Iao in magical papyri, curse tablets, gems, and other amulets, provide evidence of syncretic cults combining elements of Judaism with paganism. In the Talmud, people who turned away from Judaism to such cults are referred to as minim – often translated as "heretics" or "apostates".

In Graeco-Roman art, both Typhon and the giants (after around 380 BCE) are often conventionally depicted as anguipeds. A common religious motif in Roman Germany and eastern Gaul depicts an equestrian Jupiter riding down an anguipedal giant.

== See also ==
- Snake-Legged Goddess
