= Gajalakshmi =

Aspect of Hindu goddess Lakshmi

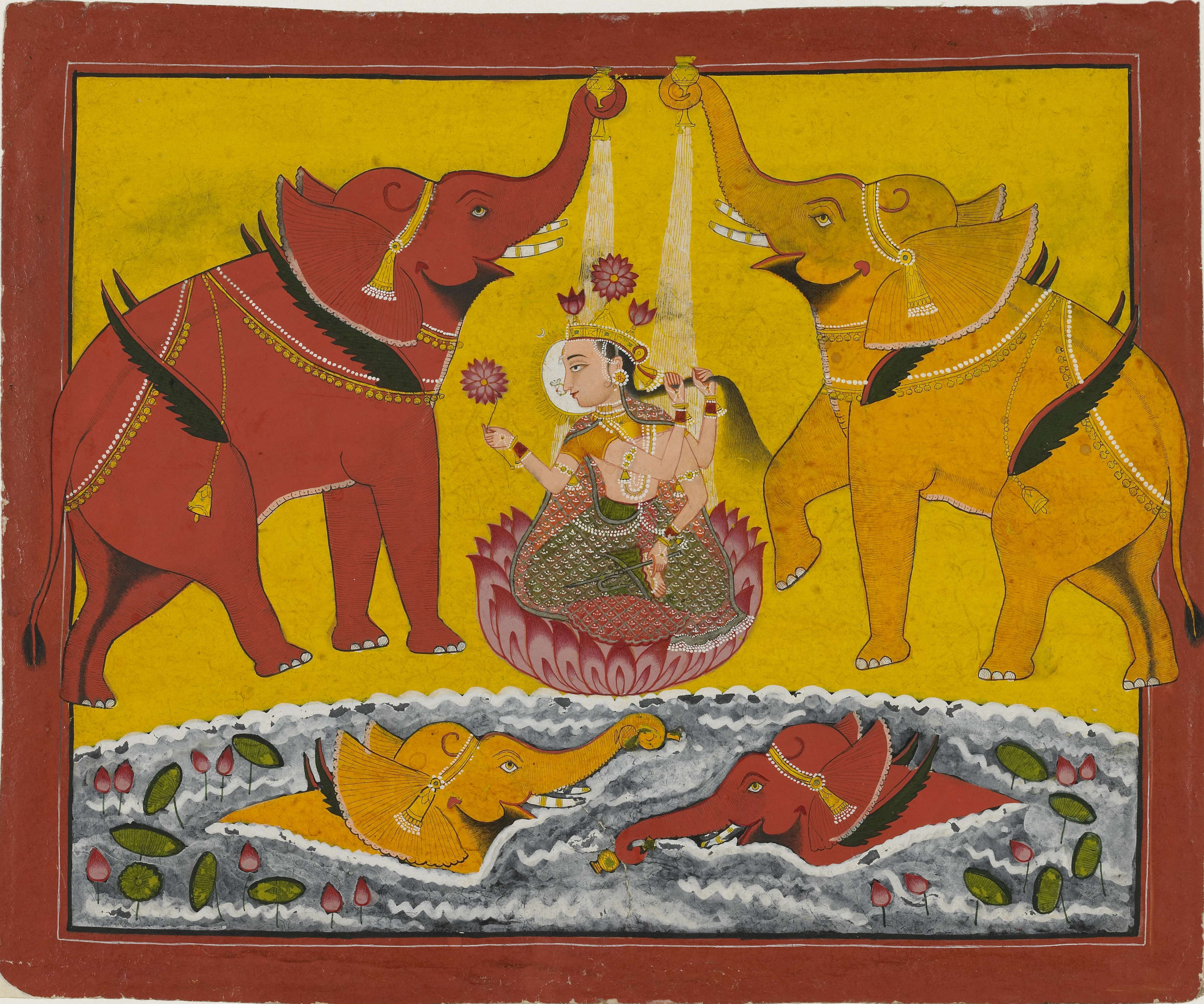
Miniature, c. 1780

Gajalakshmi (Sanskrit: गजलक्ष्मी, romanized: Gajalakṣmī, lit. 'Elephant Lakshmi'), also spelt as Gajalaxmi, is a prominent representation of the goddess Lakshmi, the Hindu deity of wealth, prosperity, and fertility, depicted with two elephants on either side. This representation symbolises not only the divine blessings of wealth and prosperity but also embodies themes of fertility and royal authority.

This form has been incorporated as one of the Ashta Lakshmi, the eight aspects of Lakshmi representing different aspects of wealth.

== Iconography and symbolism ==
In Hindu mythology, Gajalakshmi is regarded to have restored the wealth and power lost by Indra when she rose from the Samudra Manthana, the churning of the ocean. She is portrayed with four arms, adorned in red attire, holding lotuses in two hands, while the other hands display the abhaya mudra and varada mudra. She is flanked by two elephants. In typical representations of Gaja Lakshmi, the elephants are shown showering the goddess with water from their trunks or from pots. This act of pouring water is emblematic of the nurturing rains that are vital for agricultural prosperity and the sustenance of life. The elephants in this imagery possess significant symbolic meaning.

The elephants are often interpreted as symbols of fertilising rains, drawing from an ancient Hindu belief that associates them with clouds. Mythological narratives suggest that the original elephants had wings and traversed the skies, bestowing rain upon the earth. Cursed to remain earthbound after interrupting a sage's meditation, they retained a connection to the clouds, symbolising the nurturing power of rain essential for the growth of crops. Thus, the presence of elephants in conjunction with Lakshmi reinforces her role as a provider of fertility and abundance.

Elephants have historically been associated with royalty in India, serving as symbols of power and majesty. Kings maintained stables of elephants for both ceremonial and military purposes, as they were integral to royal processions and were believed to influence rainfall and agricultural fertility. Consequently, the depiction of elephants alongside Lakshmi highlights the intertwining of wealth and sovereignty, merging the attributes of the goddess with those of royal power.

Additionally, she is the form of the goddess who stands for animal wealth, as well as other symbols of wealth that represent strength.

== Depictions ==
In a sixth century CE sculpture, the goddess is depicted holding a lotus in her left hand and a lotus cornucopia in her right hand. There are two lions at her feet, two elephants bathing her with life giving waters, and two female attendants to her left and right side holding flywhisks.

An image is found from the 2nd century BCE, possibly in Buddhist contexts, and appears on the railings from the Buddhist site of Bharhut, from 125–100 BCE. It appears on a 1st-century BCE coin of Azilises, and a 3rd-century CE coin from Kausambi.

A depiction of Gajalakshmi seated on a lotus is found in Cave 14 at Ellora.

Temples in Odisha in the classic local Kalinga architecture style very often have a figure of Gajalakshmi in lalitasana as their lalatabimba or central protective image over the doorway to a temple or the sanctuary. One of the tympana at the Temple of Bantãy Srĕi in Siem Reap, Cambodia, has a beautifully sculptured image of the Goddess Gajalakshmi in pink sandstone. Though over a thousand years old, this tympanum is in almost as good a state as it must have been when created.

Gajalakshmi is worshipped in many places in Goa and Konkan as a fertility goddess, mostly under the names Gajantlakshmi, Gajalakshmi, Kelbai or Bhauka devi, by various Konkani communities as their tutelary deity.

According to Timothy Taylor, there might be a connection between the female deity with elephants portrayed on the Gundestrup cauldron and Gajalakshmi.

== Gallery ==
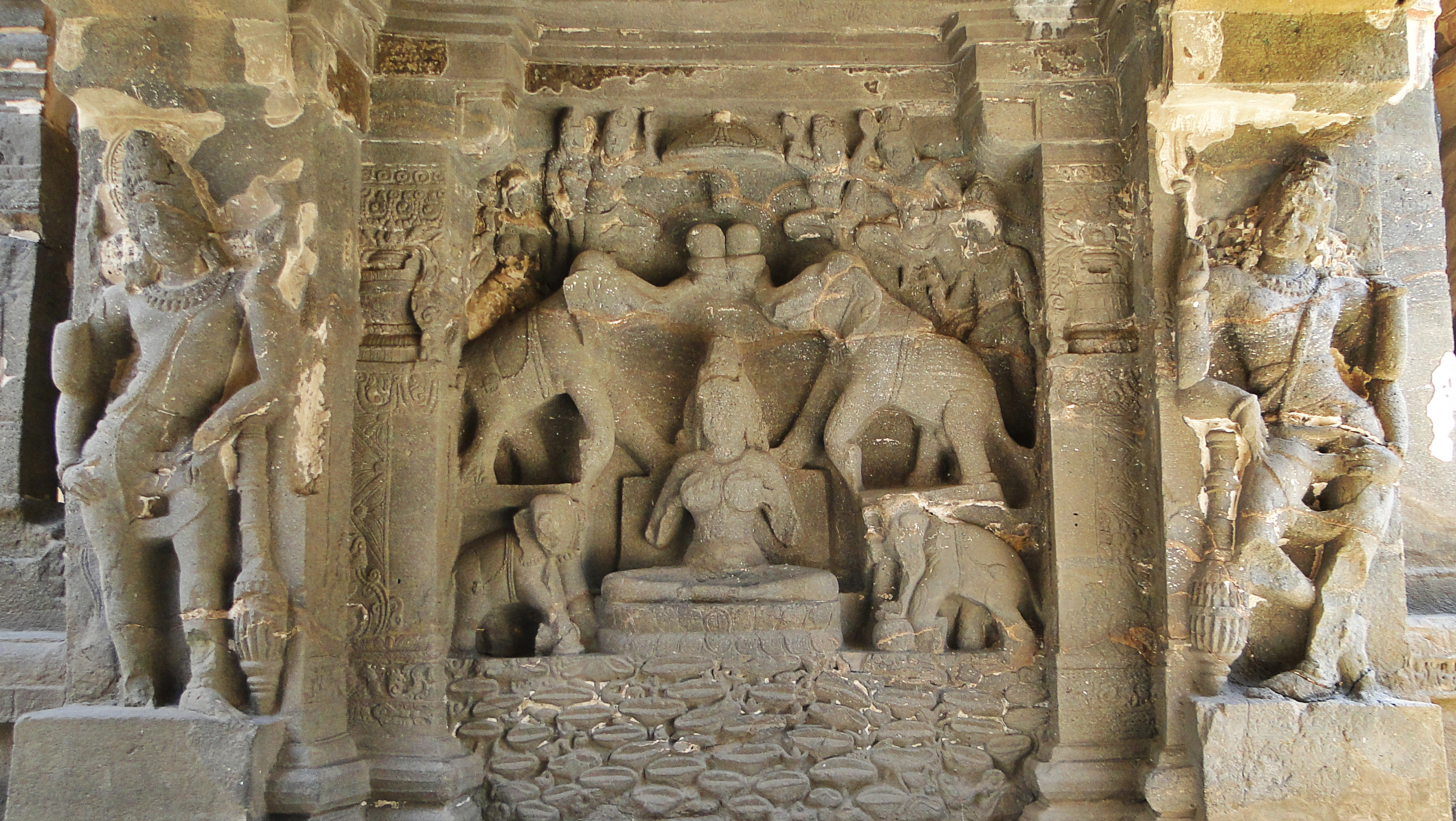
Cave 16 (Kailasa Temple), Ellora Caves

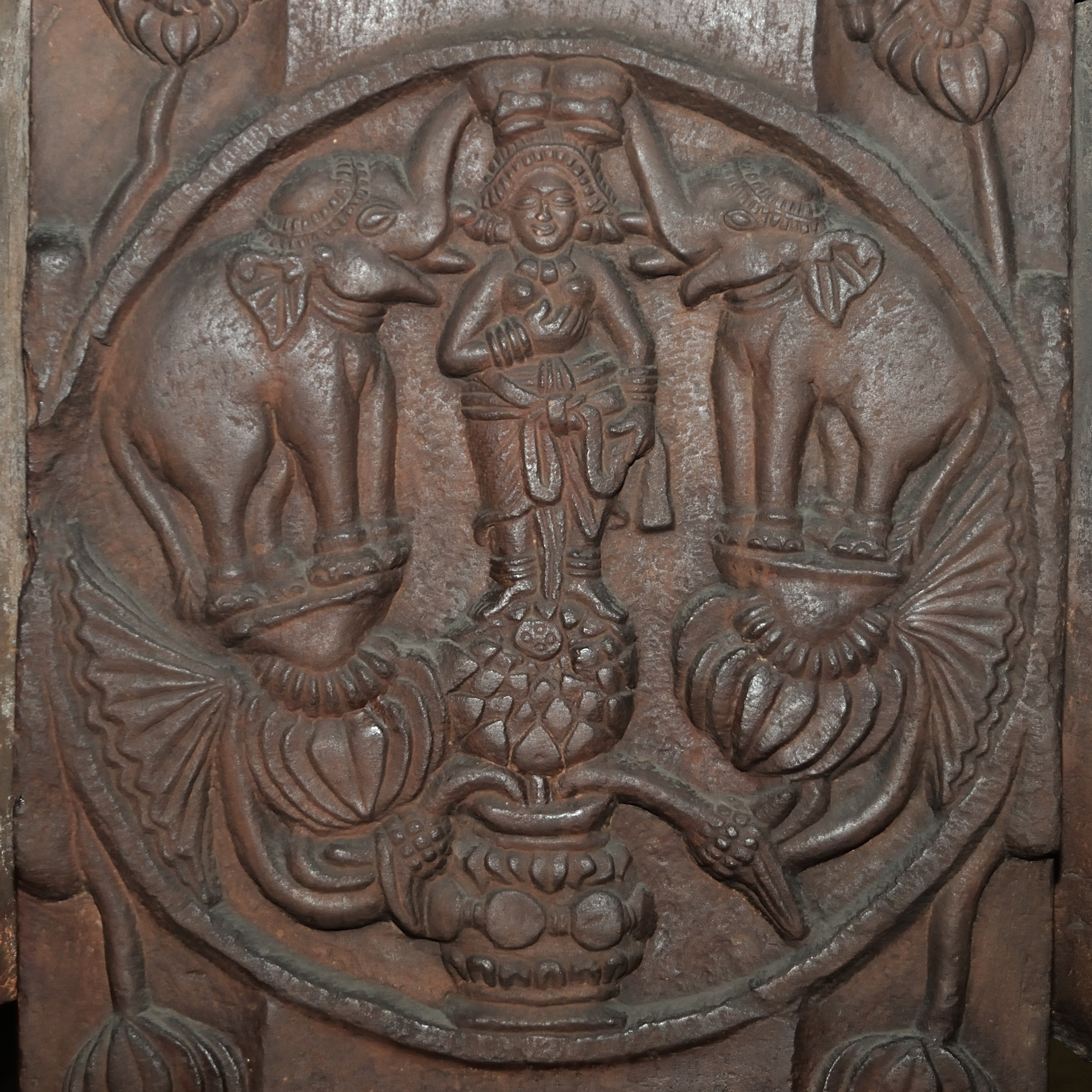
Gajalaxmi medallion from Bharhut stupa railing pillar, sandstone, 125-100 BCE. Indian Museum, Kolkata

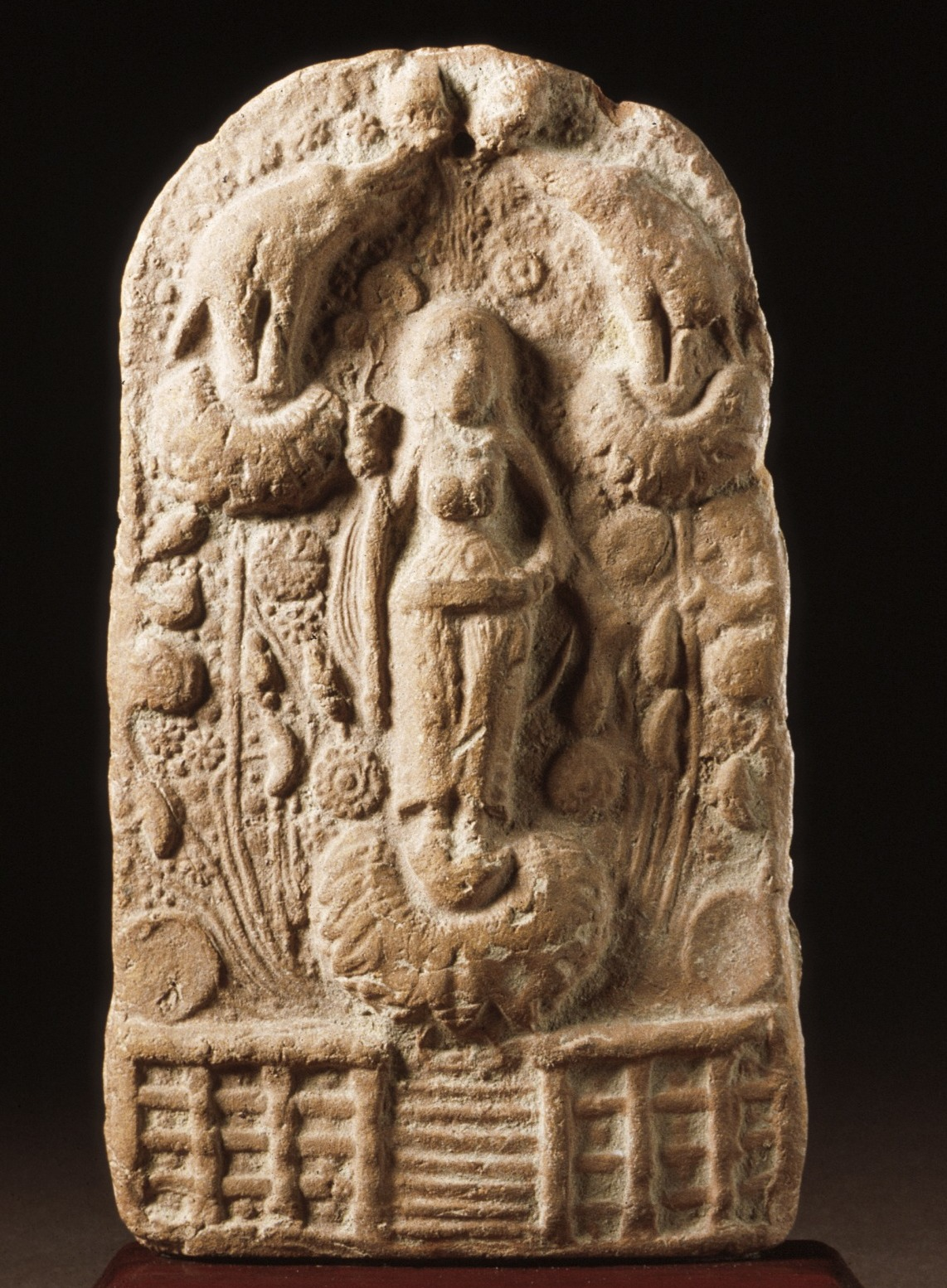
1st century BCE

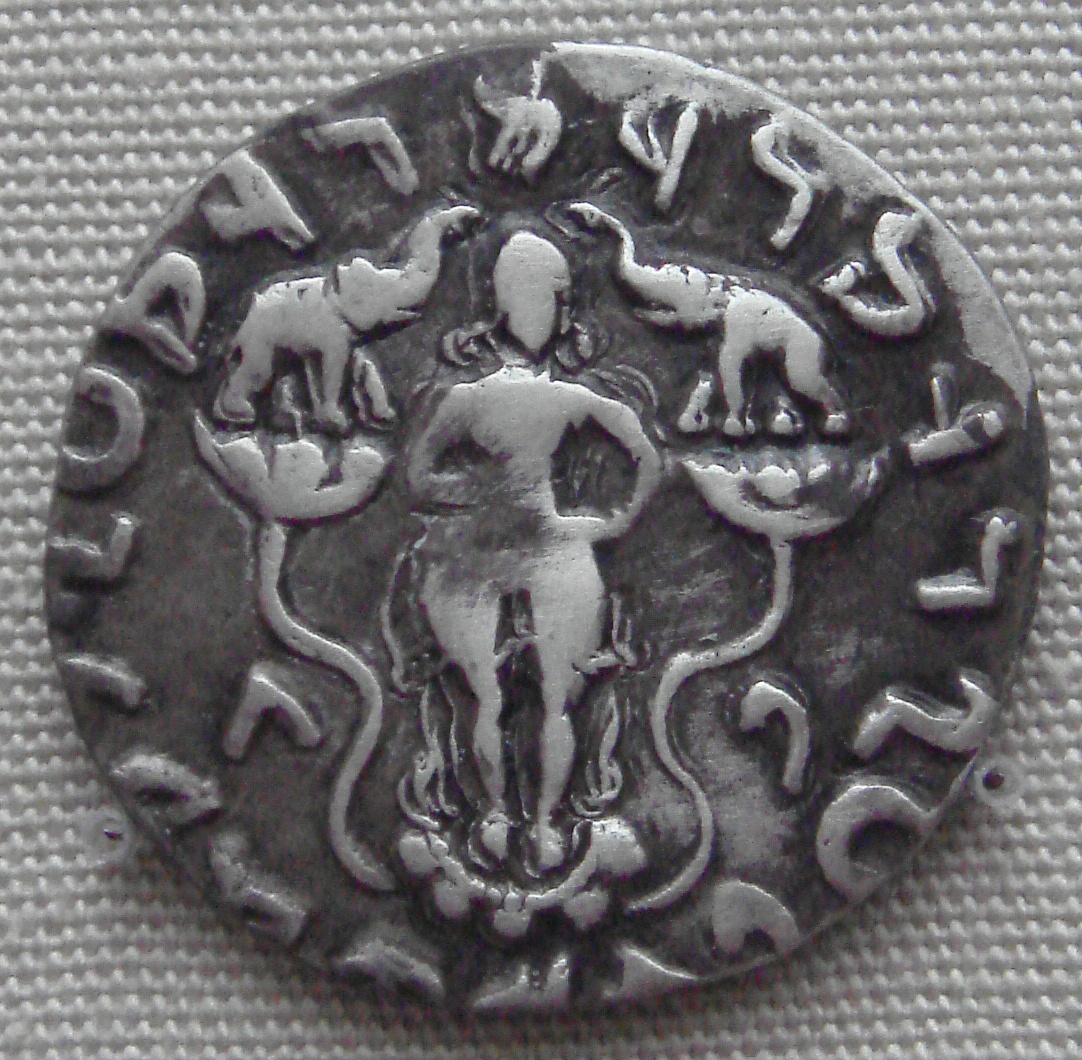
Coin of Azilises, 1st century BCE

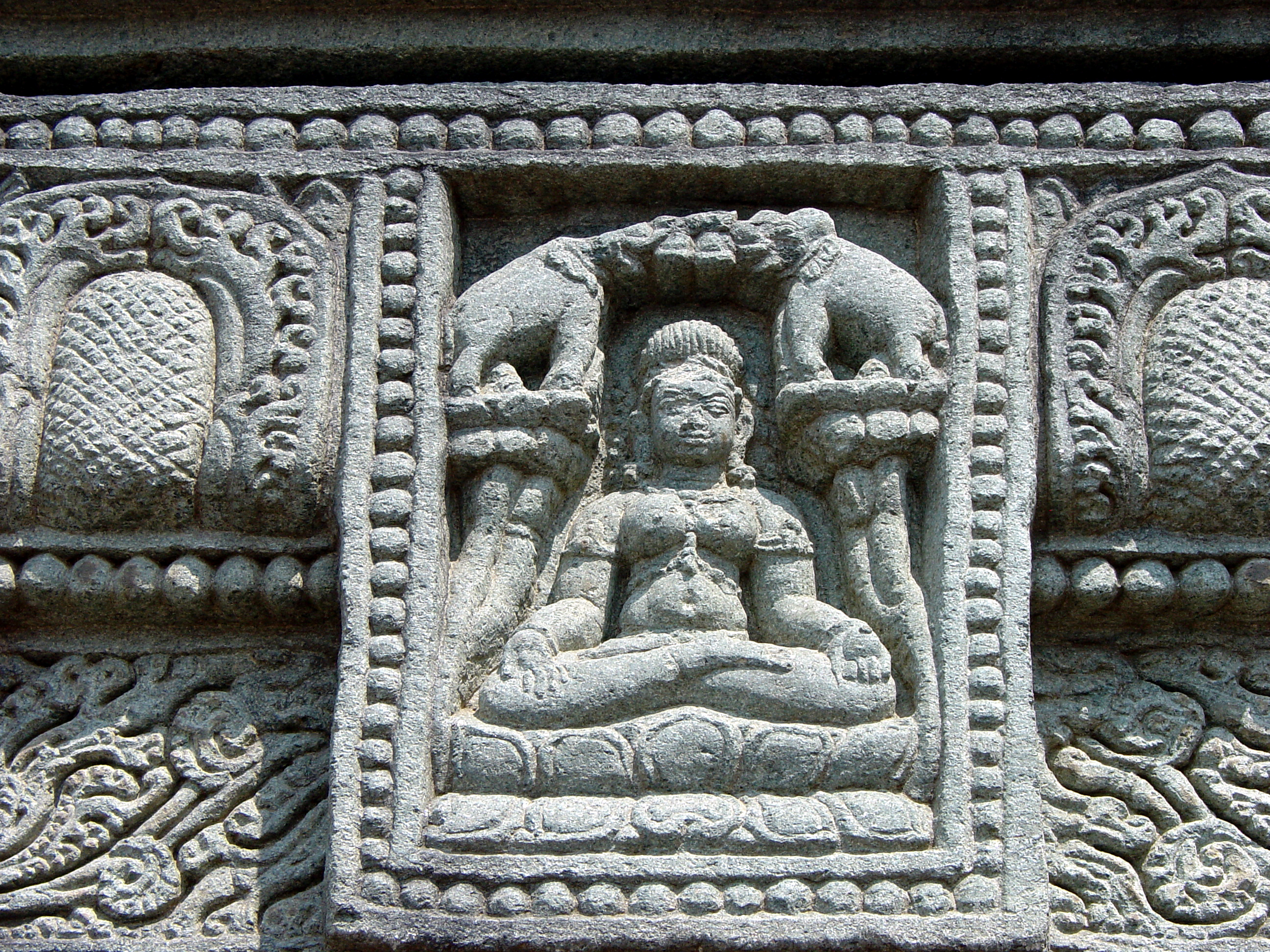
Over the doorway of the Buddhist Monastery 1 at Ratnagiri, Odisha

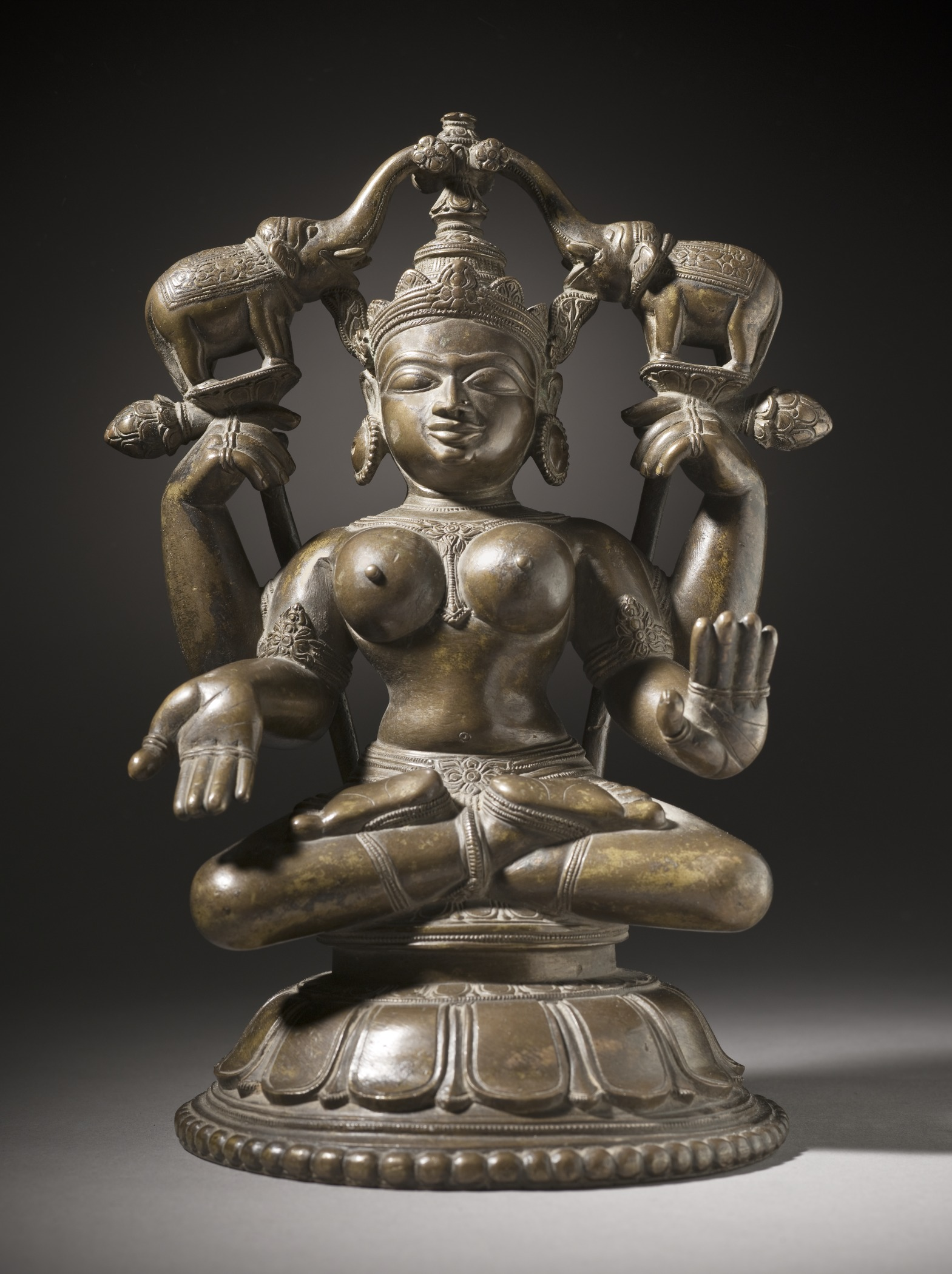
Odisha, 18th century

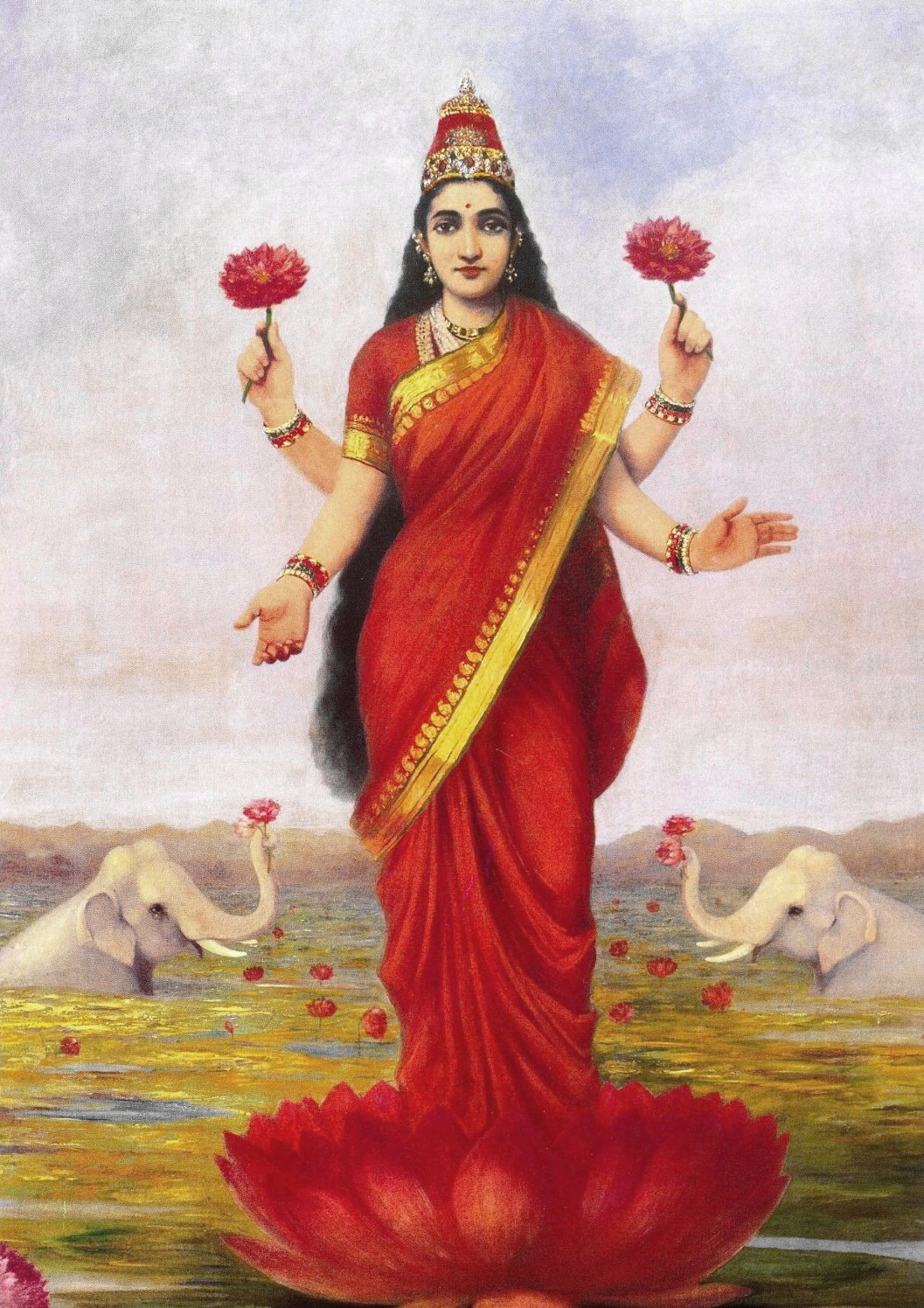
Raja Ravi Varma, Goddess Lakshmi, 1896
