= Telephus Euergetes =

Telephos Euergetes (the Benefactor)
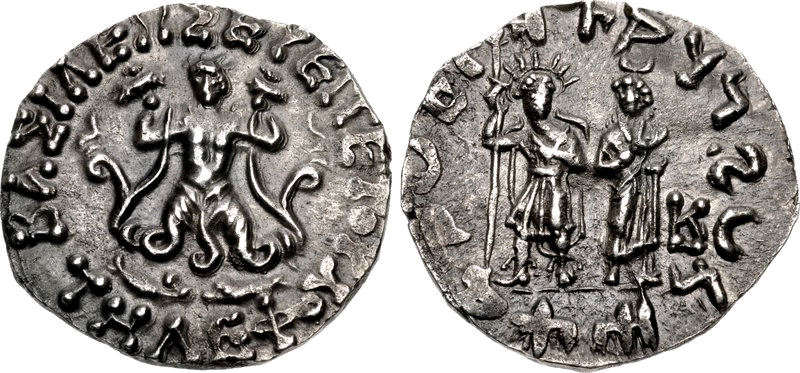
- Obv: Anguipede, the limbs ending in lotus blossoms. Greek legend: ΒΑΣΙΛΕΩΣ ΕΥΕΡΓΕΤΟΥ ΤΗΛΕΦΟΥ (King Telephus the Benefactor); Rev: Helios radiate and Silene with crescent. Kharoshthi legend: MAHARAJASA KALAKRAMASA TELIPHASA (King Telephus the Benefactor).

Indo-Greek king
- Reign: 75–70 BCE
- Born: Sagala

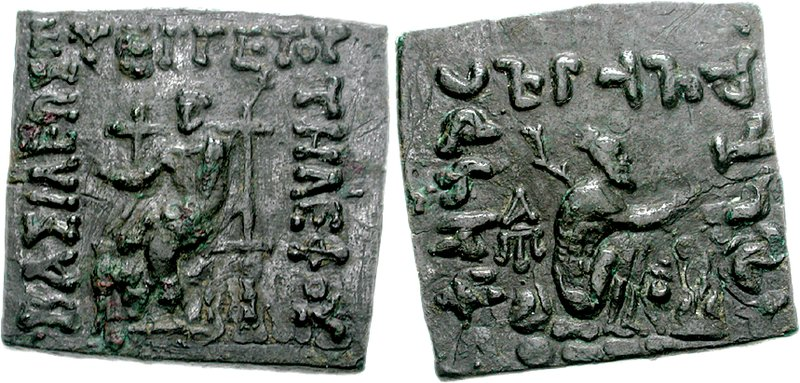
Bronze coin of king Telephus. Obv: Zeus seated on a throne, scepter in left hand, forming a benediction gesture with the right hand, similar to the Buddhist vitarka mudra. Greek legend: ΒΑΣΙΛΕΩΣ ΕΥΕΡΓΕΤΟΥ ΤΗΛΕΦΟΥ Rev: Squatting man, right hand forward. Kharoshthi legend: MAHARAJASA KALAKRAMASA TELIPHASA.

Telephus Euergetes (Ancient Greek: Τήλεφος Εὐεργέτης, romanized: Tēlephos Euergetēs; Euergetes means "the Benefactor") was a late Indo-Greek king who seems to have been one of the weak and brief successors of Maues. Bopearachchi dates Telephus between 75–70 BCE and places him in Gandhara, Senior to c. 60 BCE and suggests that he ruled in some parts of Pushkalavati or even further west.

Nothing is known about his dynastic connections. His few coins are rather singular and none of them bear his likeness, a rare occurrence in Indo-Greek coinage. Despite his Greek name, Telephus might therefore have been a ruler of Saka origin. His epithet was also unprecedented.

== Coinage ==
The silver coinage of Telephus is rare and mostly consists of drachms; only a few tetradrachms are known. On the Greek side is a serpent-footed monster holding the stems of two plants, and on the Kharoshthi side two deities that probably should be identified with Helios and Selene, the sun and moon. Both types were unique in the area, though the monster would later appear on bronzes of Hippostratus.

An example of one of his bronzes is seen above, The obverse is the common type of sitting Zeus making a benediction gesture, whereas on the reverse is the unique type of a squatting man holding what on some specimens looks like a spear, on others a palm branch.

Telephus used only two monograms, which he inherited from Maues.

=== Overstrikes ===
Telephos overstruck the earlier king Archebius.

== See also ==
- Greco-Bactrian Kingdom
- Greco-Buddhism
- Indo-Scythians
- Indo-Parthian Kingdom
- Kushan Empire

Preceded by Maues as Indo-Scythian king	Indo-Greek ruler of Gandhara; 75–70 BCE	Succeeded by Azes I as Indo-Scythian king

	Greco-Bactrian kings		Indo-Greek kings					
Territories/ dates	West Bactria	East Bactria	Paropamisade	Arachosia	Gandhara	Western Punjab	Eastern Punjab	Mathura
326-325 BCE	Campaigns of Alexander the Great in India						Nanda Empire	
312 BCE	Creation of the Seleucid Empire						Creation of the Maurya Empire	
305 BCE	Seleucid Empire after Mauryan war		Maurya Empire					
280 BCE	Foundation of Ai-Khanoum							
255–239 BCE	Independence of the Greco-Bactrian kingdom Diodotus I		Emperor Ashoka (268-232 BCE)					
239–223 BCE	Diodotus II							
230–200 BCE	Euthydemus I							
200–190 BCE	Demetrius I				Sunga Empire			
190-185 BCE	Euthydemus II							
190–180 BCE	Agathocles			Pantaleon				
185–170 BCE	Antimachus I							
180–160 BCE			Apollodotus I					
175–170 BCE	Demetrius II							
160–155 BCE			Antimachus II					
170–145 BCE	Eucratides I							
155–130 BCE	Yuezhi occupation, loss of Ai-Khanoum	Eucratides II; Plato; Heliocles I	Menander I					
130–120 BCE	Yuezhi occupation		Zoilus I		Agathoclea			Yavanarajya inscription
120–110 BCE			Lysias		Strato I			Yavanarajya inscription
110–100 BCE			Antialcidas		Heliocles II			Yavanarajya inscription
100 BCE			Polyxenus		Demetrius III			Yavanarajya inscription
100–95 BCE			Philoxenus					Yavanarajya inscription
95–90 BCE			Diomedes	Amyntas		Epander		Yavanarajya inscription
90 BCE			Theophilus	Peucolaus		Thraso		Yavanarajya inscription
90–85 BCE			Nicias	Menander II		Artemidorus		Yavanarajya inscription
90–70 BCE			Hermaeus	Archebius				Yavanarajya inscription
			Yuezhi occupation		Maues (Indo-Scythian)			
75–70 BCE				Vonones	Telephus	Apollodotus II		
65–55 BCE				Spalirises		Hippostratus	Dionysius	
55–35 BCE					Azes I (Indo-Scythians)		Zoilus II	
55–35 BCE					Vijayamitra/ Azilises		Apollophanes	
25 BCE – 10 CE				Gondophares	Zeionises	Kharahostes	Strato II; Strato III	
				Gondophares (Indo-Parthian)			Rajuvula (Indo-Scythian)	
			Kujula Kadphises (Kushan Empire)				Bhadayasa (Indo-Scythian)	Sodasa (Indo-Scythian)
