= Euergetes =

Honorable title given to benefactors in ancient Greece and the Hellenistic period

Euergetes (Ancient Greek: Εὐεργέτης, Euergétēs), meaning "the Benefactor" (from ευ-, "good", + εργετης, "doer, worker"), was an epithet, an honoring title, given to various benefactors. Euergetism (literally "doing good deeds") was the practice of high-status and wealthy individuals distributing part of their wealth to the community. For example,

- Archelaus I of Macedon supplied wood to Athens, taking the titles of proxenos and euergetes in 407/6 BC.
- Diogenes Euergetes a Macedonian commander who was named euergetes by the Athenians.
- Antigonus III Doson, king of Macedon from 229-221 BC, was called Euergetes.

The title was given to several Hellenistic monarchs:

- Alexander I Theopator Euergetes, Seleucid king, reigned 150-145 BC
- Antiochus VII Euergetes, Seleucid king, reigned 138–129 BC
- Attalus III Philometor Euergetes, king of Pergamon, reigned 138–133 BC
- Mithridates V Euergetes, king of Pontus, reigned 150–120 BC
- Nicomedes III Euergetes, king of Bithynia, reigned 127–94 BC
- Ptolemy III Euergetes, king of Egypt, reigned 246–222 BC
- Ptolemy VIII Euergetes II, king of Egypt, reigned 169–164, 144–132, 126–116 BC
- Telephos Euergetes, Indo-Greek ruler, reigned 75–70 BC
- Tiraios I Euergetes, king of Characene, reigned 95/94-90/89 BC
- Demetrius III Theos Philopator Soter Philometor Euergetes Callinicus, Seleucid king, reigned 96–87 BC

The feminine form Euergetis (Εὐεργέτις) was also used:

- Cleopatra Euergetis, queen of Egypt, reigned 142–131, 127–101 BC

== See also ==
- Soter
- Epiphanes (disambiguation)
- Eusebes (disambiguation)
- Inscription of Parthian imperial power
