= Azes II =

- Indo-Scythian king
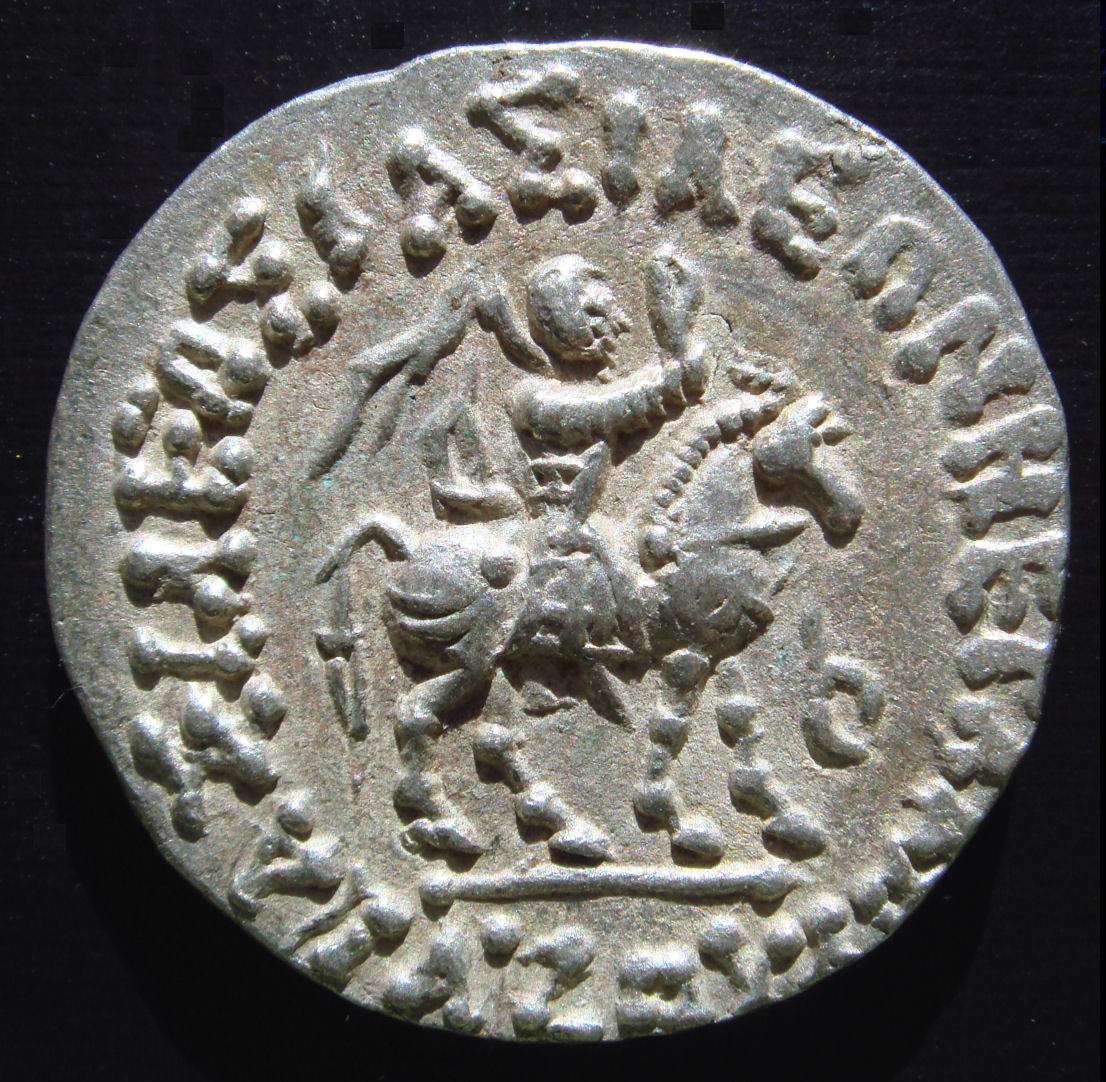
- Azes II in armour, riding a horse, on one of his silver tetradrachms, minted in Gandhara
- Reign: Scythians: perhaps 35–12 BC
- Predecessor: Azilises
- Successor: Zeionises/Kharahostes

Azes II (Greek: Ἄζης Azēs, epigraphically ΑΖΟΥ Azou; Kharosthi: 𐨀𐨩 A-ya, Aya), may have been the last Indo-Scythian king, speculated to have reigned circa 35–12 BCE, in what is now Pakistan. His existence has been questioned; if he did not exist, artefacts attributed to his reign, such as coins, are likely to be those of Azes I.

After the death of Azes II, the rule of the Indo-Scythians in northwestern India and Pakistan finally crumbled with the conquest of the Kushans, one of the five tribes of the Yuezhi who had lived in Bactria for more than a century, and who were then expanding into India to create a Kushan Empire. Soon after, the Parthians invaded from the west. Their leader Gondophares temporarily displaced the Kushans and founded the Indo-Parthian Kingdom that was to last until the middle of the 1st century CE. The Kushans ultimately regained northwestern India circa 75 CE, where they were to prosper for several centuries.

== Name ==
Azes's name is attested on his coins in the Greek form Azēs (Ἄζης) and the Kharosthi form Aya (𐨀𐨩), which are both derived from the Saka name *Aza, meaning "leader".

== Buddhist dedications ==
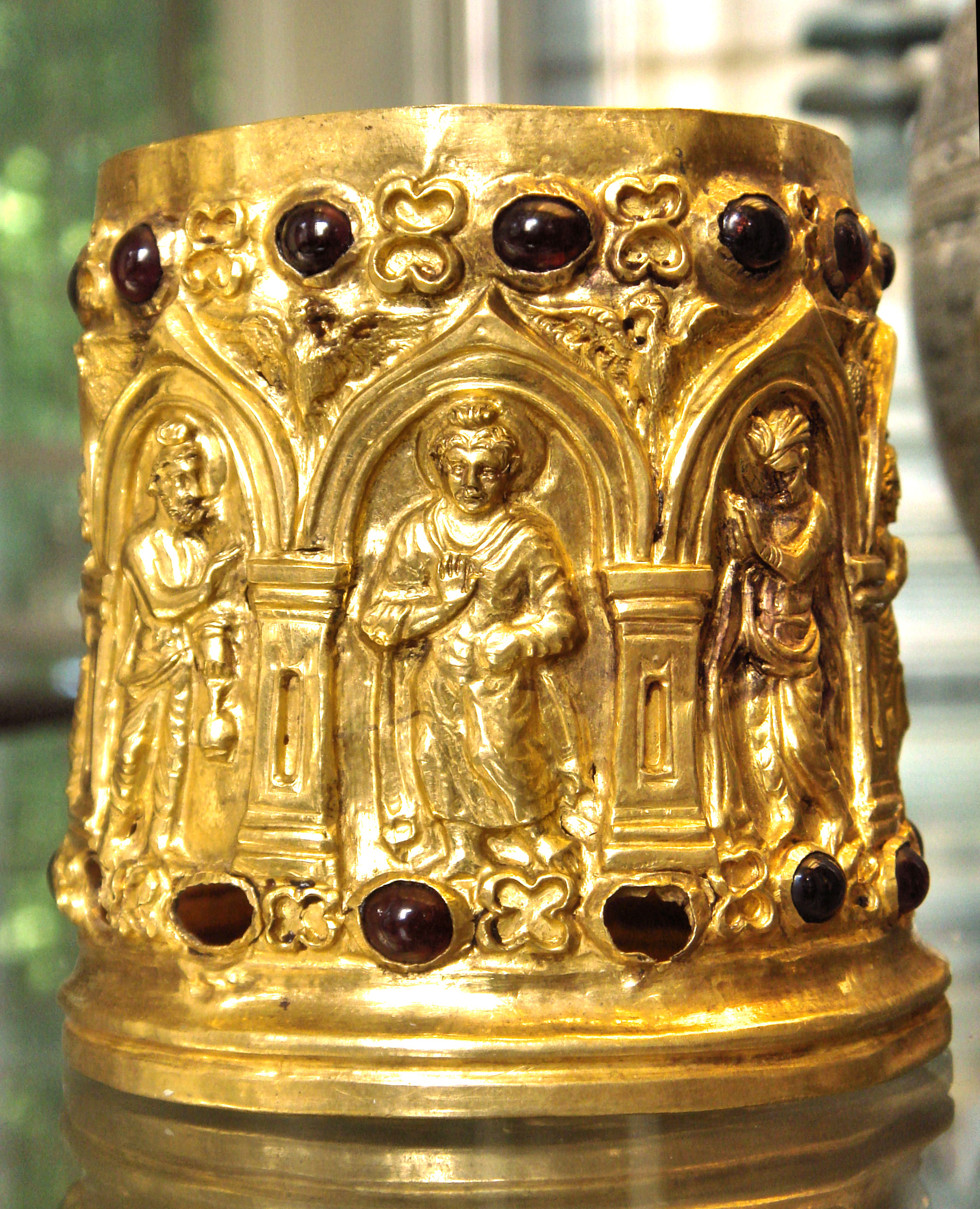
The Bimaran casket, representing the Buddha surrounded by Brahman (left) and Indra (right) was found inside a stupa with coins of Azes II inside. British Museum.

=== Bimaran casket ===
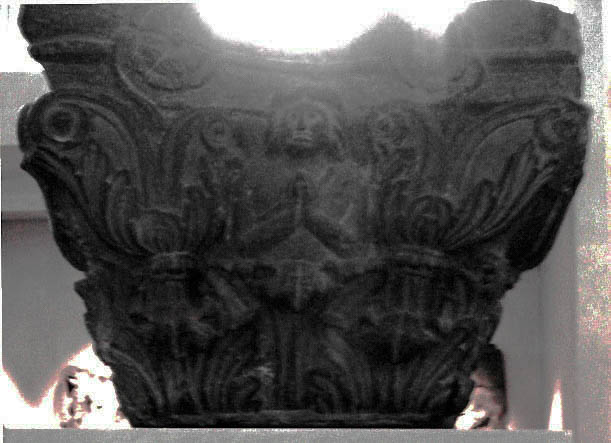
The Indo-Corinthian capital from Butkara Stupa under which a coin of Azes II was found. Dated to 20 BCE or earlier (Turin City Museum of Ancient Art).

Azes II is also connected to the Bimaran casket, one of the earliest representations of the Buddha. The casket was part of the deposit of Stupa 2 in Bimaran, near Jalalabad in Afghanistan, and placed inside the stupa with several coins of Azes II. This event may have happened during the reign of Azes (35–12 BCE), or slightly later. The Indo-Scythians are otherwise connected with Buddhism (see Mathura lion capital and the multiple Buddhist dedications of the Apracas), and it is indeed possible they would have commended the work. However it now thought that a later king, issuing coins in the name of Azes, such as Kharahostes, made the dedication.

=== Butkara stupa ===
A coin of Azes II was found under a pillar with an Indo-Corinthian capital and sculpture of a Buddhist devotee in the Butkara Stupa, suggesting the involvement of Azes II in Buddhist dedications, and a datation for the sculpture corresponding to the reign of Azes II.

== Coinage ==
Coins attributed to Azes II use Greek and Kharoshti inscriptions, depict a Greek goddess as his protector, and thereby essentially follow the numismatic model of the Greek kings of the Indo-Greek kingdom, suggesting a high willingness to accommodate Greek culture. A novel difference of the Indo-Scythians was to show the king on a horse, rather than his bust in profile as did the Greeks.

Other coins of Azes depict the Buddhist lion and the Brahmanic cow of Shiva, suggesting religious tolerance towards his subjects. In the coin depicted to the left Azes is depicted with the inscriptions:

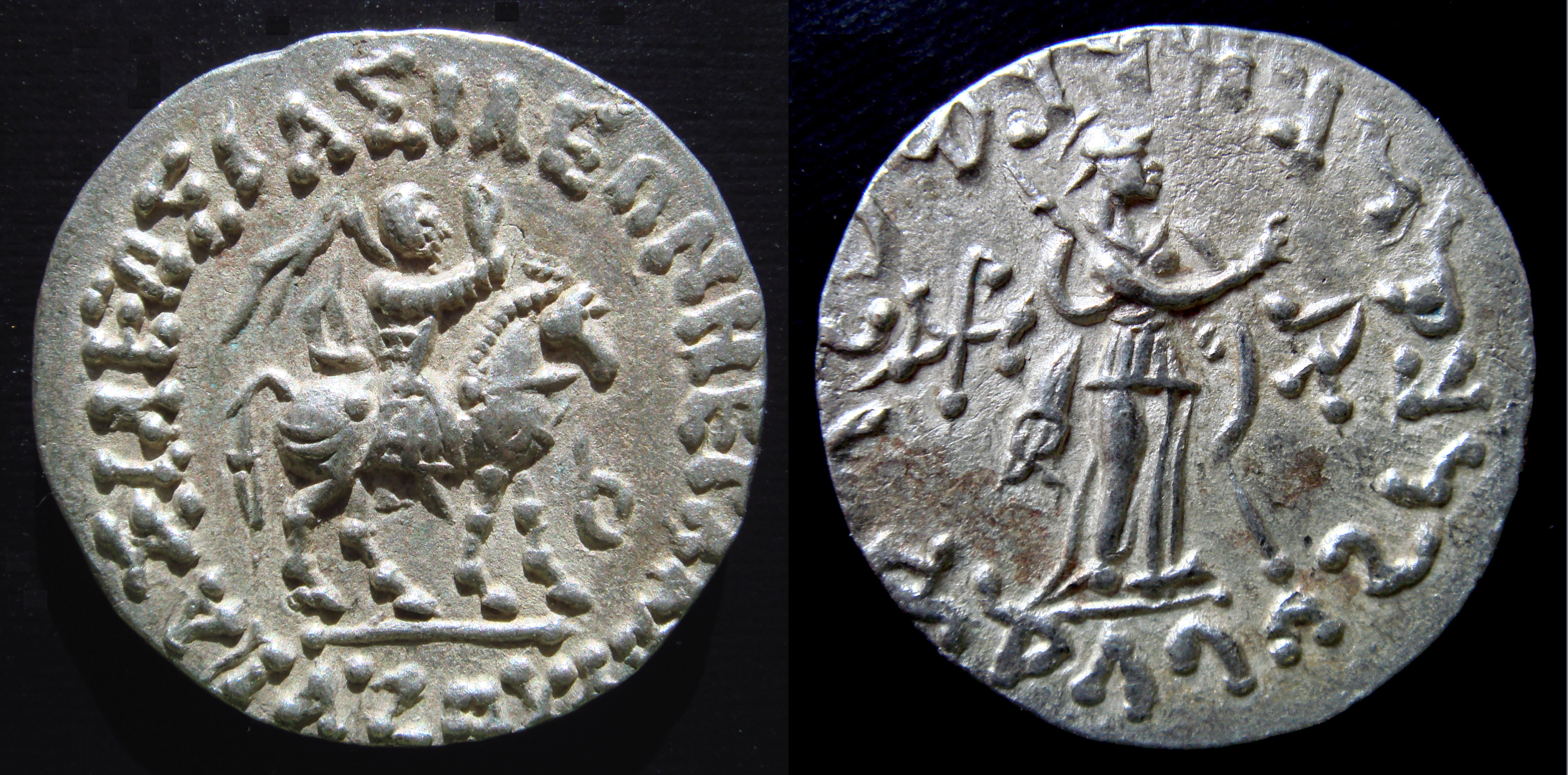
Silver coin of King Azes II (r. c. 35–12 BCE)

- Obv: King with coat of mail, on horse, holding a sceptre, with Greek royal headband. Greek legend ΒΑΣΙΛΕΩΣ ΒΑΣΙΛΕΩΝ ΜΕΓΑΛΟΥ ΑΖΟΥ "The Great King of Kings Azes".
- Rev: Athena with shield and lance, making a hand gesture identical to the Buddhist vitarka mudra. Kharoshti legend MAHARAJASA RAJADIRAJASA MAHATASA AYASA "The Great King of Kings Azes", with the Buddhist triratna symbol in the left field.

Azes II was long believed to have issued several of the Indo-Scythian coins struck under the name Azes in northern India. All these coins were however likely issued by a single ruler named Azes, as suggested by Robert Senior, when he found an overstrike of a coin attributed to Azes I over a coin attributed to Azes II, suggesting that all the "Azes II" coins were not later than those of "Azes I" and that there was only one king in the dynasty named Azes. This idea had long been advocated by Senior with a number of indirect numismatic arguments, for instance in his encyclopaedia of Indo-Scythian coins.

=== Coin gallery ===
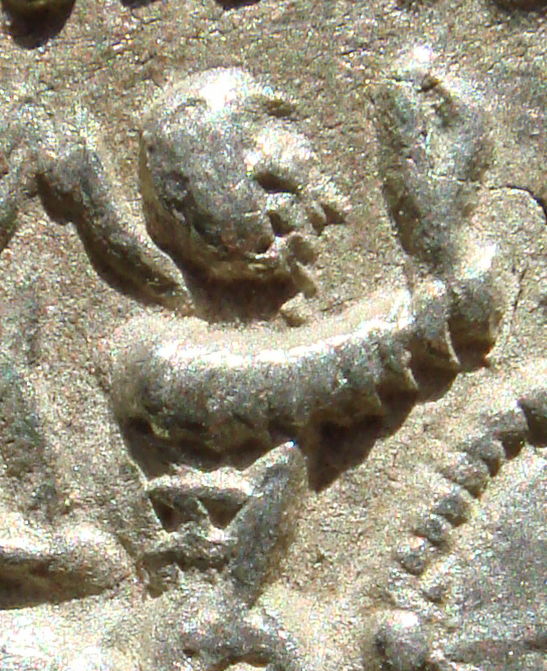
Portrait of Azes II

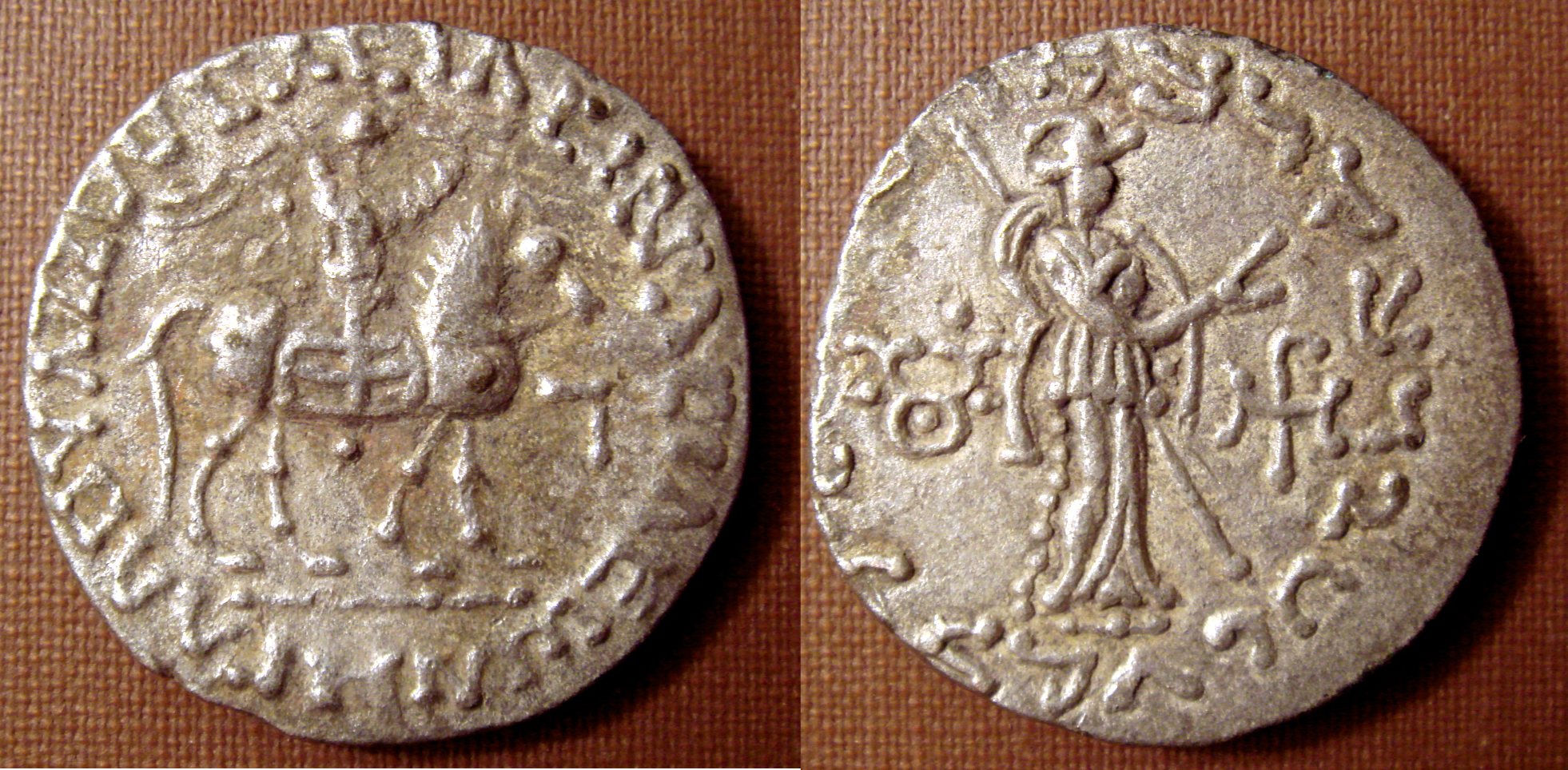
Coin of Azes II with Buddhist triratna symbol.

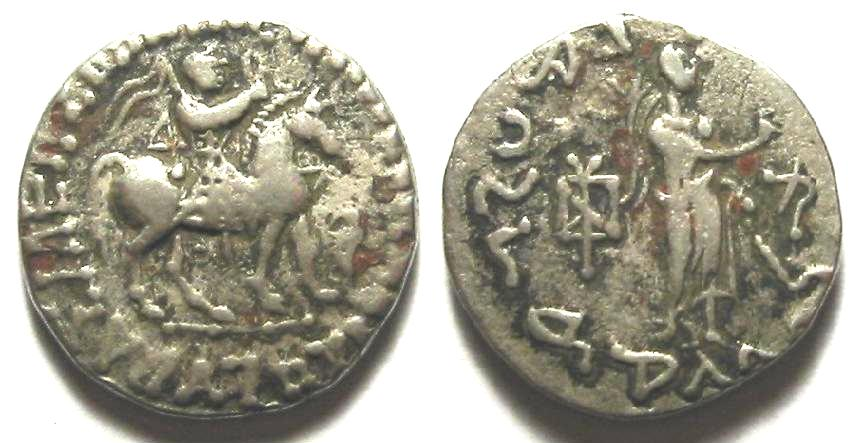
Coin of Azes II.

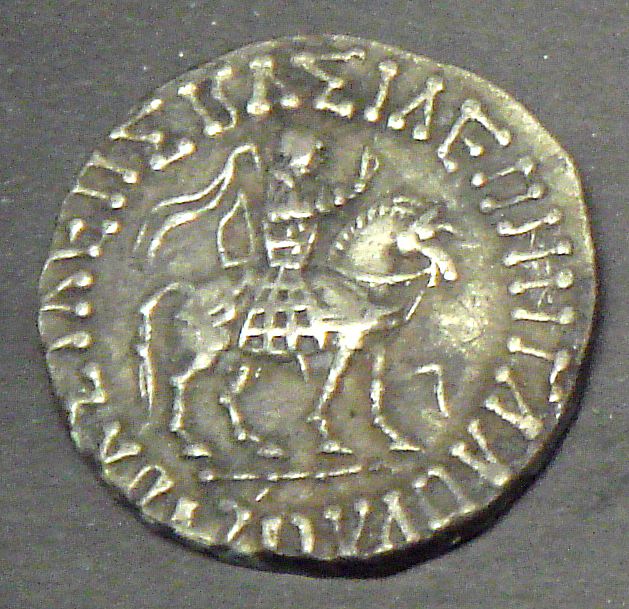
Coin of Azes II, with a clear depiction of his military outfit, with coat of mail and reflex bow in the saddle.

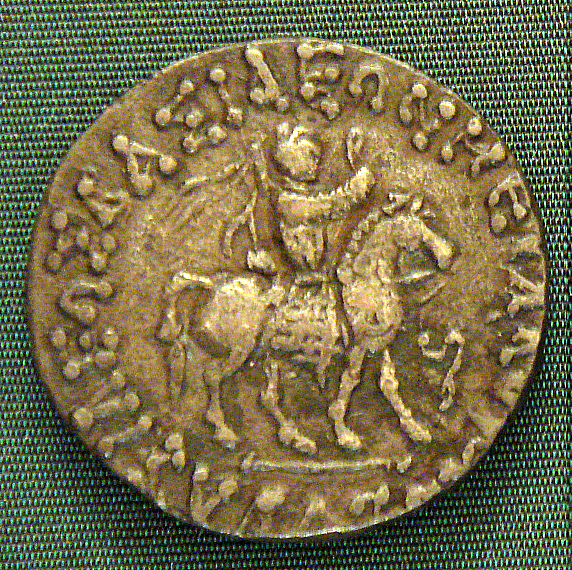

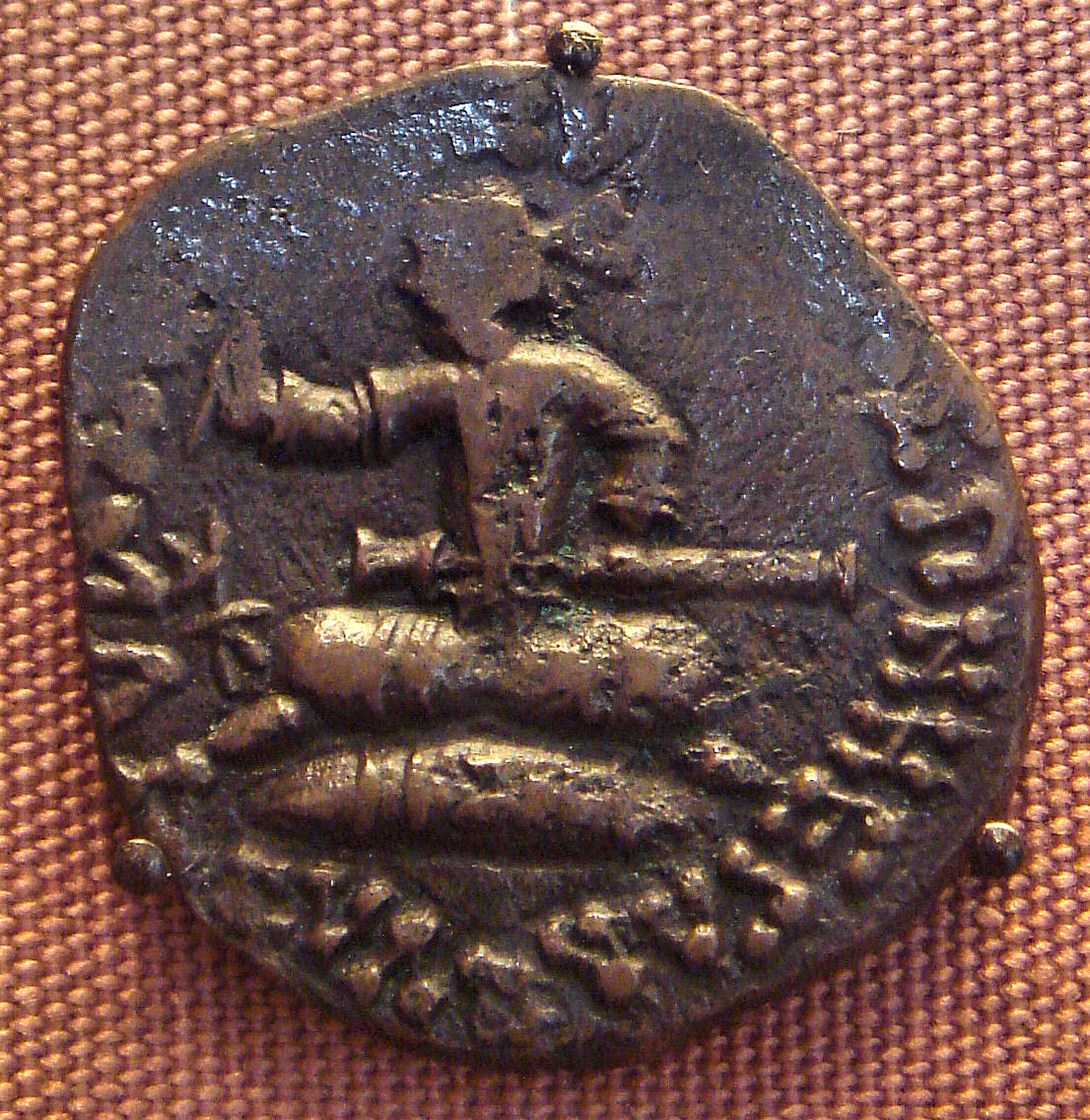
Coin of Azes II, with king seated, holding a drawn sword and a whip.

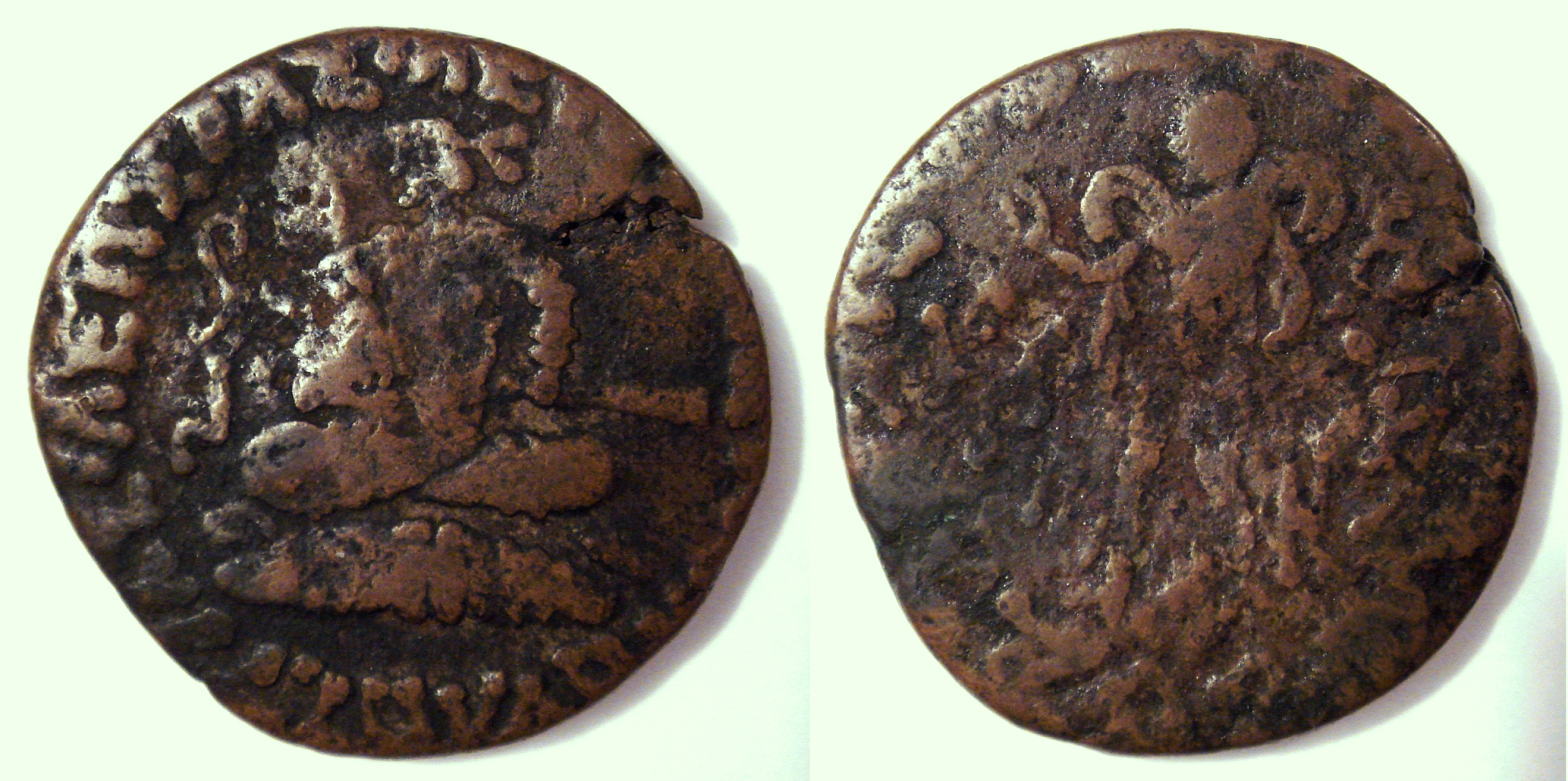
Seated king Azes II

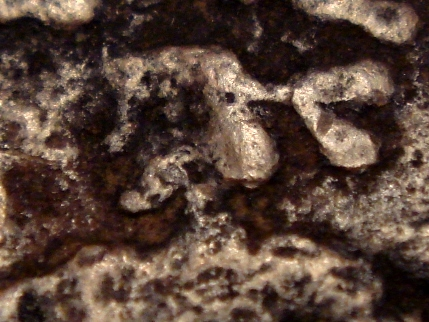
Profile of king Azes II.

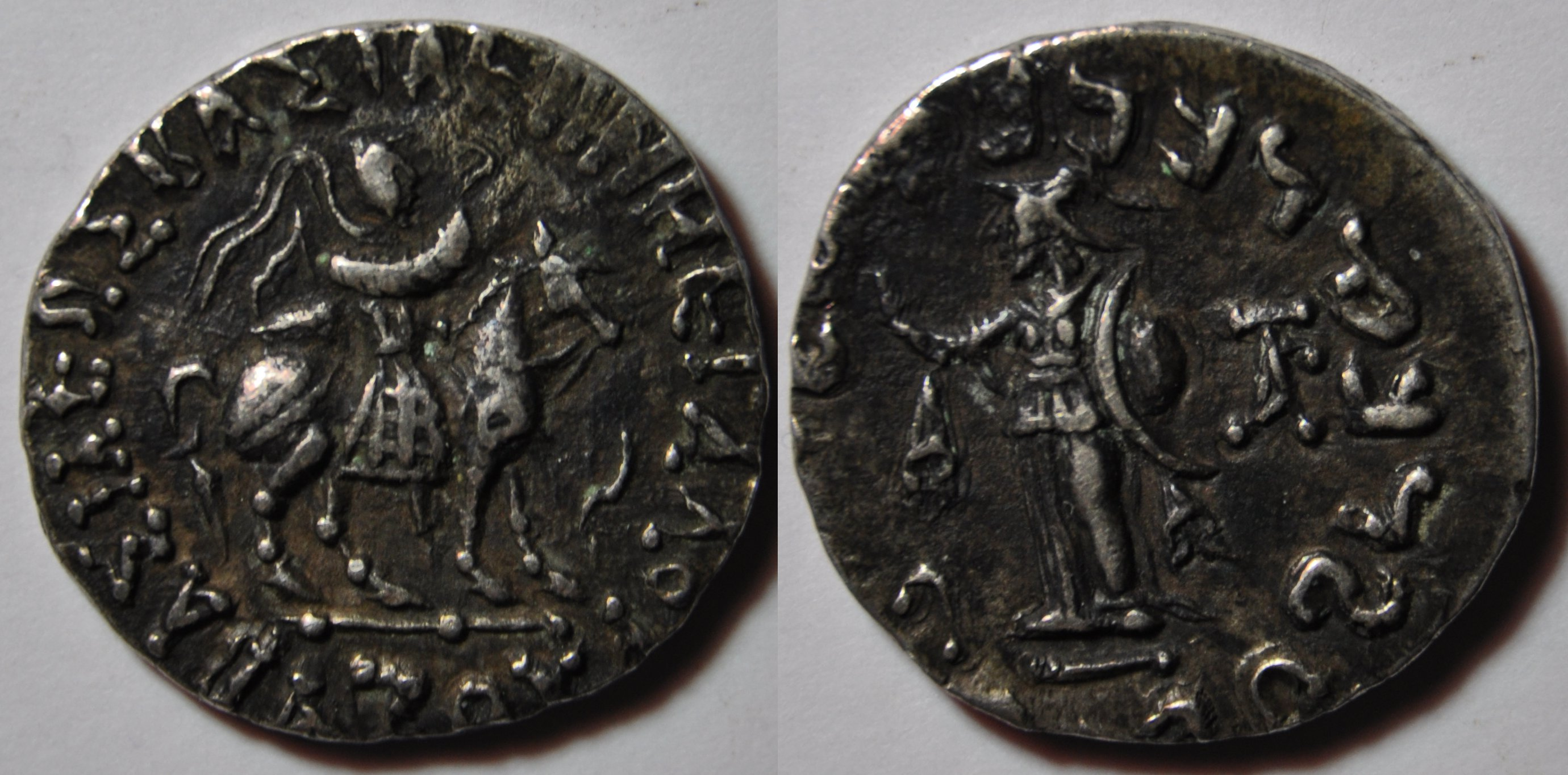
Coin

== See also ==
- Ancient India and Central Asia
- Greco-Bactrian Kingdom
- Indo-Greek Kingdom
- Indo-Parthian Kingdom
- Kushan Empire
- Tillia tepe
- Yuezhi
- Kambojas
- Saka

== Footnotes ==
Preceded by Azilises	Indo-Scythian Ruler (35–12 BCE)	Succeeded by In Kashmir: Zeionises In Mathura: Kharahostes

Territories/ dates	Western India	Western Pakistan Balochistan	Paropamisadae Arachosia	Bajaur	Gandhara	Western Punjab	Eastern Punjab	Mathura
			INDO-GREEK KINGDOM					
90–85 BCE			Nicias	Menander II		Artemidoros		
90–70 BCE			Hermaeus	Archebius				
85-60 BCE			INDO-SCYTHIAN KINGDOM; Maues					
75–70 BCE			Vonones; Spalahores	Telephos		Apollodotus II		
65–55 BCE			Spalirises; Spalagadames			Hippostratos	Dionysios	
55–35 BCE			Azes I				Zoilos II	
55–35 BCE			Azilises; Azes II				Apollophanes	Indo-Scythian dynasty of the NORTHERN SATRAPS; Hagamasha
25 BCE – 10 CE				Indo-Scythian dynasty of the APRACHARAJAS; Vijayamitra (ruled 12 BCE - 15 CE) (Note: From the dated inscription on the Rukhana reliquary)	Liaka Kusulaka; Patika Kusulaka; Zeionises	Kharahostes (ruled 10 BCE– 10 CE) (Note: An Inscribed Silver Buddhist Reliquary of the Time of King Kharaosta and Prince Indravarman, Richard Salomon, Journal of the American Oriental Society, Vol. 116, No. 3 (Jul. - Sep., 1996), pp. 442); Mujatria	Strato II and Strato III	Hagana
10-20 CE		INDO-PARTHIAN KINGDOM; Gondophares		Indravasu	INDO-PARTHIAN KINGDOM; Gondophares		Rajuvula	
20-30 CE			Ubouzanes; Pakores	Vispavarma (ruled c.0-20 CE) (Note: A Kharosthī Reliquary Inscription of the Time of the Apraca Prince Visnuvarma, by Richard Salomon, South Asian Studies 11 1995, Pages 27-32, Published online: 09 Aug 2010)	Sarpedones		Bhadayasa	Sodasa
30-40 CE			KUSHAN EMPIRE; Kujula Kadphises	Indravarma	Abdagases		...	...
40-45 CE				Aspavarma	Gadana		...	...
45-50 CE				Sasan	Sases		...	...
50-75 CE							...	...
75-100 CE	Indo-Scythian dynasty of the WESTERN SATRAPS; Chastana		Vima Takto				...	...
100-120 CE	Abhiraka		Vima Kadphises				...	...
120 CE	Bhumaka; Nahapana	PARATARAJAS; Yolamira	Kanishka I				Great Satrap Kharapallana and Satrap Vanaspara for Kanishka I	
130-230 CE	Jayadaman; Rudradaman I Damajadasri I Jivadaman; Rudrasimha I Satyadaman; Jivadaman; Rudrasena I	Bagamira; Arjuna; Hvaramira; Mirahvara	Vāsishka (c. 140 – c. 160); Huvishka (c. 160 – c. 190); Vasudeva I (c. 190 – to at least 230)					
230-280 CE	Samghadaman; Damasena; Damajadasri II; Viradaman; Isvaradatta; Yasodaman I Vijayasena; Damajadasri III; Rudrasena II; Visvasimha	Miratakhma; Kozana; Bhimarjuna; Koziya; Datarvharna; Datarvharna	INDO-SASANIANS; Ardashir I, Sassanid king and "Kushanshah" (c. 230 – 250); Peroz I, "Kushanshah" (c. 250 – 265); Hormizd I, "Kushanshah" (c. 265 – 295)			Kanishka II (c. 230 – 240); Vashishka (c. 240 – 250); Kanishka III (c. 250 – 275)		
280-300 CE	Bhratadarman	Datayola II	Hormizd II, "Kushanshah" (c. 295 – 300)			Vasudeva II (c. 275 – 310)		
300-320 CE	Visvasena; Rudrasimha II; Jivadaman		Peroz II, "Kushanshah" (c. 300 – 325)			Vasudeva III; Vasudeva IV; Vasudeva V Chhu (c. 310? – 325)		
320-388 CE	Yasodaman II; Rudradaman II; Rudrasena III; Simhasena; Rudrasena IV		Shapur II Sassanid king and "Kushanshah" (c. 325); Varhran I, Varhran II, Varhran III "Kushanshahs" (c. 325 – 350); Peroz III "Kushanshah" (c. 350 –360); HEPHTHALITE/ HUNAS invasions			Shaka I (c. 325 – 345); Kipunada (c. 345 – 375)		GUPTA EMPIRE; Chandragupta I Samudragupta
388-395 CE	Rudrasimha III		Chandragupta II					
