= Eusebes =

Eusebes (Greek: Εὐσεβής), meaning "the Pious", was an epithet given to several Hellenistic monarchs:

- Antiochus IX Eusebes, Seleucid King
- Antiochus X Eusebes Philopator, Seleucid King
- Ariarathes IV Eusebes, King of Cappadocia
- Ariarathes V Eusebes Philopator, King of Cappadocia
- Ariarathes IX Eusebes Philopator, King of Cappadocia
- Ariarathes X Eusebes Philadelphos, King of Cappadocia
- Ariobarzanes III Eusebes Philorhomaios, King of Cappadocia

== See also ==
- Pius
- Euergetes
- Epiphanes (disambiguation)
- Eupator (disambiguation)
