= Azes I =

- Indo-Scythian king
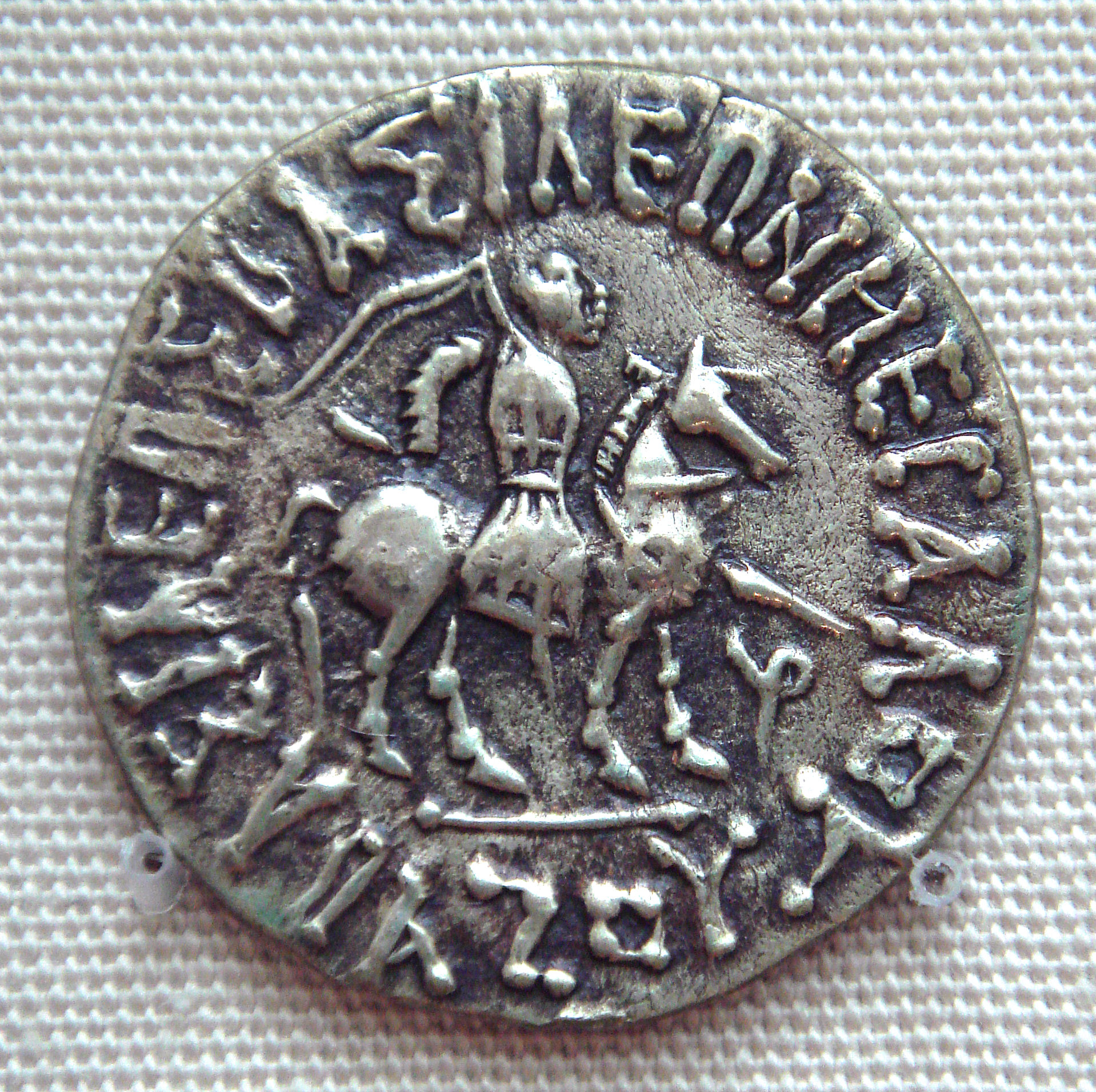
- Coin of Azes I. Obv: Azes I in military dress, on a horse, with couched spear. Greek legend: ΒΑΣΙΛΕΩΣ ΒΑΣΙΛΕΩΝ ΜΕΓΑΛΟΥ ΑΖΟΥ "of the Great King of Kings Azes". British Museum.
- Reign: c. 48/47 – 25 BCE
- Predecessor: Spalirises
- Successor: Azilises

Azes I (Greek: Ἄζης Azēs, epigraphically ΑΖΟΥ Azou; Kharosthi: 𐨀𐨩 A-ya, Aya) was an Indo-Scythian ruler who ruled around c. 48/47 BCE – 25 BCE with a dynastic empire based in the Punjab and Indus Valley, completed the domination of the Scythians in the northwestern Indian subcontinent.

== Name ==
Azes's name is attested on his coins in the Greek form Azēs (Ἄζης) and the Kharosthi form Aya (𐨀𐨩), which are both derived from the Saka name *Aza, meaning "leader".

== History ==
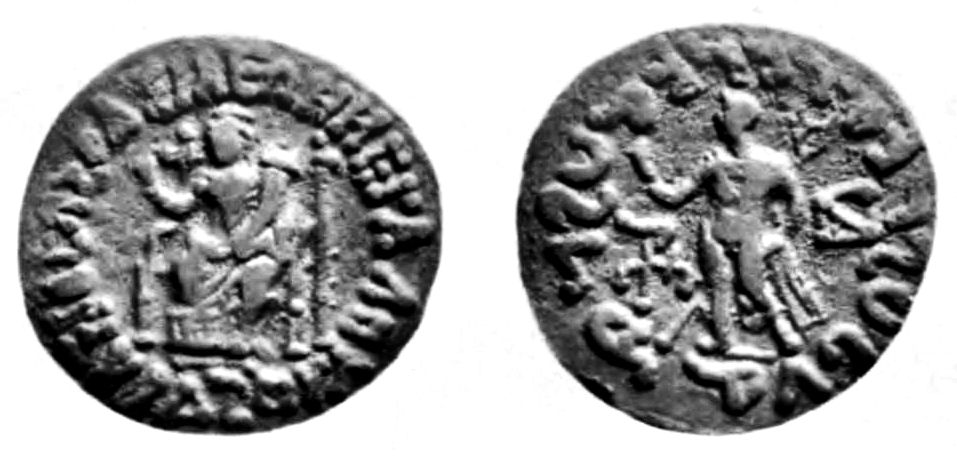
Coin of Azes with Demeter and Hermes.

Maues and his successors had conquered the areas of Gandhara, as well as the area of Mathura from 85 BCE forming the Northern Satraps.

== The Azes Era ==
Azes's most lasting legacy was the foundation of the Azes era. It was widely believed that the era was begun by Azes's successors by simply continuing the counting of his regnal years. However, Prof. Harry Falk has recently presented an inscription at several conferences which dates to Azes's reign, and suggests that the era may have been begun by Azes himself. Most popular historians date the start of the Azes era to 58 BC and believe it is the same as the later era known as the Malwa or Vikrama era.

However, a recently discovered inscription, the Bajaur reliquary inscription, dated in both the Azes and the Greek era suggests that actually this is not the case. The inscription gives the relationship Azes = Greek + 128. It is believed that the Greek era may have begun in 173 BCE, exactly 300 years before the first year of the Era of Kanishka. If that is the case then the Azes era would begin in about 45 BC.

== Azes I and Azes II identical? ==
According to Senior, Azes I may have been identical with Azes II, due to the discovery of an overstrike of the former over the latter.

== See also ==
- Yuezhi
- Greco-Bactrian Kingdom
- Indo-Greek Kingdom
- Indo-Parthian Kingdom
- Kushan Empire

== Notes ==
Preceded by Spalirises (Indo-Scythian king)	Indo-Scythian Ruler; 57 – 35 BCE	Succeeded by Azilises
Preceded by Telephos (Indo-Greek king in Arachosia and Gandhara)	Indo-Scythian Ruler; 57 – 35 BCE	Succeeded by Azilises
Preceded by Hippostratos (Indo-Greek king in Western Punjab)	Indo-Scythian Ruler; 57 – 35 BCE	Succeeded by Azilises

Territories/ dates	Western India	Western Pakistan Balochistan	Paropamisadae Arachosia	Bajaur	Gandhara	Western Punjab	Eastern Punjab	Mathura
			INDO-GREEK KINGDOM					
90–85 BCE			Nicias	Menander II		Artemidoros		
90–70 BCE			Hermaeus	Archebius				
85-60 BCE			INDO-SCYTHIAN KINGDOM; Maues					
75–70 BCE			Vonones; Spalahores	Telephos		Apollodotus II		
65–55 BCE			Spalirises; Spalagadames			Hippostratos	Dionysios	
55–35 BCE			Azes I				Zoilos II	
55–35 BCE			Azilises; Azes II				Apollophanes	Indo-Scythian dynasty of the NORTHERN SATRAPS; Hagamasha
25 BCE – 10 CE				Indo-Scythian dynasty of the APRACHARAJAS; Vijayamitra (ruled 12 BCE - 15 CE) (Note: From the dated inscription on the Rukhana reliquary)	Liaka Kusulaka; Patika Kusulaka; Zeionises	Kharahostes (ruled 10 BCE– 10 CE) (Note: An Inscribed Silver Buddhist Reliquary of the Time of King Kharaosta and Prince Indravarman, Richard Salomon, Journal of the American Oriental Society, Vol. 116, No. 3 (Jul. - Sep., 1996), pp. 442); Mujatria	Strato II and Strato III	Hagana
10-20 CE		INDO-PARTHIAN KINGDOM; Gondophares		Indravasu	INDO-PARTHIAN KINGDOM; Gondophares		Rajuvula	
20-30 CE			Ubouzanes; Pakores	Vispavarma (ruled c.0-20 CE) (Note: A Kharosthī Reliquary Inscription of the Time of the Apraca Prince Visnuvarma, by Richard Salomon, South Asian Studies 11 1995, Pages 27-32, Published online: 09 Aug 2010)	Sarpedones		Bhadayasa	Sodasa
30-40 CE			KUSHAN EMPIRE; Kujula Kadphises	Indravarma	Abdagases		...	...
40-45 CE				Aspavarma	Gadana		...	...
45-50 CE				Sasan	Sases		...	...
50-75 CE							...	...
75-100 CE	Indo-Scythian dynasty of the WESTERN SATRAPS; Chastana		Vima Takto				...	...
100-120 CE	Abhiraka		Vima Kadphises				...	...
120 CE	Bhumaka; Nahapana	PARATARAJAS; Yolamira	Kanishka I				Great Satrap Kharapallana and Satrap Vanaspara for Kanishka I	
130-230 CE	Jayadaman; Rudradaman I Damajadasri I Jivadaman; Rudrasimha I Satyadaman; Jivadaman; Rudrasena I	Bagamira; Arjuna; Hvaramira; Mirahvara	Vāsishka (c. 140 – c. 160); Huvishka (c. 160 – c. 190); Vasudeva I (c. 190 – to at least 230)					
230-280 CE	Samghadaman; Damasena; Damajadasri II; Viradaman; Isvaradatta; Yasodaman I Vijayasena; Damajadasri III; Rudrasena II; Visvasimha	Miratakhma; Kozana; Bhimarjuna; Koziya; Datarvharna; Datarvharna	INDO-SASANIANS; Ardashir I, Sassanid king and "Kushanshah" (c. 230 – 250); Peroz I, "Kushanshah" (c. 250 – 265); Hormizd I, "Kushanshah" (c. 265 – 295)			Kanishka II (c. 230 – 240); Vashishka (c. 240 – 250); Kanishka III (c. 250 – 275)		
280-300 CE	Bhratadarman	Datayola II	Hormizd II, "Kushanshah" (c. 295 – 300)			Vasudeva II (c. 275 – 310)		
300-320 CE	Visvasena; Rudrasimha II; Jivadaman		Peroz II, "Kushanshah" (c. 300 – 325)			Vasudeva III; Vasudeva IV; Vasudeva V Chhu (c. 310? – 325)		
320-388 CE	Yasodaman II; Rudradaman II; Rudrasena III; Simhasena; Rudrasena IV		Shapur II Sassanid king and "Kushanshah" (c. 325); Varhran I, Varhran II, Varhran III "Kushanshahs" (c. 325 – 350); Peroz III "Kushanshah" (c. 350 –360); HEPHTHALITE/ HUNAS invasions			Shaka I (c. 325 – 345); Kipunada (c. 345 – 375)		GUPTA EMPIRE; Chandragupta I Samudragupta
388-395 CE	Rudrasimha III		Chandragupta II					
