= Diogeneia (festival) =

Ancient Greek festival

The Diogeneia (Ancient Greek: Διογένεια) was an ancient Greek festival celebrated in classical Athens.

The Diogeneia is believed to have been established after 229 BCE in honor of Diogenes of Macedonia, a benefactor of Athens, who was celebrated for his contributions to the city, and in later traditions, was viewed—like the legendary Aglauros—as a civic savior who played a role in the "liberation" of Athens.

The only known surviving details about this festival indicate that it was held at the Diogeneion, an ancient gymnasium, and was organized by the gymnasium’s youths (ephebes). Diogenes’ eldest male descendant was granted proedria, a seat of honor in the Athenian theater.

The festival had a primarily religious character. At the conclusion of the celebration, libations were poured and two bulls were sacrificed.

Despite these honors, the Diogeneia remained relatively modest in scope and appears to have been confined to the ephebic corps, without ever rising to the level of importance held by the major Athenian festivals.

== Bibliography ==
- Encyclopedia Papyros Larousse Britannica, Vol. 21, p. 103 (in Greek).
- Golden, Mark. Children and Childhood in Classical Athens. Berkeley: University of California Press, 1990. Chapter 6.
- Habicht, Christian. "Athens and the Attalids in the Second Century B.C." Hesperia 59, no. 1 (1990): 117–135. p. 120.
