= Zeionises =

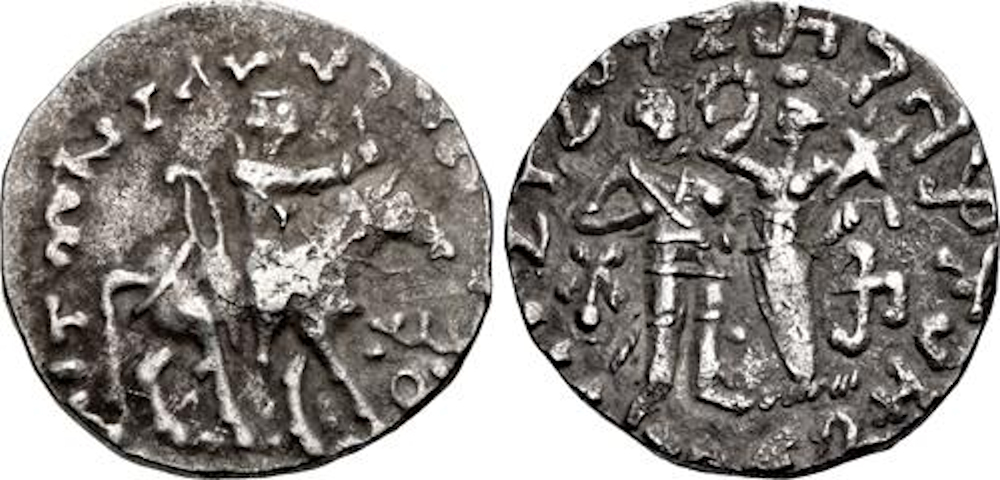
Coin of Zeionises (c. 10 BCE – 10 CE). Obv: King on horseback holding whip, with bow behind. Corrupted Greek legend MANNOLOU UIOU SATRAPY ZEIONISOU "Satrap Zeionises, son of Manigula". Buddhist Triratna symbol. Rev: King on the left, receiving a crown from a city goddess holding a cornucopia. Kharoshthi legend MANIGULASA CHATRAPASA PUTRASA CHATRAPASA JIHUNIASA "Satrap Zeionises, son of Satrap Manigul". South Chach mint.

Zeionises (Greek: Ζειονίσης Zeionísēs, ΖΕΙΟΝΙϹΟΥ Zeionisou (epigraphic); Kharosthi: 𐨗𐨁𐨱𐨂𐨣𐨁𐨀 Ji-hu-ni-a, Jihunia, 𐨗𐨁𐨱𐨆𐨞𐨁𐨐 Ji-ho-ṇi-ka, Jihoṇika;) was an Indo-Scythian satrap.

== Name ==
Zeionises's name appears on his coins in the Greek form Zeionísēs (Ζειονίσης) and the Kharosthi form Jihunia (𐨗𐨁𐨱𐨂𐨣𐨁𐨀), and on a silver vase from Taxila in the Kharosthi form Jihoṇika (𐨗𐨁𐨱𐨆𐨞𐨁𐨐), which are derived from Saka name *Jihonyaka, meaning "benefactor"

== Reign ==
Zeionises was a satrap of the area of southern Chach for King Azes II.

He then became king, and ruled in parts of the Indian subcontinent around 10 BCE – 10 CE, but apparently lost his territory to the invasion of the Indo-Parthians.

His coins bear the Buddhist Triratna symbol on the obverse, and adopt representations of Greek divinities such as the city goddess Tyche.

A silver jug found at Taxila indicates that Zeionises was the "satrap of Chuksa, son of Manigula, brother of the great king", but who this king was remains uncertain.

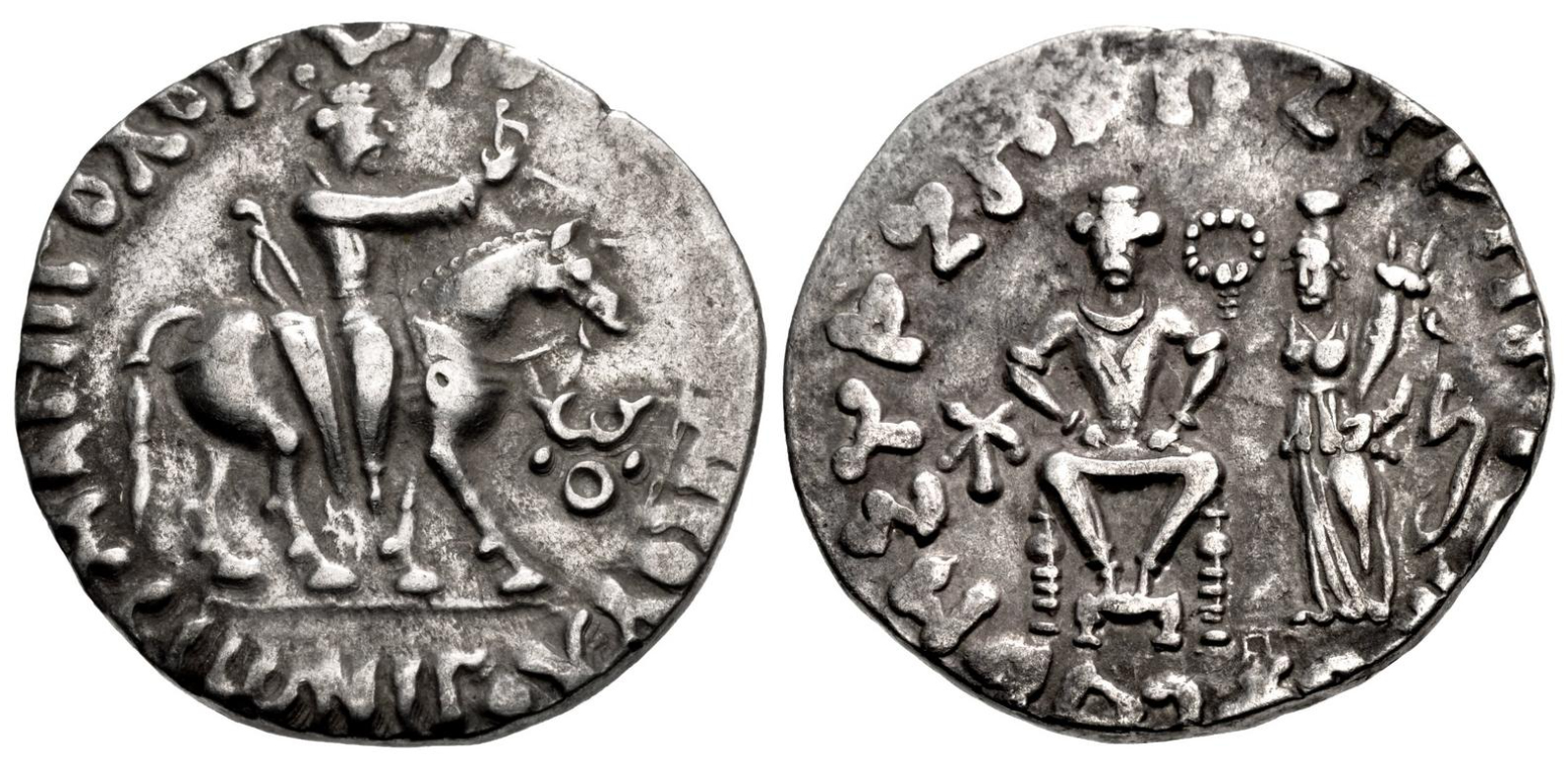
Indo-Scythian Zeionises. Circa 45-35 to 5 BCE. Uncertain mint in Chukhsa (Chach)

== See also ==
- Yuezhi
- Greco-Bactrian Kingdom
- Indo-Greek Kingdom
- Indo-Parthian Kingdom
- Kushan Empire

== Sources ==
- "The Shape of Ancient Thought. Comparative studies in Greek and Indian Philosophies" by Thomas McEvilley (Allworth Press and the School of Visual Arts, 2002) ISBN 1-58115-203-5
- "The Greeks in Bactria and India", W.W. Tarn, Cambridge University Press.

Preceded by Azes II	Indo-Scythian Ruler (c. 10 BCE – 10 CE)	Succeeded by Indo-Scythian satrap Kharahostes Kushan King: Heraios

Territories/ dates	Sindh	Western India	Western Pakistan Balochistan	Paropamisadae Arachosia	Bajaur	Gandhara	Western Punjab	Eastern Punjab	Mathura
450–90 BCE	Ror dynasty			INDO-GREEK KINGDOM					
90–85 BCE	Ror dynasty			Nicias	Menander II		Artemidoros		
90–70 BCE	Ror dynasty			Hermaeus	Archebius				
85-60 BCE	Ror dynasty			INDO-SCYTHIAN KINGDOM; Maues					
75–70 BCE	Ror dynasty			Vonones; Spalahores	Telephos		Apollodotus II		
65–55 BCE	Ror dynasty			Spalirises; Spalagadames			Hippostratos	Dionysios	
55–35 BCE	Ror dynasty			Azes I				Zoilos II	
55–35 BCE	Ror dynasty			Azilises; Azes II				Apollophanes	Indo-Scythian dynasty of the NORTHERN SATRAPS; Hagamasha
25 BCE – 10 CE	Ror dynasty				Indo-Scythian dynasty of the APRACHARAJAS; Vijayamitra (ruled 12 BCE - 15 CE) (Note: From the dated inscription on the Rukhana reliquary)	Liaka Kusulaka; Patika Kusulaka; Zeionises	Kharahostes (ruled 10 BCE– 10 CE) (Note: An Inscribed Silver Buddhist Reliquary of the Time of King Kharaosta and Prince Indravarman, Richard Salomon, Journal of the American Oriental Society, Vol. 116, No. 3 (Jul. - Sep., 1996), pp. 442); Mujatria	Strato II and Strato III	Hagana
10-20 CE	Ror dynasty		INDO-PARTHIAN KINGDOM; Gondophares		Indravasu	INDO-PARTHIAN KINGDOM; Gondophares		Rajuvula	
20-30 CE	Ror dynasty			Ubouzanes; Pakores	Vispavarma (ruled c.0-20 CE) (Note: A Kharosthī Reliquary Inscription of the Time of the Apraca Prince Visnuvarma, by Richard Salomon, South Asian Studies 11 1995, Pages 27-32, Published online: 09 Aug 2010)	Sarpedones		Bhadayasa	Sodasa
30-40 CE	Ror dynasty			KUSHAN EMPIRE; Kujula Kadphises	Indravarma	Abdagases		...	...
40-45 CE	Ror dynasty				Aspavarma	Gadana		...	...
45-50 CE	Ror dynasty				Sasan	Sases		...	...
50-75 CE	Ror dynasty							...	...
75-100 CE	Ror dynasty	Indo-Scythian dynasty of the WESTERN SATRAPS; Chastana		Vima Takto				...	...
100-120 CE	Ror dynasty	Abhiraka		Vima Kadphises				...	...
120 CE	Ror dynasty	Bhumaka; Nahapana	PARATARAJAS; Yolamira	Kanishka I				Great Satrap Kharapallana and Satrap Vanaspara for Kanishka I	
130-230 CE	Ror dynasty	Jayadaman; Rudradaman I Damajadasri I Jivadaman; Rudrasimha I Satyadaman; Jivadaman; Rudrasena I	Bagamira; Arjuna; Hvaramira; Mirahvara	Vāsishka (c. 140 – c. 160); Huvishka (c. 160 – c. 190); Vasudeva I (c. 190 – to at least 230)					
230-280 CE	Ror dynasty	Samghadaman; Damasena; Damajadasri II; Viradaman; Isvaradatta; Yasodaman I Vijayasena; Damajadasri III; Rudrasena II; Visvasimha	Miratakhma; Kozana; Bhimarjuna; Koziya; Datarvharna; Datarvharna	INDO-SASANIANS; Ardashir I, Sassanid king and "Kushanshah" (c. 230 – 250); Peroz I, "Kushanshah" (c. 250 – 265); Hormizd I, "Kushanshah" (c. 265 – 295)			Kanishka II (c. 230 – 240); Vashishka (c. 240 – 250); Kanishka III (c. 250 – 275)		
280-300 CE	Ror dynasty	Bhratadarman	Datayola II	Hormizd II, "Kushanshah" (c. 295 – 300)			Vasudeva II (c. 275 – 310)		
300-320 CE	Ror dynasty	Visvasena; Rudrasimha II; Jivadaman		Peroz II, "Kushanshah" (c. 300 – 325)			Vasudeva III; Vasudeva IV; Vasudeva V Chhu (c. 310? – 325)		
320-388 CE	Ror dynasty	Yasodaman II; Rudradaman II; Rudrasena III; Simhasena; Rudrasena IV		Shapur II Sassanid king and "Kushanshah" (c. 325); Varhran I, Varhran II, Varhran III "Kushanshahs" (c. 325 – 350); Peroz III "Kushanshah" (c. 350 –360); HEPHTHALITE/ HUNAS invasions			Shaka I (c. 325 – 345); Kipunada (c. 345 – 375)		GUPTA EMPIRE; Chandragupta I Samudragupta
388-395 CE	Ror dynasty	Rudrasimha III		Chandragupta II					
