= Diogenes (Macedonian commander) =

Ancient Greek garrison commander

Diogenes was the Macedonian commander of the Antigonid garrison in Piraeus in the third quarter of the third century BC.

In 229 BC, he abandoned the garrison and returned Piraeus to the Athenians in exchange for a payment of 150 talents, making Athens free from foreign military occupation for the first time in 65 years.

He was honoured extensively for this action, as a "benefactor" (euergetes) of the city. A festival, the Diogeneia (Διογένεια), and a gymnasium, the Diogeneion (Διογένειον), were set up in his honor. One of the thrones in the Theater of Dionysos was reserved for him and a dipinto painted on an early Roman amphora may record a priest dedicated to a hero cult for him.
