= Diógenes (footballer, born 1937) =

Brazilian footballer (1937–2004)

Personal information
- Full name: Diógenes José da Silva
- Date of birth: 21 July 1937
- Place of birth: Olímpia, Brazil
- Date of death: 9 August 2004 (aged 67)
- Place of death: Olímpia, Brazil
- Position: Defender

Senior career*
Years	Team	Apps	(Gls)
–1957	Olímpia		
1957	Corinthians		
1957–1958	São Paulo	24	(0)
1959–1961	Comercial-SP		
1961–1971	Juventus-SP	149	(0)
- * Club domestic league appearances and goals

Diógenes José da Silva (21 July 1937 – 9 August 2004), simply known as Diógenes, was a Brazilian professional footballer who played as a defender.

== Career ==
Defender, Diógenes played for CA Juventus for 10 years, making 149 appearances in total. He was called "Djalma Santos da Mooca".

== Honours ==
São Paulo

- Campeonato Paulista: 1957
