= Diogenes of Tarsus =

Diogenes of Tarsus (Ancient Greek: Διογένης ὁ Ταρσεύς; fl. 2nd century BC) was an Epicurean philosopher, who is described by Strabo as a person clever in composing improvised tragedies. He was the author of several works, which, however, are lost. Among them are:

- Select lectures (Greek: Ἐπίλεκτοι σχολαί), which was probably a collection of essays and dissertations.
- Epitome of Epicurus’ ethical doctrines (Greek: ἐπιτομὴ τῶν Ἐρικούρου ἠθικῶν ζητημάτων), of which Diogenes Laërtius quotes the 12th book.
- On poetical problems (Greek: Περὶ ποιητικῶν ζητμάτων), poetical problems which he endeavoured to solve, and which seem to have had special reference to the Homeric poems.
