= Diogenes of Judea =

Diogenes was a soldier in the service of the Hasmonean king Alexander Jannaeus (103-76 BCE). He appears in Josephus's work Antiquities of the Jews. In revenge for the support of certain Pharisees for Demetrius III of Syria's invasion of Judea, Diogenes advised Alexander to crucify 800 Pharisee scholars and murder their families before their eyes. Graetz and others, using 5 Maccabees as their source, identified Diogenes as a Sadducee.

Following Alexander's death, his widow and successor Salome Alexandra, probably at the urging of her brother Simeon ben Shetach, had Diogenes put to death.

Diogenes may be the Greek name adopted by the Sadducee Elazar Ben Po’ira, who the Talmud (Kiddushin 66a) relates turned Alexander’s heart against the Pharisees.
