= Diogenes of Seleucia =

Diogenes of Seleucia (Ancient Greek: Διογένης; fl. 2nd century BC) was an Epicurean philosopher, who has sometimes been confused with Diogenes of Babylon, who was also a native of Seleucia on the Tigris. He lived at the court of Syria, and was friends with king Alexander Balas, the supposed son of Antiochus Epiphanes. Athenaeus relates that Diogenes asked the king for a golden crown and a purple robe so that he could represent himself as the priest of Virtue. The king, apparently, agreed, but Diogenes subsequently gave the crown and robe to a female singer he was in love with, and the king hearing of this, summoned the girl to a banquet wearing the robe and crown, to the general mirth of the other guests.

After Alexander was pushed off the throne c. 146 BC, Diogenes was put to death, because "Antiochus, who succeeded Alexander in the kingdom, could not tolerate the abusive language of this Diogenes."
