= Diogenes of Cappadocia =

Diogenes was a person sent by Orophernes, usurper of Cappadocia, together with Timotheus, as ambassador to Rome in 157 BC, to carry to Rome a golden crown, and to renew the friendship and alliance with the Roman Republic. The principal object of the ambassadors, however, was to support the accusation which was brought against the deposed king Ariarathes V; and Diogenes and his coadjutor, Miltiades, succeeded in their plan, and lies and calumnies gained the victory, as there was no one to undertake the defence of Ariarathes.
