= Diogenes of Athens (sculptor) =

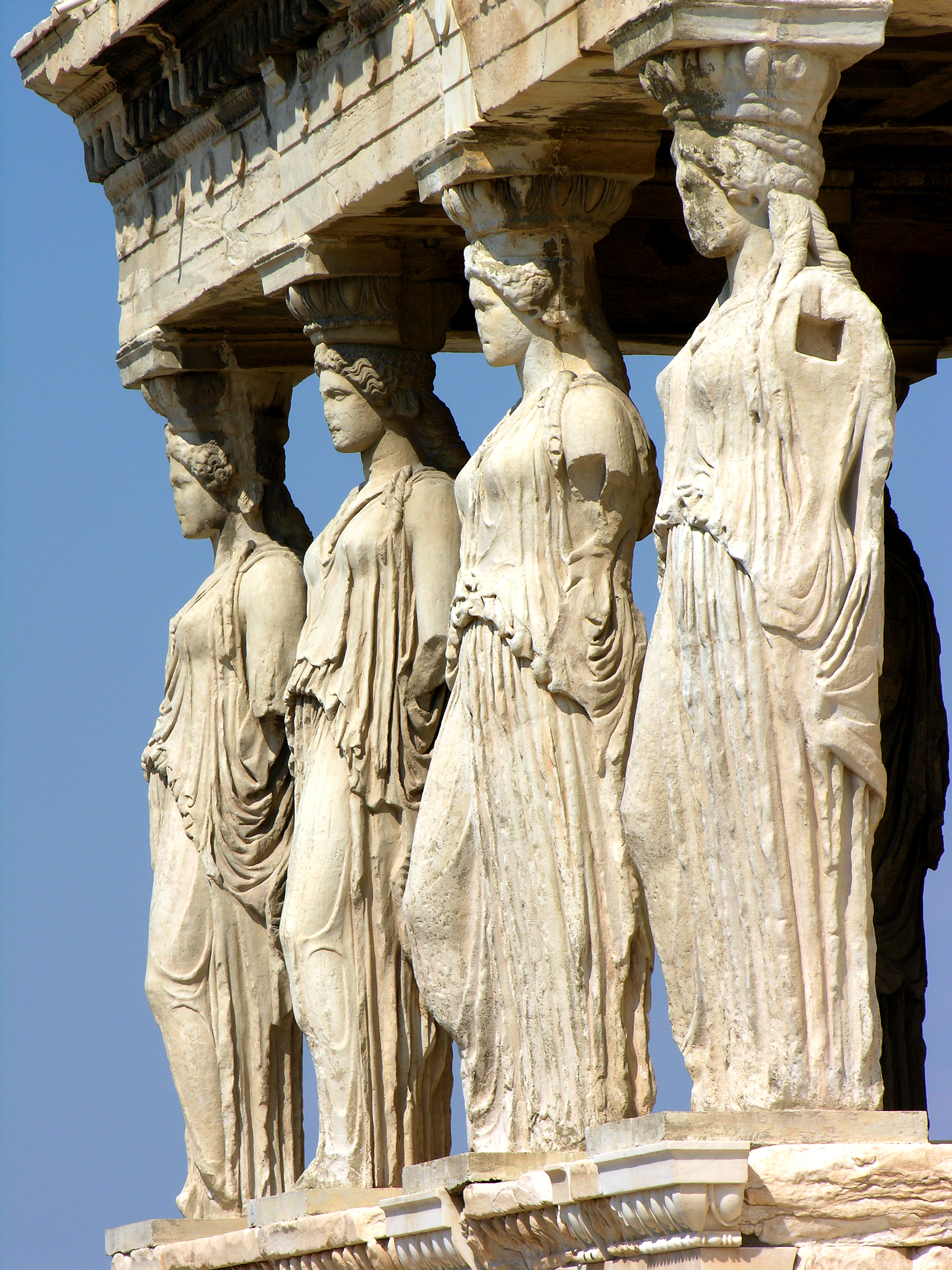
Caryatids of the Erechtheion in Athens, possible models for those of Diogenes for the Pantheon in Rome

Diogenes of Athens (Ancient Greek: Διογένης ὁ Ἀθηναῖος; Latin: Diogenes Atheniensis) was a sculptor who worked at Rome during the reign of Augustus.

According to Pliny, Diogenes was commissioned by Marcus Agrippa to embellish the exterior of the Pantheon. His caryatids were considered exceptionally fine, and were probably visible in the pronaos of the temple. Given Roman taste in the Augustan period, the caryatids could have been copied from the graceful female figures familiar to Diogenes at Athens. Plaster casts of the caryatids of the Erechtheion existed in Rome at the time, and were conceivably by Diogenes.

Agrippa's temple was mostly demolished after suffering two fires, and was rebuilt under Hadrian. In the 7th century, the Pantheon was converted for use as a Christian house of worship, and Diogenes' sculptures have either not survived or not been identified as such. Nothing is known for certain about his work beyond Pliny's remark, but it may have resembled fragmentary caryatids recovered from the Forum of Augustus and Hadrian's Villa. Some art historians of the 18th and 19th centuries, including Winckelmann, tentatively attributed fragments to him. Winckelmann conjectured that an atlantid (the male version of a caryatid), formerly at the Palazzo Farnese, was the work of Diogenes.

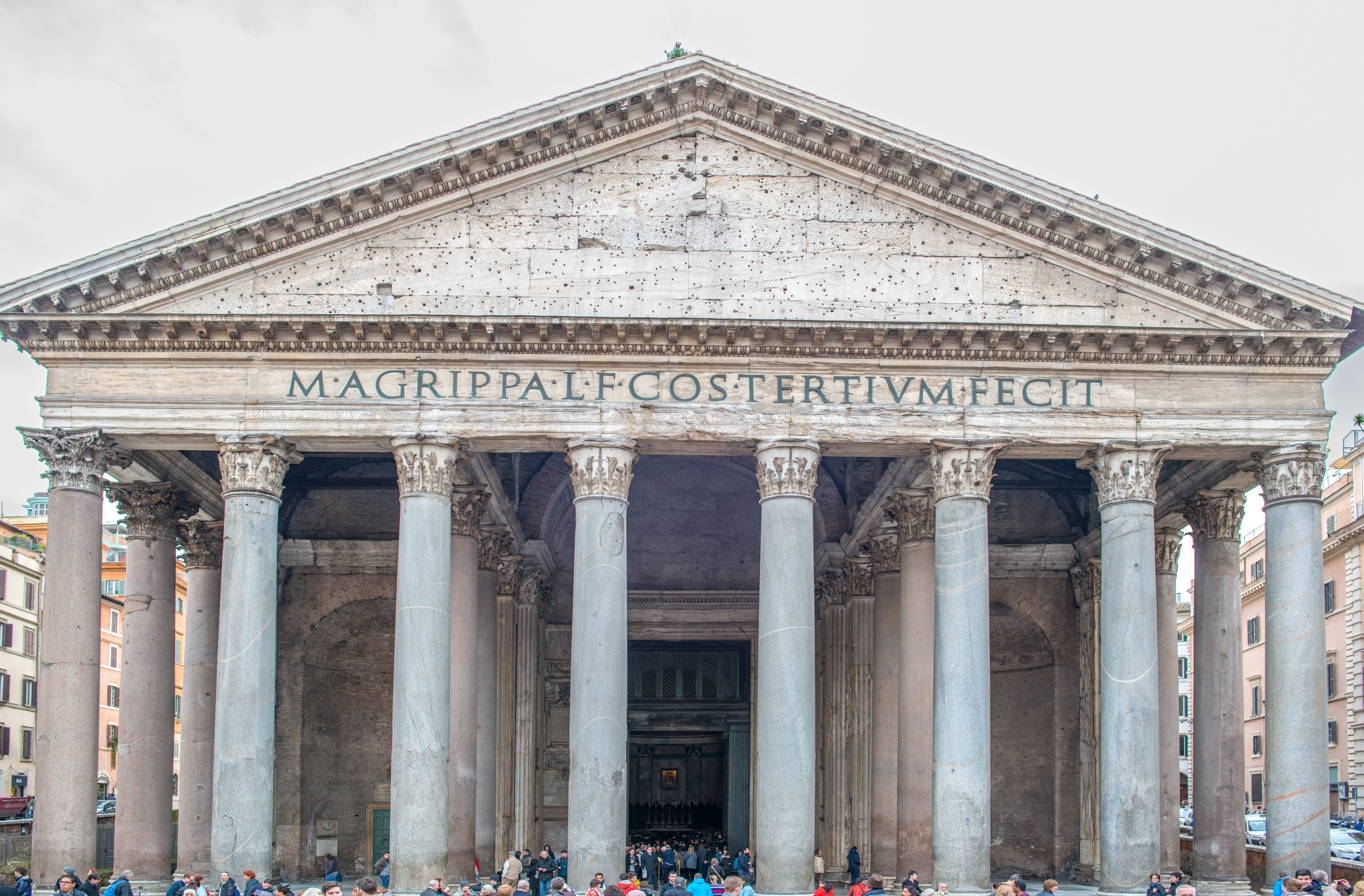
Inscription recording the patronage of Agrippa in building the Pantheon, below the unembellished pediment.

Diogenes also created sculpture for the Pantheon's pediment, of equally fine quality, but lesser known, Pliny remarks, because the structure's great height made this work difficult to see.
