= Diogenes of Athens (tragedian) =

Writer of Greek tragedy in the late 5th or early 4th century BC

Diogenes of Athens (Ancient Greek: Διογένης ὁ Ἀθηναῖος) was a writer of Greek tragedy in the late 5th or early 4th century BC. His works are listed by the Suda as Semele, Achilles, Helen, Herakles, Thyestes, Medea, Oedipus, and Chrysippus. He was either born or flourished at the time of the Thirty Tyrants and the suppression of Athenian democracy, around 404–403 BC.

This Diogenes is sometimes confused with Diogenes of Sinope, to whom a similar list of tragedies is attributed by Diogenes Laërtius.

Athenaeus preserves a geographically confused fragment from Diogenes, having to do with a laurel grove along the Halys river where Lydian and Bactrian girls perform sacred music for Artemis as the goddess of Mount Tmolus.
