= Mitra dynasty (Mathura) =

Indian dynasty

- 150 BCE–50 BCE
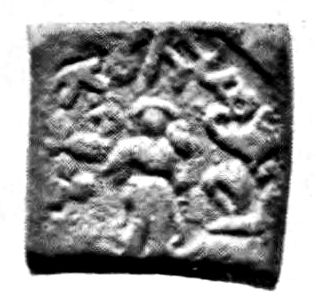
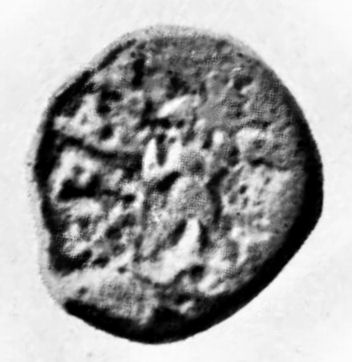
- Left image: Coin of Gomitra of Mathura (reverse): Standing figure with symbols around, probably goddess Lakshmi. Inscription Gomitasa in Brahmi. Right image: Coin of Brahmamitra (reverse): Standing figure with raised arm, probably Lakshmi holding a lotus, surrounded by symbols. Legend Brahmamitasa in Brahmi.

- Capital: Mathura
- History
  - Established: 150 BCE
  - Conquest of Mathura and Saketa by the Northern Satraps around 60 BCE: 50 BCE
Preceded by	Succeeded by
Datta dynasty	Northern Satraps; Indo-Scythians
- Today part of: India

The Mitra dynasty refers to a group of local rulers whose name incorporated the suffix "-mitra" and who are thought to have ruled in the area of Mathura from around 150 BCE to 50 BCE, at the time of Indo-Greek hegemony over the region, and possibly in a tributary relationship with them. They are not known to have been satraps nor kings, and their coins only bear their name without any title, therefore they are sometimes simply called "the Mitra rulers of Mathura". Alternatively, they have been dated from 100 BCE to 20 BCE. The Mitra dynasty was replaced by the Indo-Scythian Northern Satraps from around 60 BCE.

Some sources consider that the Mitra dynasty ruled at a later date, during the 1st or 2nd century CE, and that they ruled from Mathura to Saketa, where they replaced the Deva dynasty.

In addition to the Mitra dynasties of Saketa (Kosala kingdom) and Mathura, there were Mitra dynasties in Ahichchhatra (Panchala kingdom) and Kaushambi (Vatsa kingdom). During the 1st century BCE to 2nd century CE, the Mitras of Kaushambi also appear to have extended their hegemony over Magadha (including Pataliputra), and possibly Kannauj as well.

== Rulers ==
Seven rulers of Mathura are known:

- Gomitra
- Gomitra II
- Brahmamitra
- Dridhamitra
- Suryamitra
- Vishnumitra
- Satyamitra

These rulers are never mentioned as "Kings" or Raja on their coins: there is therefore a possibility that they may only have been local rulers and vassals to larger king. Gomitra II and Brahmamitra especially are known for their large number of coins, which is not so much the case for other rulers.

In the archaeological excavations of Sonkh, near Mathura, archaeological levels of the Mitra rulers were identified.

Coins of the Mitra dynasty were found in Sonkh especially, in layers dated to about 150–50 BCE. The earliest Mitra coins are those of Gomitra (150–50 BCE).

== Relation with the Indo-Greeks ==
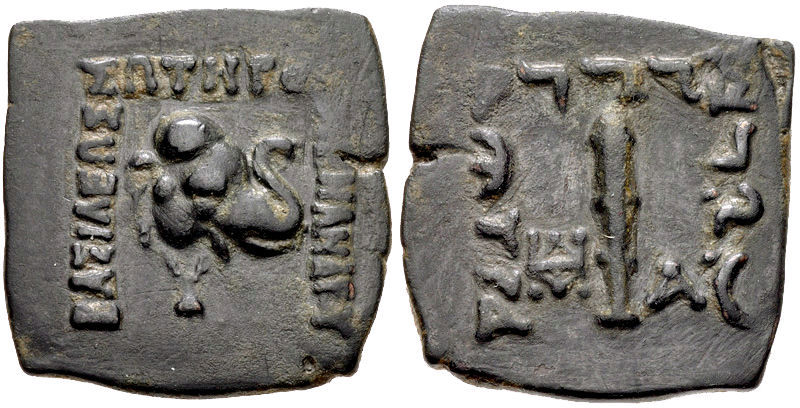
Coin of Menander I with elephant and Heraklian club.

From numismatic, literary and epigraphic evidence, it seems that the Indo-Greeks had control over Mathura at some time, especially during the rule of Menander I (165–135 BCE). The control of Mathura seems to have continued for some time under the successors of Menander, with Strato I, Antimachus and Apollodotus II, where they were facing the territory of the Sungas. Coins of Menander and Strato can be found in the area of Mathura, and Ptolemy records Menander as having ruled as far as Mathura (Μόδουρα) in Book VII, I, 47 of his Geographia. An inscription in Mathura discovered in 1988 mentions "The last day of year 116 of Yavana hegemony (Yavanarajya)", also attesting presence of the Indo-Greeks in the 2nd century BCE. The inscription would date to the 116th year of the Yavana era (thought to start in 186–185 BCE) which would give it a date of 70 or 69 BCE. The Yavanarajya inscription reads:

The Yavanarajya inscription, dated to "year 116 of Yavana hegemony", probably 70 or 69 BCE. Mathura Museum.

On this day, the year one hundred sixteen, 116, of the Yavana kingdom, in the fourth month of winter on the thirtieth day...
[This is] the well and tank of Ahogani, the mother of the merchant Virabala, who was the son of Ghosadatta, a brahmin of the Maitreya clan, with [her] son Virabala, daughter-in-law Bhaguri, and grandsons Suradatta, Rsabhadeva, and Viraddata.

May (their) merit increase

— Mathura Yavanarajya inscription.

The Indo-Greeks may have been supplanted by Indo-Scythians around that date, who would then rule in Mathura as the Northern Satraps.

From this time also (circa 150 BCE), archaeological research at Mathura reports an important growth of the city and extensive building of fortifications. Stone sculptures in Mathura are also known from this period onwards, although Indo-Greek artistic influence cannot be readily seen.

Given the suggestions of Greek presence and control concomitantly with the rule of the Mitra dynasty in the same time frame (150–50 BCE), it is therefore thought that there may have been a sort of tributary relationship between the Mitra dynasty and the Indo-Greeks to the west. Numerous coins of Rajuvula have been found in company with the coins of the Strato group in the Eastern Punjab (to the east of the Jhelum) and also in the Mathura area.

== Shungas to the east ==
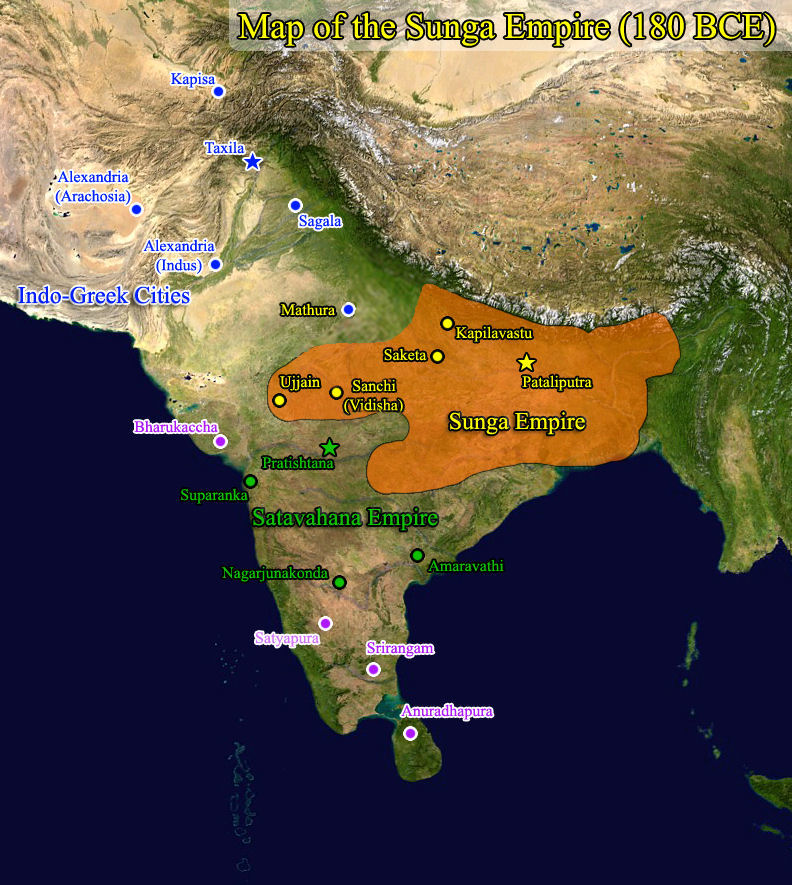
It is thought that the Shungas did not rule in Mathura.

The period in which the Mitra dynasty ruled in Mathura roughly corresponds to the Hindu Sunga dynasty (180 BCE–80 BCE); however, it doesn't seem that the Shungas ruled in Mathura or Surasena since no Shunga coins or inscriptions have been found there.

The Mitra dynasty was replaced by the Indo-Scythian Northern Satraps around 60 BCE.

== "Datta" rulers of Mathura ==
Another dynasty of local rulers, named the "Datta kings" is also known to have ruled in Mathura. These rulers are known as Seshadatta, Ramadatta, Sisuchandradatta and Sivadatta. The coins of Ramadatta usually represent a Lakshmi standing, and facing elephants. It is thought that they came just before, and were replaced by the Mitra dynasty.
