= Datta dynasty =

Ancient Indian dynasty

Dattas of Mathura
- 1st century BCE–1st century BCE
- Capital: Mathura
- Religion: Hinduism
- Government: Monarchy
- History
  - Established: 1st century BCE
  - Disestablished: 1st century BCE
Preceded by
Deva dynasty
Indo-Greeks
Succeeded by
Mitra dynasty
Northern Satraps
Scythian Empire
- Today part of: India

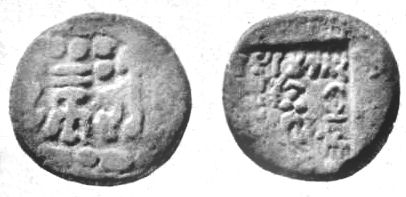
Coin of Ramadatta. Obv. Elephant facing. Rev. Standing figure with symbols.

Location of the Datta dynasty in Mathura, India.

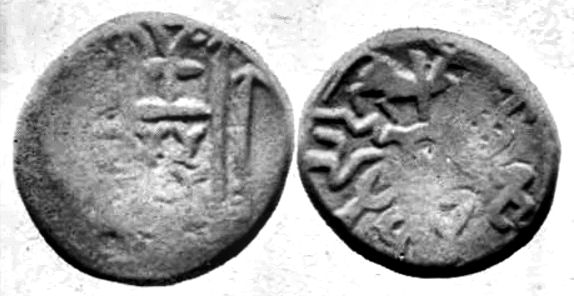
Coin of Sivadatta, minted in Almora. Obv: railing with symbol between the posts. Obv: Sivadatasa, uncertain central symbol, margin: deer and tree within railing.

The Datta dynasty is a dynasty of rulers who flourished in the northern India in the areas of Mathura and Ayodhya around the 1st century BCE – 1st century CE. They are named after the "-datta" ending of their name, and essentially only known through their coins. It is thought that they replaced the Deva dynasty, which had originated with the rise of Sunga Empire Pushyamitra, and that they were in turn replaced by the Mitra dynasty.

The known Datta rulers are:

- Seshadatta
- Ramadatta
- Sisuchandradatta
- Sivadatta.

The coins of Ramadatta usually represent a Lakshmi standing, and facing elephants. In the archaeological excavations of Sonkh, near Mathura, the earliest coins of the Northern Satraps level were those of Hagamasha and Ramadatta.

The Datta rulers are never mentioned as "king" or Raja on their coins, suggesting that they may only have been local rulers subservient to another king. Since the Indo-Greeks were in control of Mathura around the same time frame (150–50 BCE) according to the Yavanarajya inscription, it is thought that there may have been a sort of tributary relationship between the local Datta or Mitra dynasty and the Indo-Greek kings. Alternatively, the Datta and Mitra dynasties of rulers may simply have replaced Indo-Greek rule in the region, before the advent of the Indo-Scythian Northern Satraps and then the Kushans.

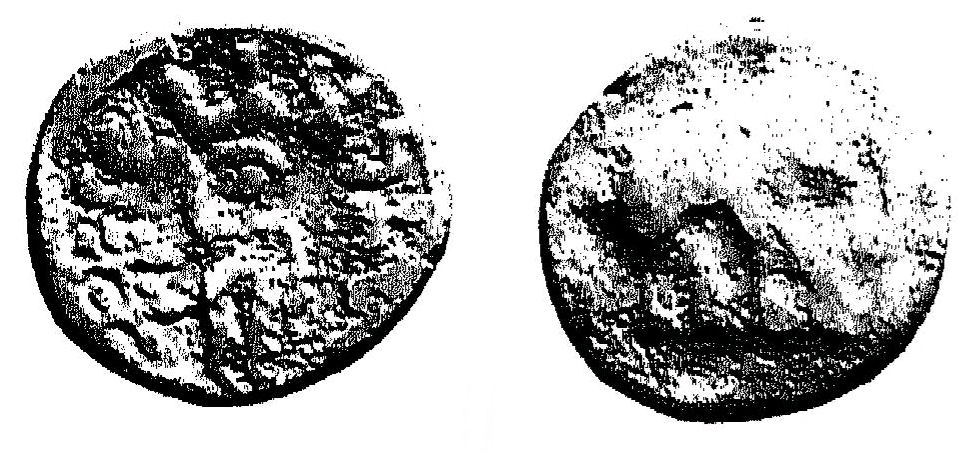
Coin of Uttamadatta.

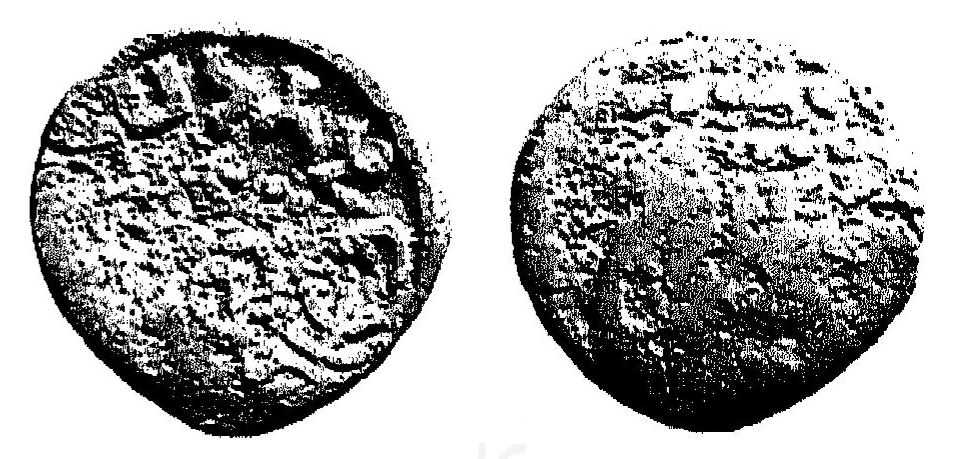
Coin of Purushadatta.

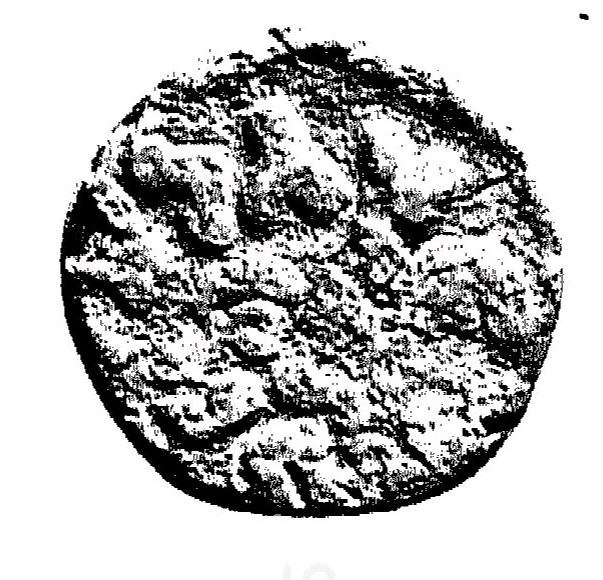
Coin of Ramadatta.
