= Loriyan Tangai =

Archaeological site in Gandhara, Pakistan

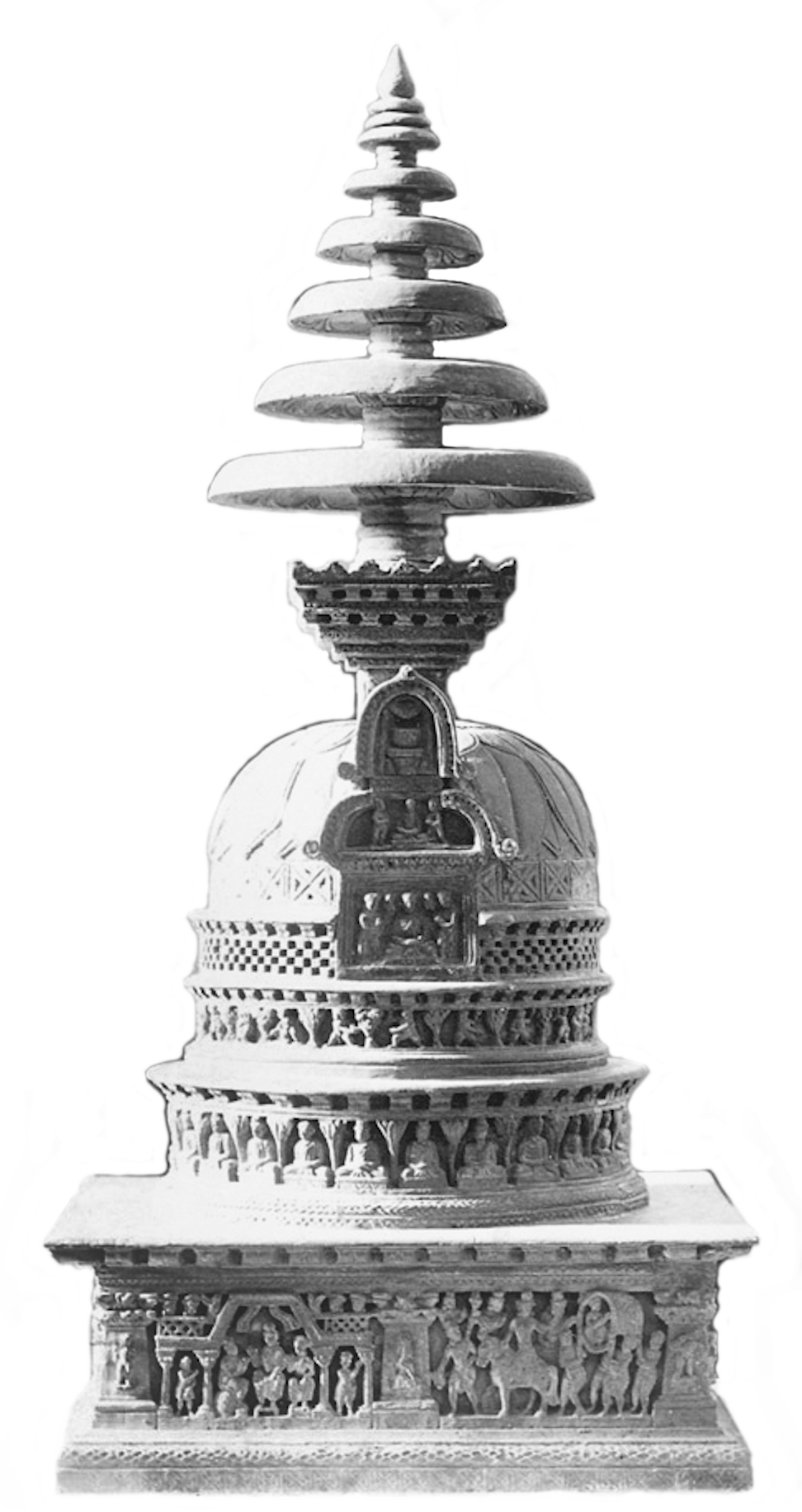
- A Loriyan Tangai Stupa (reenactment).

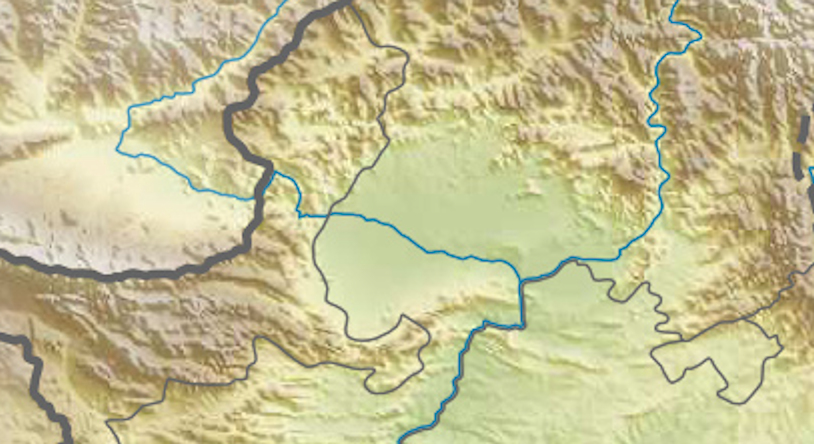
- Location within Pakistan Location within Gandhara

Religion
- Affiliation: Buddhism
- Region: Gandhara
- Ecclesiastical or organisational status: Stupa ruins
- Year consecrated: 2nd century CE
- Status: Artifacts removed

Location
- Location: Pakistan
- Coordinates: 34.5344°N 71.8711°E

Loriyan Tangai (also spelled Lauriyan, Tangai) is an archaeological site in the Gandhara area of Pakistan, consisting of many stupas and religious buildings where many Buddhist statues were discovered.

The stupas were excavated by Alexander Caddy in 1896, and the many statues of the site sent to the Indian Museum of Calcutta.

== Buddha "of the year 318" ==
One of the statues of the Buddha from Loriyan Tangai has an inscription mentioning "the year 318". The era in question is not specified, but it is now thought, following the discovery of the Bajaur reliquary inscription, that it is about the Yavana era beginning in 174 BCE, and gives a date for the Buddha statue of about 143 CE.

The inscription at the base of the statue is:

Inscription of the Buddha of Loriyan Tangai
Inscription	Original (Kharosthi script)	Transliteration	English translation
Line 1	𐨯 𐩀 𐩀 𐩀 𐩆 𐩄 𐩃 𐩃 𐨤𐨿𐨪𐨆𐨛𐨬𐨡𐨯 𐨡𐨁 𐩅 𐩃 𐩀 𐩀 𐩀 𐨦𐨂𐨢𐨓𐨮𐨯 𐨡𐨞𐨨𐨂𐨑𐨅	Sa 1 1 1 100 10 4 4 Proṭhavadasa di 20 4 1 1 1 Budhaghoṣasa daṇamukhe	In year 318, the day 27 of Prausthapada, gift of Buddhaghosa,
Line 2	𐨯𐨓𐨆𐨪𐨂𐨨𐨯 𐨯𐨡𐨬𐨁𐨩𐨪𐨁𐨯	Saghorumasa sadaviyarisa	the companion of Saṃghavarma

Loriya Tangai Buddha
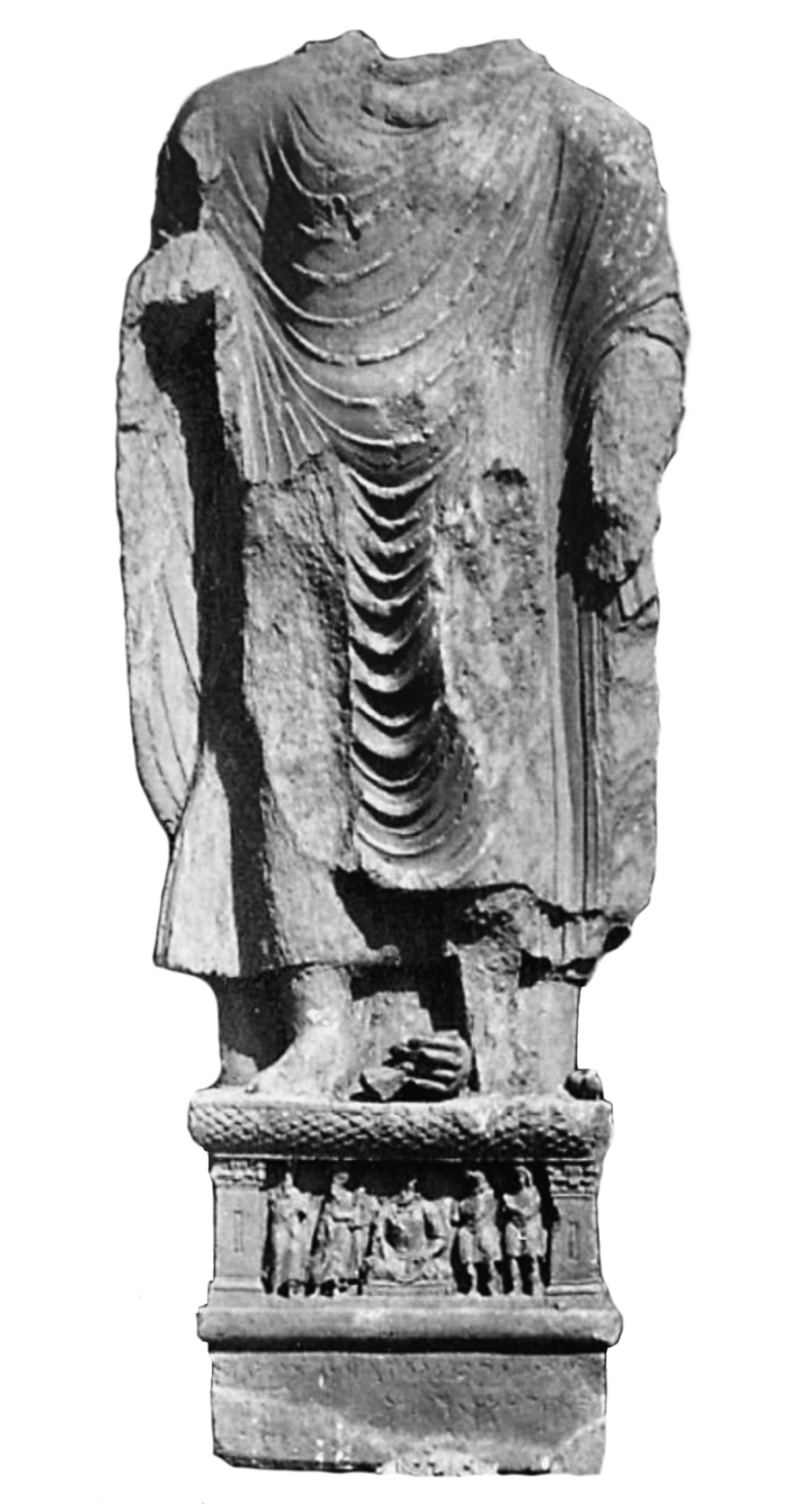
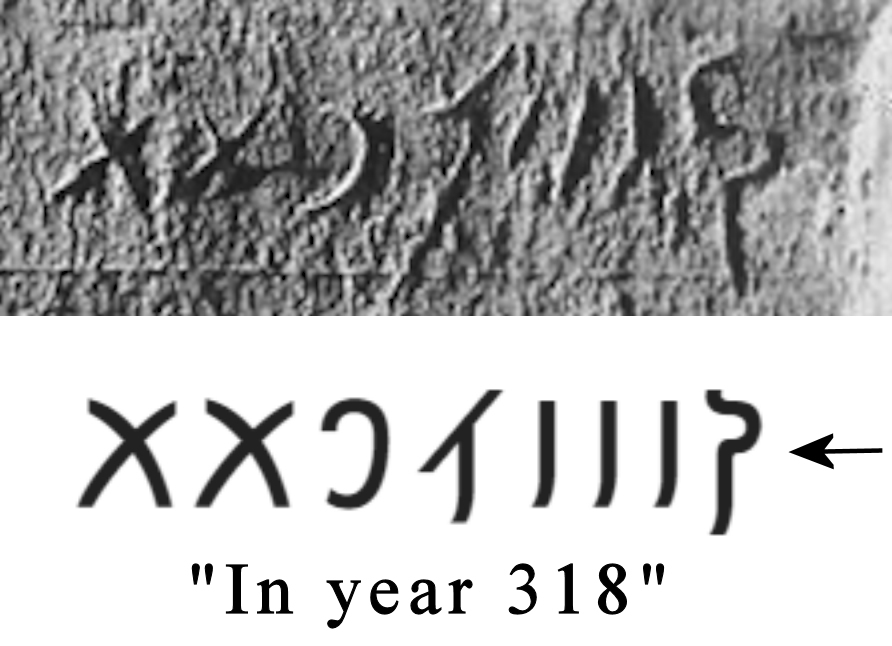
Statue with inscription mentioning "year 318", probably 143 CE.

This would make it one of the earliest known representations of the Buddha, after the Bimaran casket (1st century CE), and at about the same time as the Buddhist coins of Kanishka.

The two devotees on the right side of the pedestal are in Indo-Scythian suit (loose trousers, tunic, and hood). Their characteristic trousers appear clearly on close-up pictures. The statue is now in Indian Museum of Calcutta.

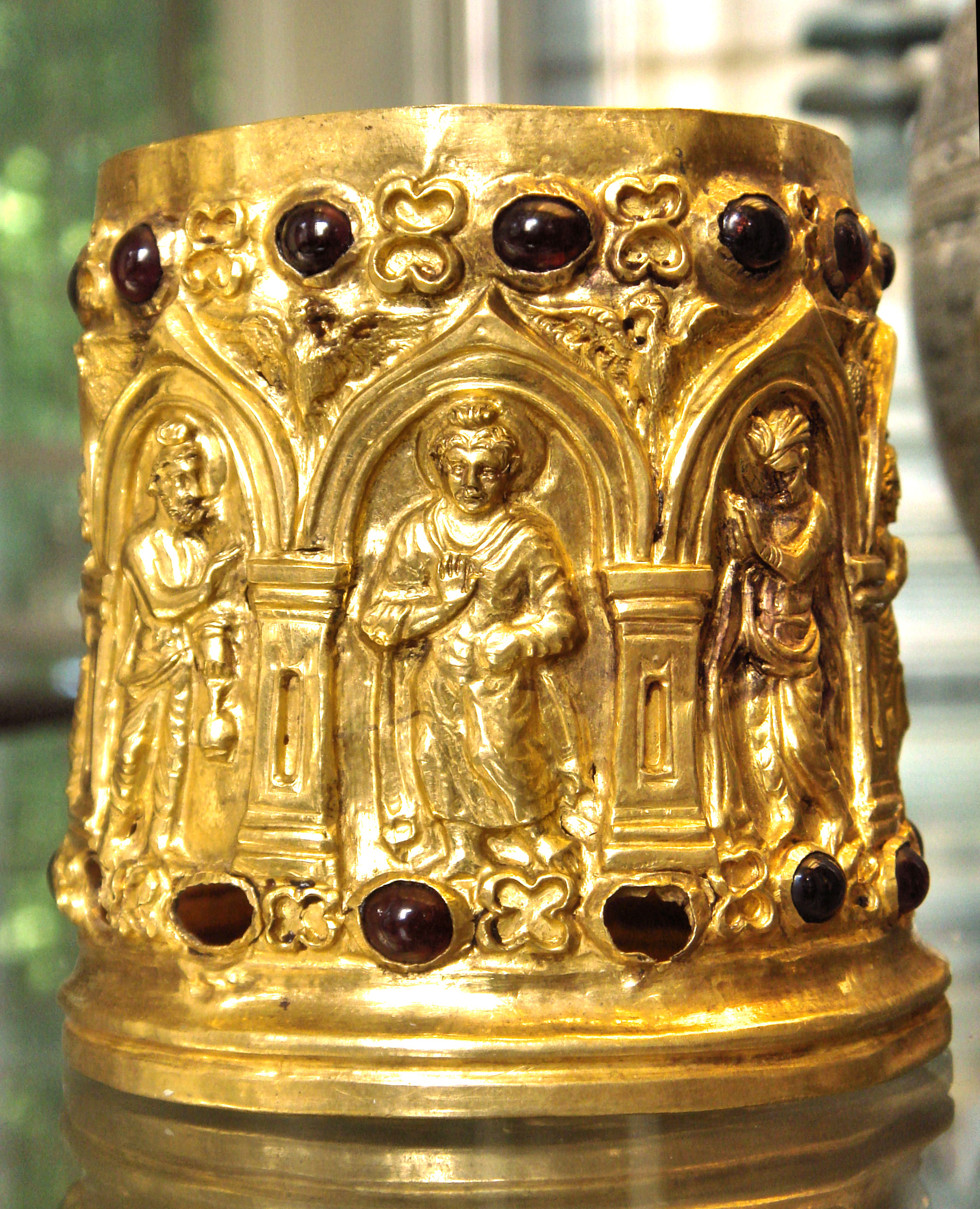
Bimaran casket (1st century CE)

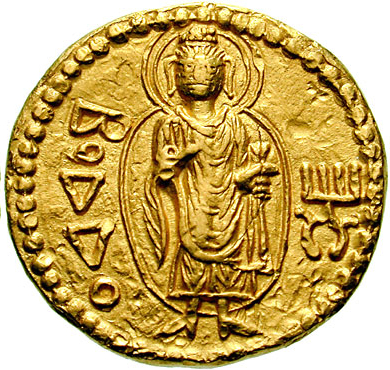
The Buddha (with "BODDO" in Greek script) on a coin of Kanishka (approx. 130 CE)

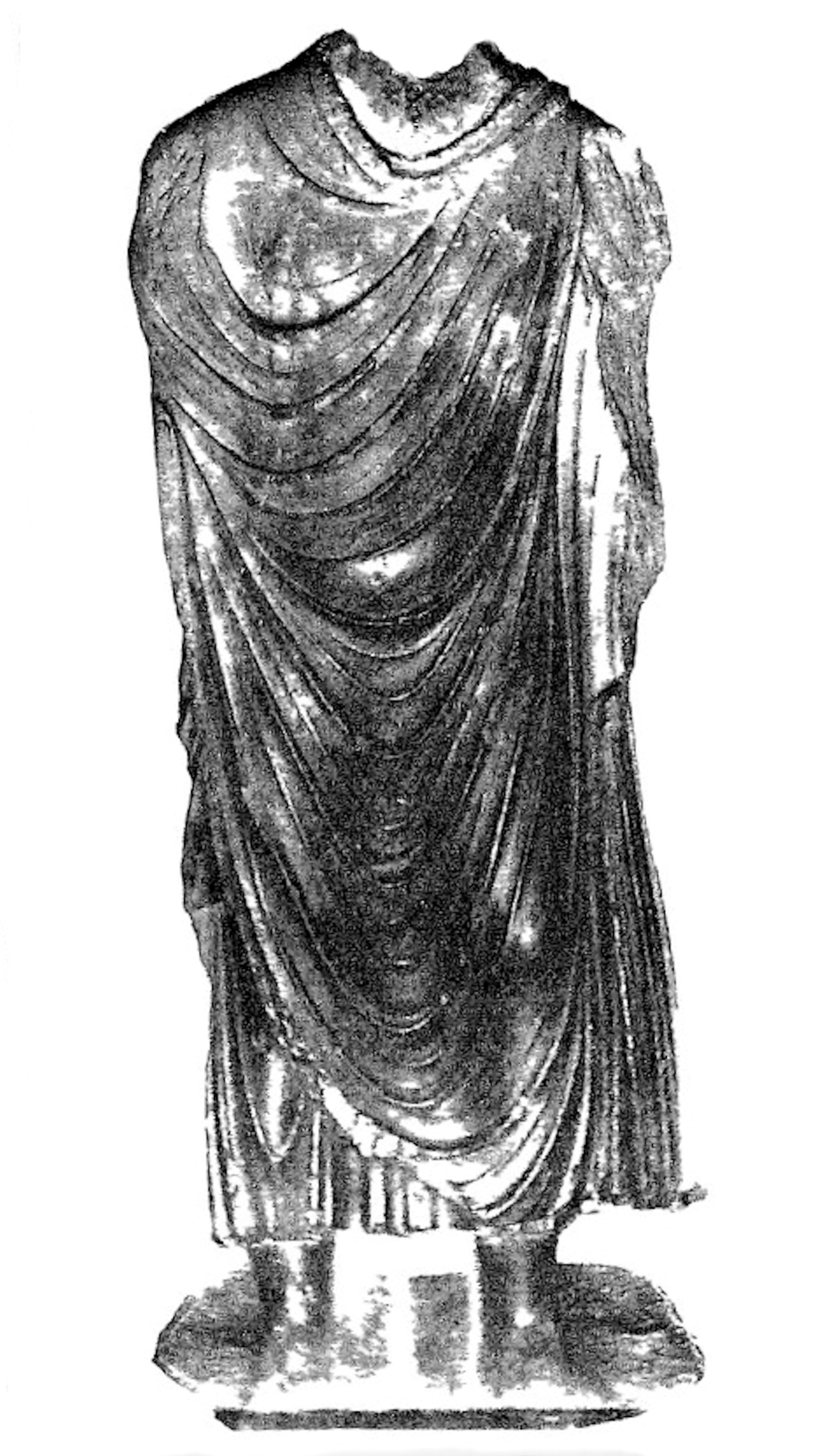
Statue of the Buddha of Hashtnagar, inscribed of "the year 384", which is thought to be 209 CE.

Another statue of Buddha, the Buddha of Hashtnagar, is inscribed from the year 384, which is thought to be 209 CE. Only the pedestal is preserved in the British Museum, the statue itself, with folds of clothing having more relief than those of the Loriyan Tangai Buddha, having disappeared.

== Gallery ==
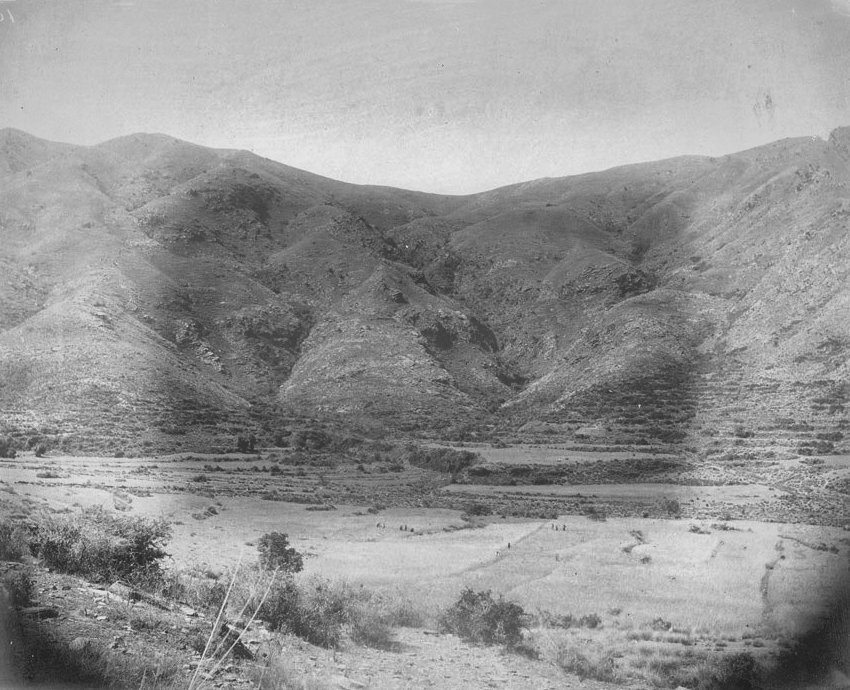
Loriyan Tangai valley

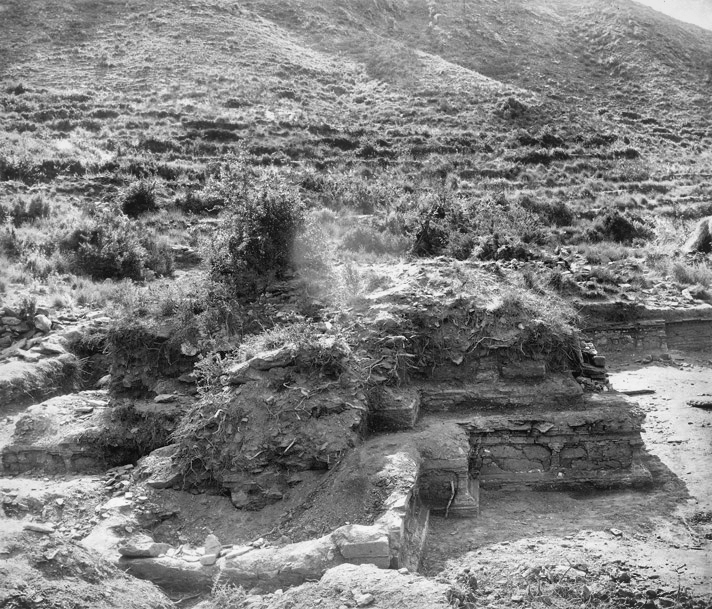
A Loriyan Tangai Stupa after excavation.

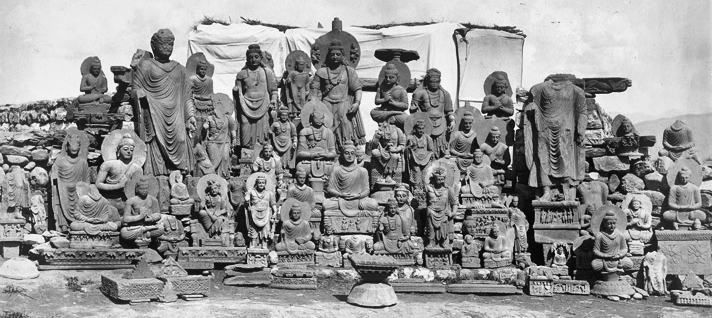
Buddhas and Bodhisattvas.

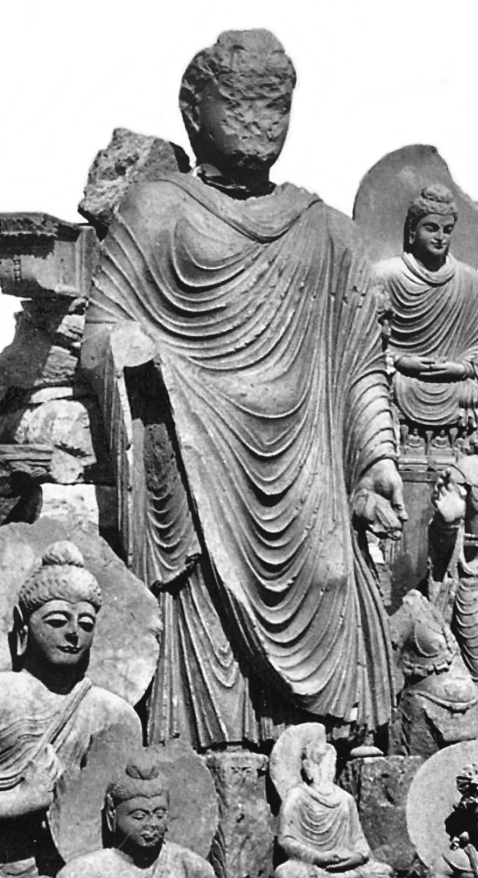
A Loriyan Tangai Buddha from the same period as the Buddha dated "Year 318".

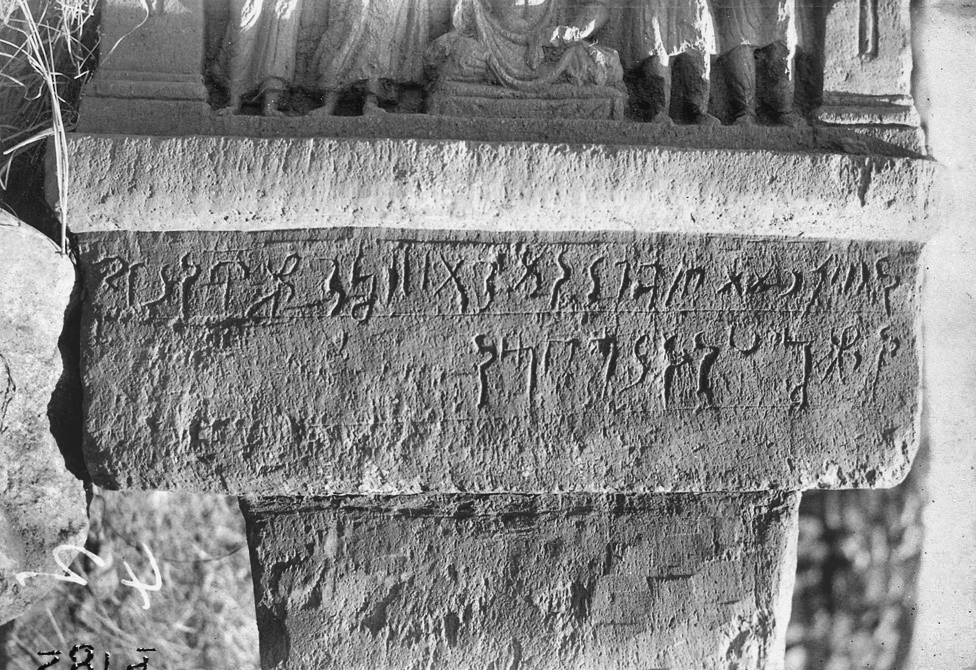
Dated inscription (318) of the Loriyan Tangai Buddha.

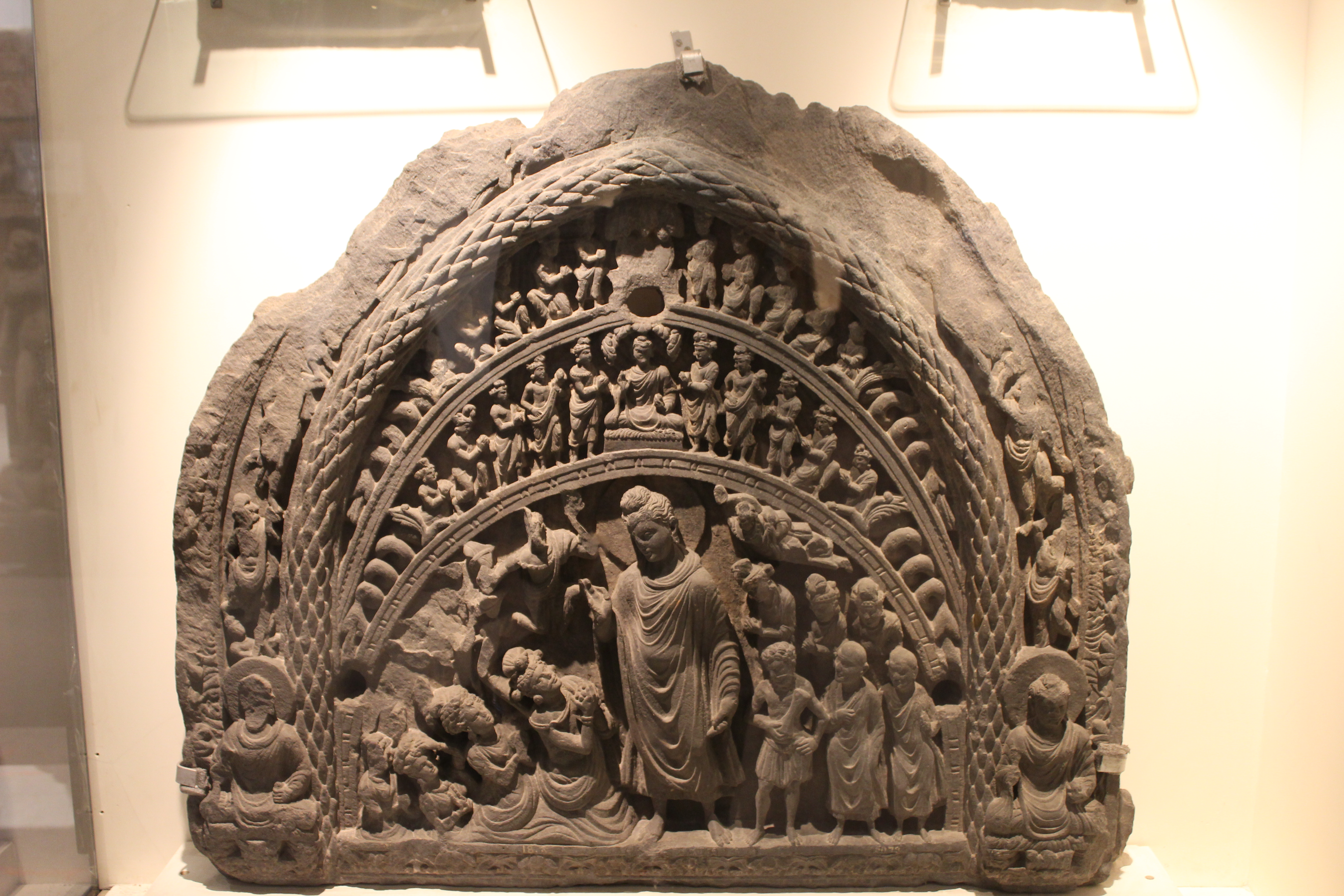
Loriyan Tangai sculpture

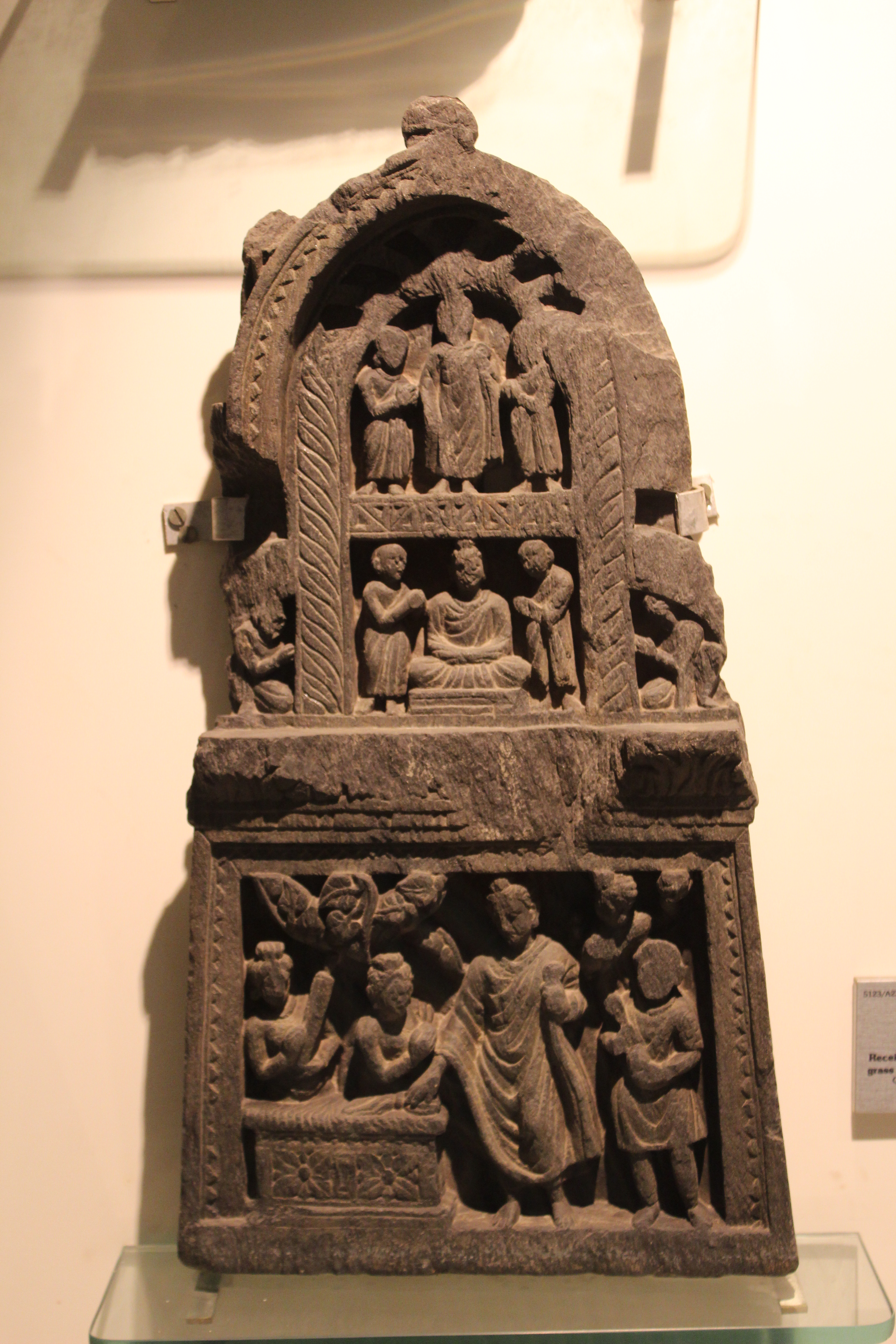
Loriyan Tangai sculpture

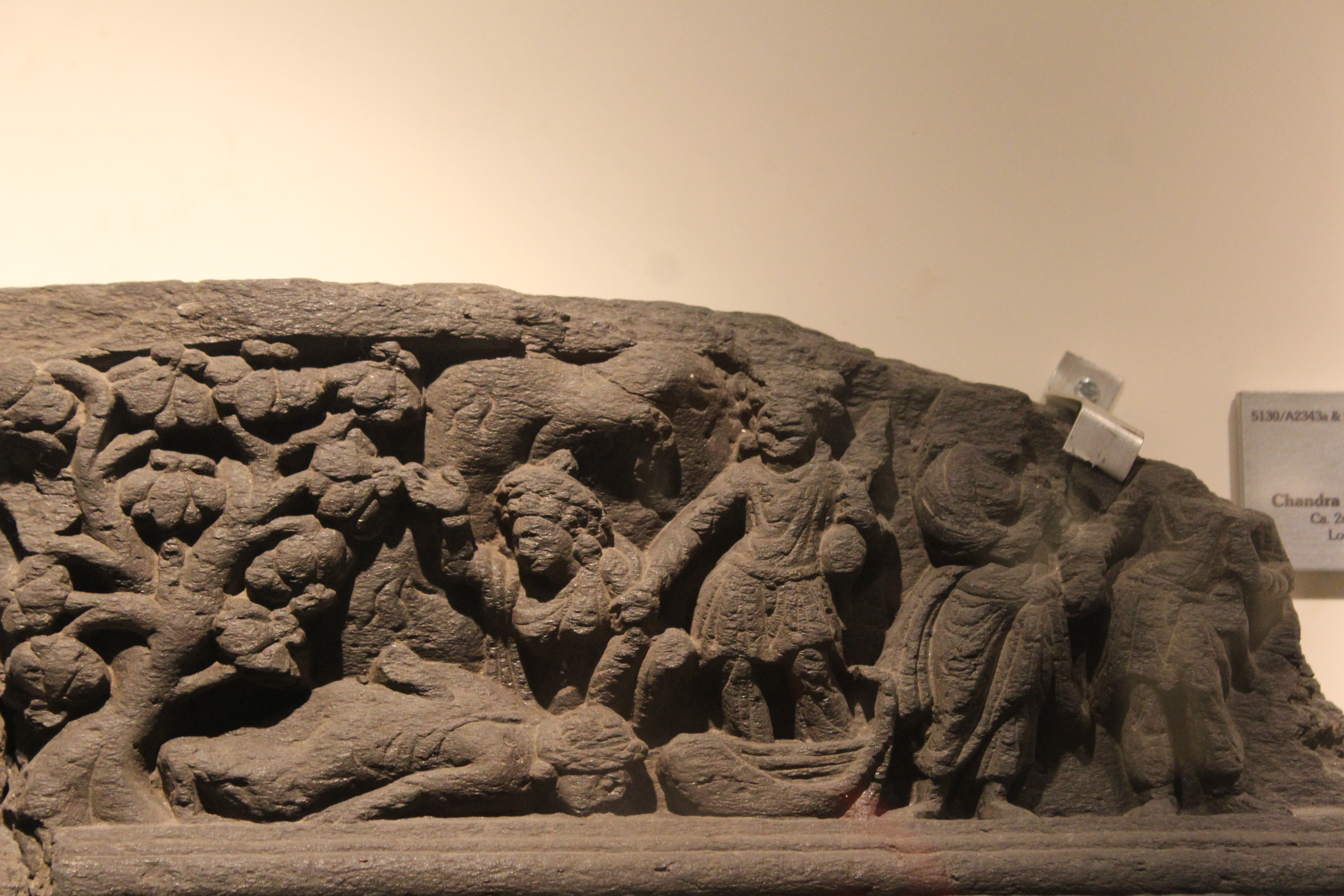
Loriyan Tangai sculpture

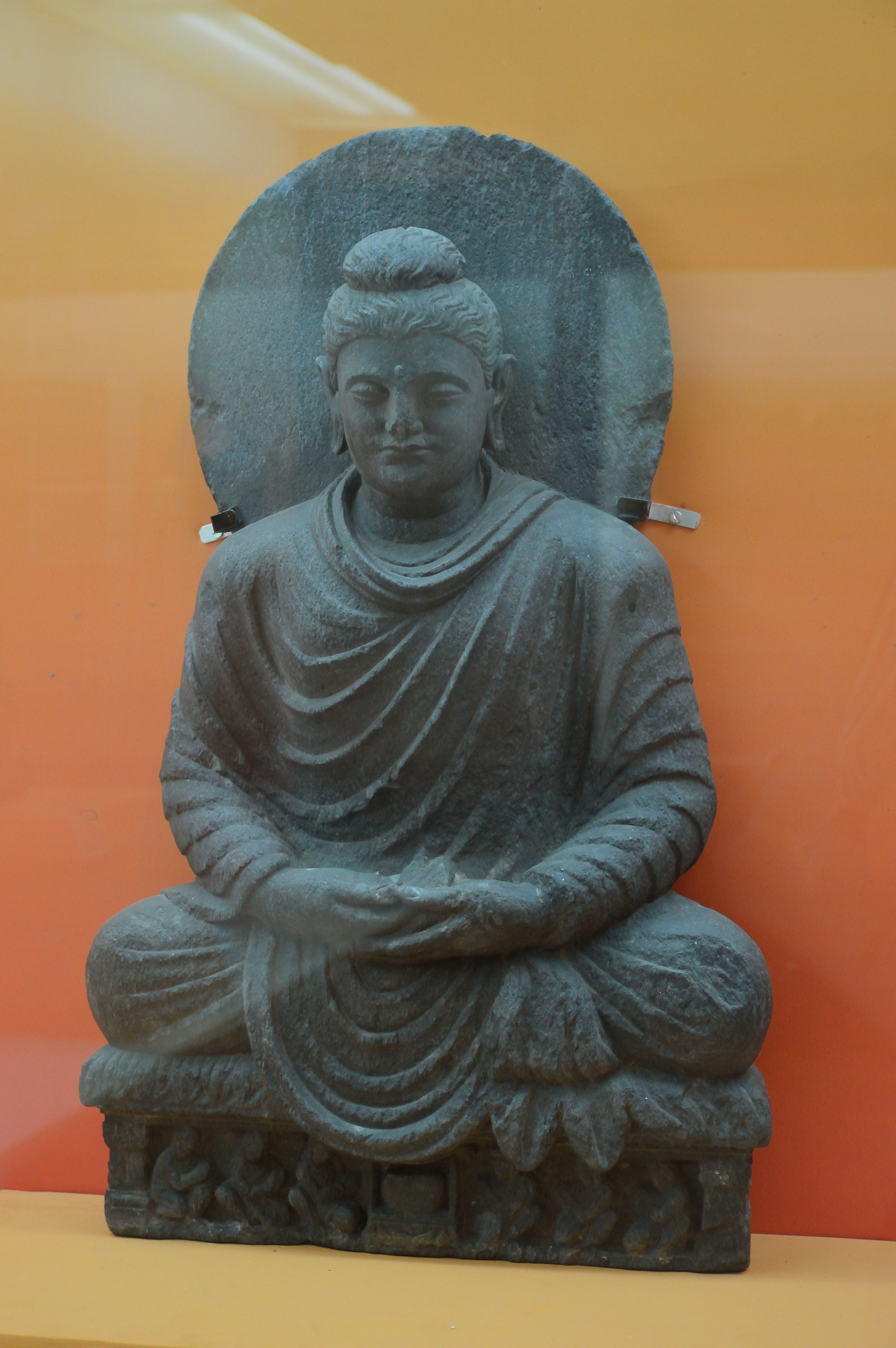
Loriyan Tangai sculpture

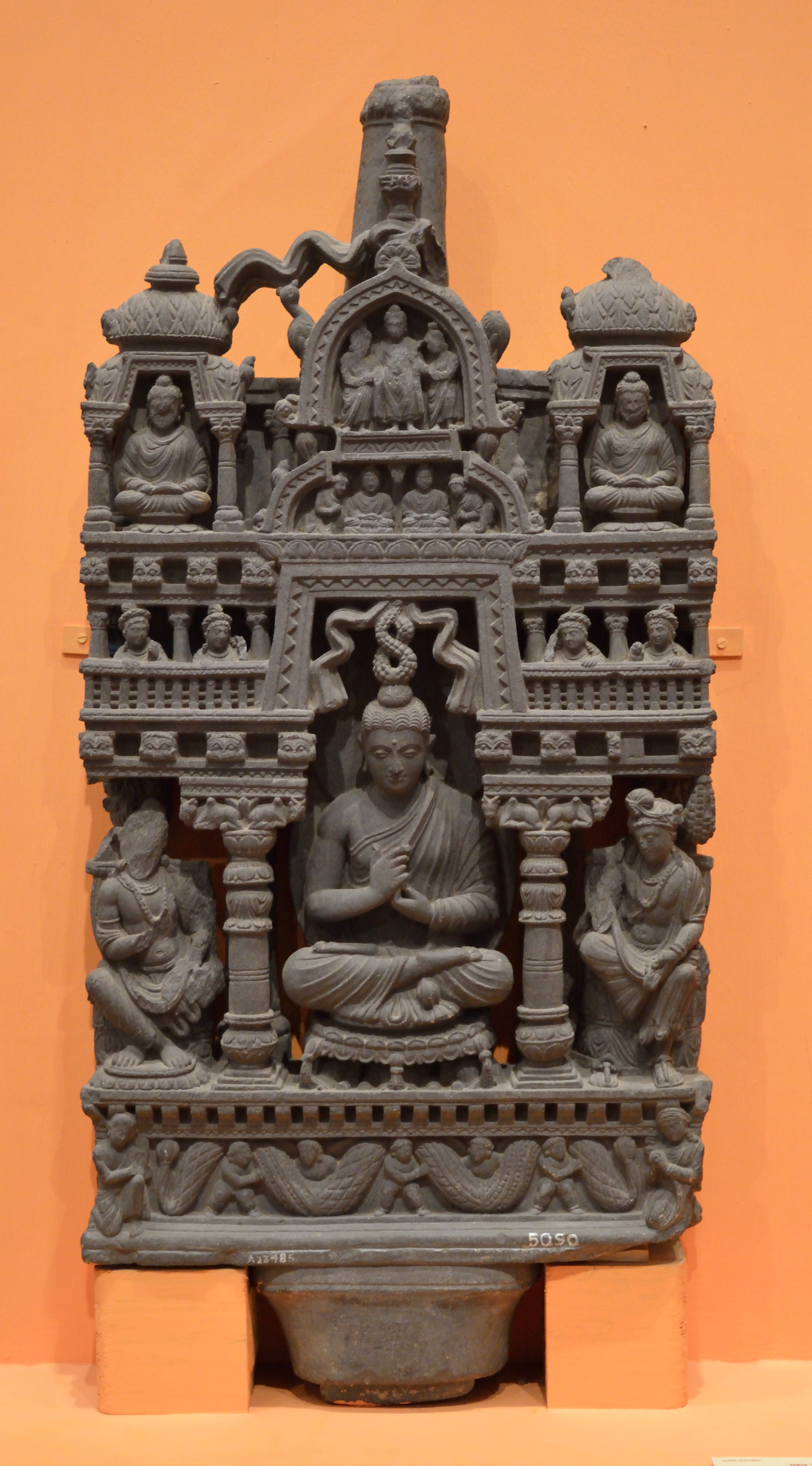
Loriyan Tangai sculpture

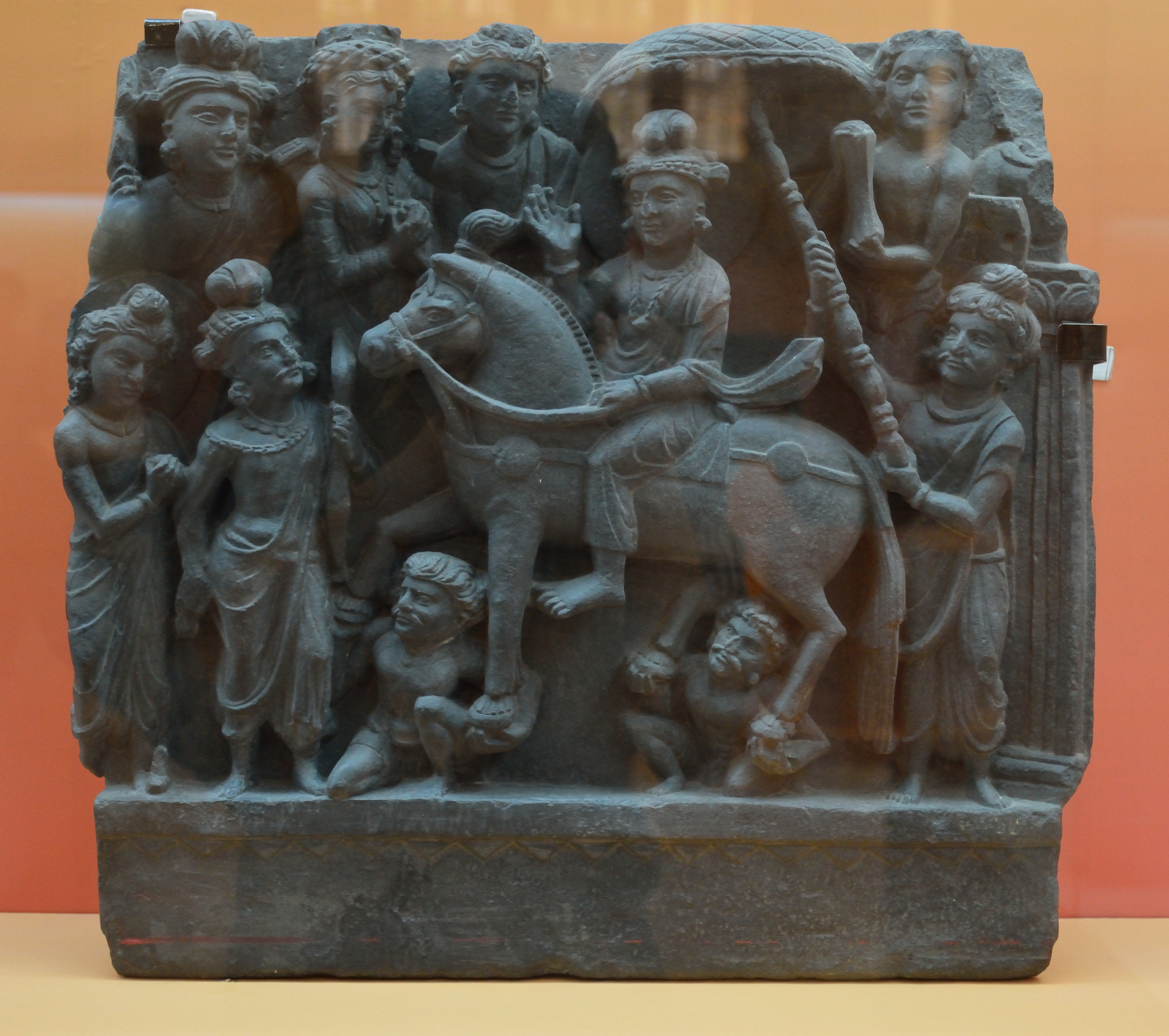
Loriyan Tangai sculpture

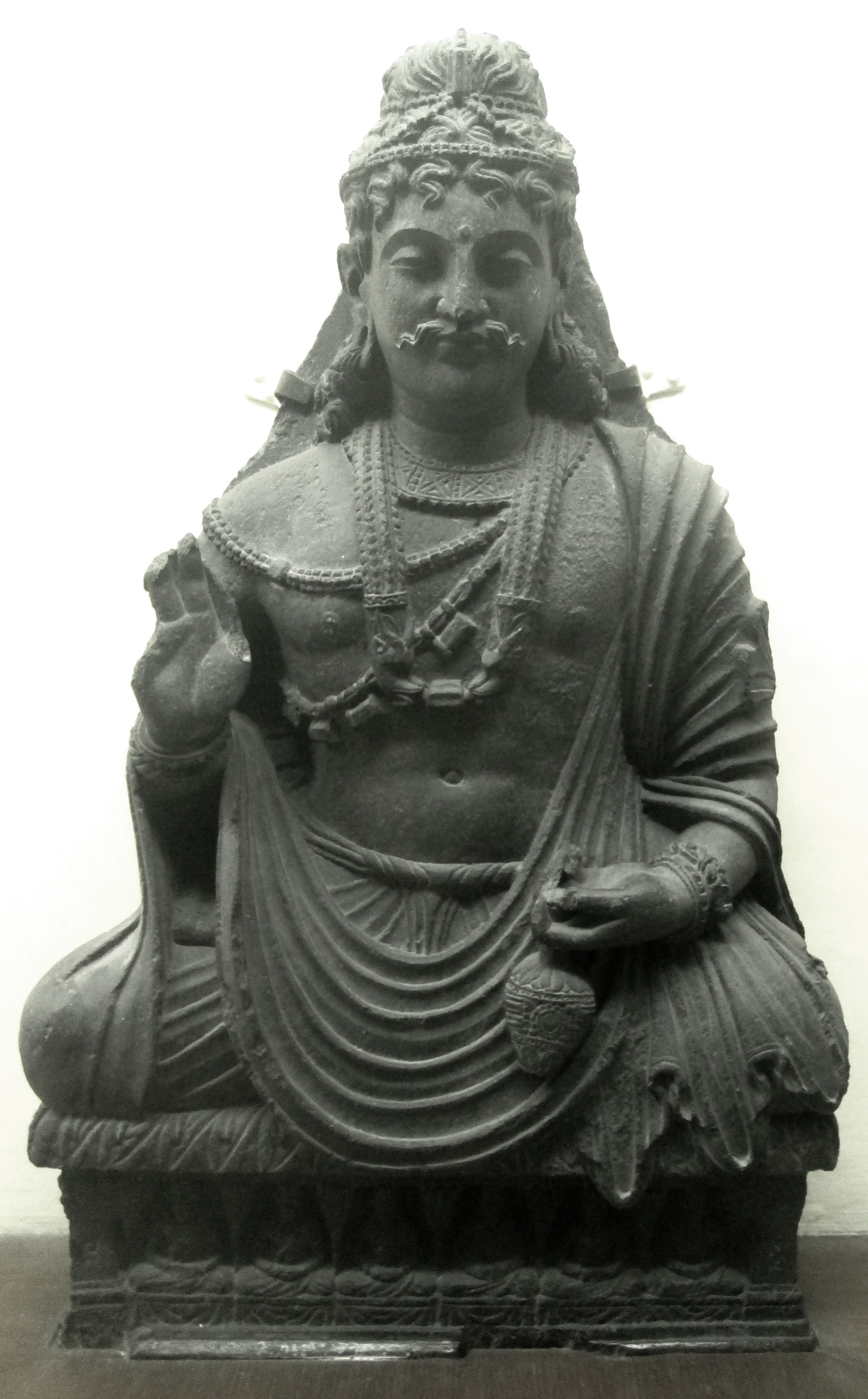
Loriyan Tangai sculpture

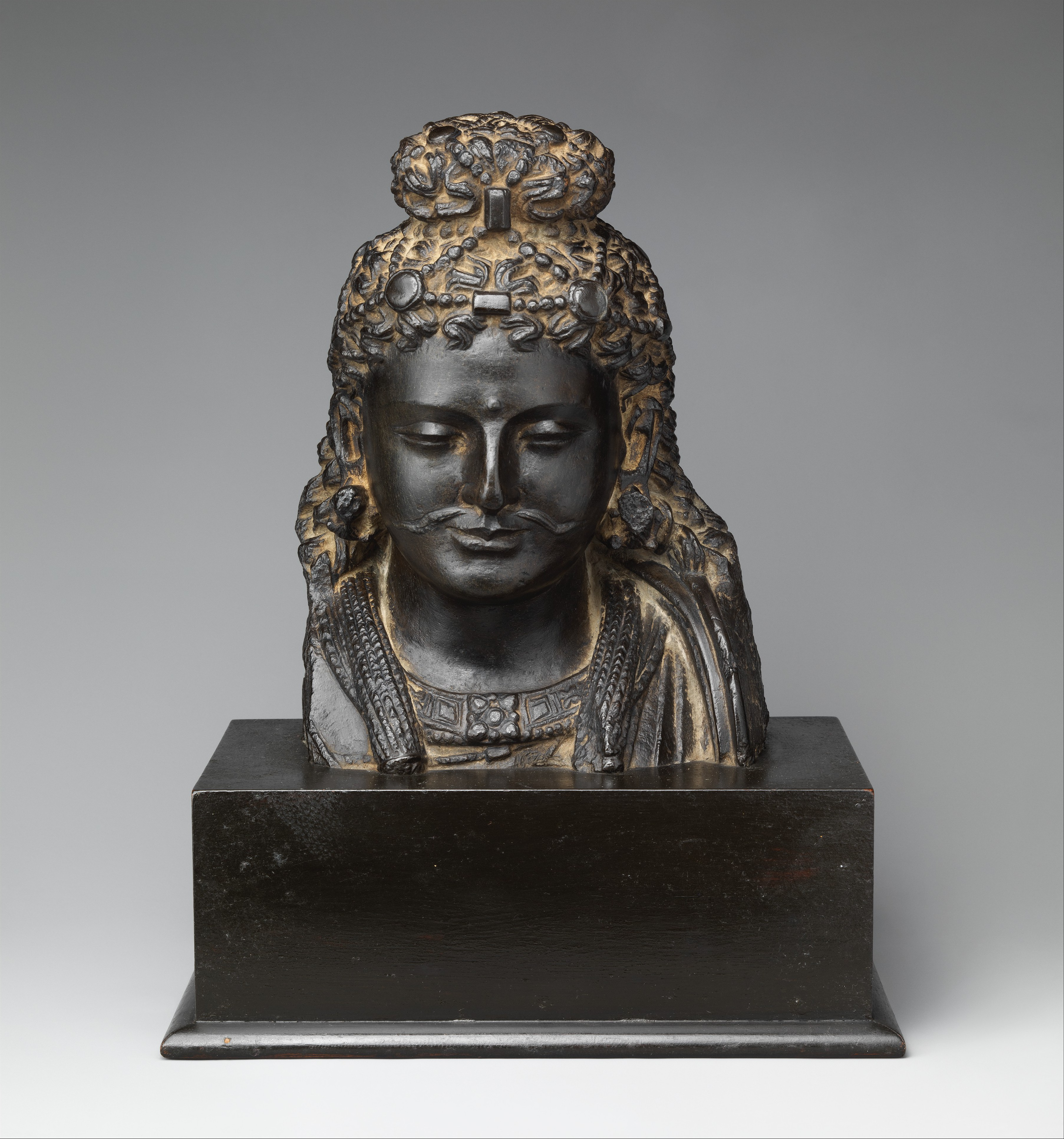
Bust of a Bodhisattva, possibly Maitreya, Loriyan Tangai, 2nd-3rd century
