= Muhammadzai (Hashtnagar) =

Pashtun tribe

- Location: Charsadda, Pakistan
- Language: Pashto
- Religion: Islam

The Muhammadzai (Pashto: محمدزی) are a Pashtun tribe residing primarily in Charsadda, Pakistan.

== Origins ==
This group traces Pashtun descent from the son of Zamand, the third son of Kharshbun. They originate from Afghanistan.

The Muhammadzai are descendants of Sharkhbun, the brother of Kharshbun; the latter had three sons, Kand, Zamand, and Kasi. Muhammad Ibn Zamand was Zamand's son, so they were popular with the tribe.

== Location ==
The tribe is found primarily in Hashtnagar, an area in Charsadda District, Khyber Pakhtunkhwa, Pakistan, that borders the Swat River's left bank. They were originally said to have resided in Afghanistan, but moved to the Charsadda region, then called Hashtnagar, as a result of a war against the Dilazak in which the Muhammadzai joined forces with Yousafzai and Gigyani and divided the lands between themselves. The Muhammadzai took control of Hashtnagar, the most fertile region, while the Gigyani took southern Bajaur and Doaba. because the branches of the tribe and the villages they each inhabited share the same names. The following breakdown comes from an 1878 report on what was then part of the Peshawar District: Tangi (Barazai and Nasratzai), Sherpao, Umarzai, Turangzai, Utmanzai, Dargai, all these tribes are living in Charsadda, and Prang. Rose's tribal glossary adds that "with them are settled a few descendants of Muhammad's brothers, from one of whom, Kheshgi, one of their principal villages is named." Their irrigated, rice-bearing lands along the Swat River are known as the lowlands or sholgira. In contrast, the high lands are referred to as the maira. One sub division of Muhammadzai Hashtnagar arrived in Ghwarband valley of district Shangla and settled there. Although mainly located in the Hashtnagar area of Charsadda, the Muhammadzai are also based in Akora Khattak and Peshawar.

== Politics and influence ==
The most famous Muhammadzai tribesmen were the Pashtun leaders Dr Khan Sahib and his brother Abdul Ghaffar Khan, his son Khan Abdul Wali Khan and his grandson Asfandyar Wali Khan. As well as the prominent Pashto poet Ghani Khan son of Abdul Ghaffar Khan and Aimal Wali khan and Muhammad Shawal son of Arshad Ali. They are originally from Utmanzai, where their father was a well-to-do landlord and village khan. Aftab Ahmad Khan Sherpao is another well known leader and a chairman of QWP.

== Notable members ==
Notable tribesmen are;

- The prominent Pashto poet Ghani Khan, the son of Abdul Ghaffar Khan
- Politician Aimal Wali Khan
- Haji Sahib of Turangzai, a Pashtun independence freedom fighter who fought in the 1897 Frontier Revolt against the British Empire.
