= Ayodhya Inscription of Dhana =

1st-century BCE inscription

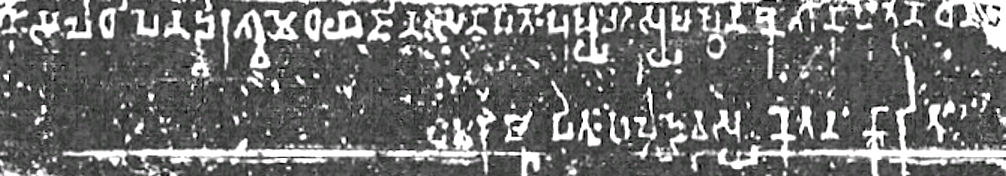
- Oldest sanskrit inscription
- Material: Stone
- Writing: Sanskrit
- Created: 1st century BCE – 1st century CE
- Place: Ayodhya, Uttar Pradesh
- Present location: Ranopali monastery, Shri Udasin Sangat Rishi Ashram

Location
- Ranopali Ashram, Ayodhya (India)

Ayodhya Inscription of Dhana is a stone inscription related to a Hindu Deva king named Dhana or Dhana–deva of the 1st-century BCE or 1st century CE. He ruled from the city of Ayodhya, Kosala, in India. His name is found in ancient coins and the inscription. According to P. L. Gupta, he was among the fifteen kings who ruled from Ayodhya between 130 BCE and 158 CE, and whose coins have been found: Muladeva, Vayudeva, Vishakadeva, Dhanadeva, Ajavarman, Sanghamitra, Vijayamitra, Satyamitra, Devamitra and Aryamitra. D.C. Sircar dates the inscription to 1st-century CE based on the epigraphical evidence. The paleography of the inscription is identical to that of the Northern Satraps in Mathura, which gives a 1st century CE date. The damaged inscription is notable for its mention of general Pushyamitra and his descendant Dhana–, his use of Vedic Ashvamedha horse to assert the range of his empire, and the building of a temple shrine.

== Sunga inscription from Ayodhya ==
The Ayodhya inscription of the Sunga dynasty era was found by Babu Jagannath Das Ratnakara at the Ranopali monastery in Ayodhya. The inscription is in Sanskrit, written in Brahmi script, and the inscribed stone is found on a flat surface on a footstone at the eastern entrance to the samadhi (memorial) of Baba Sangat Bakhsh, of Udasi Sikhs. The Udasi trace their heritage to the eldest son of Guru Nanak. The samadhi monument is inside the Ranopali monastery of Udasi Sampradaya, also called Shri Udasin Rishi Ashram, in a section located to the west. It is believed to have been built during the time of Nawab Shuja-ud-daula, and the inscribed stone likely came from some ruins of the period.

According to Kunal Kishore, the inscription is not grammatically correct Sanskrit. Others scholars disagree and state that except for one minor scribe error, the inscription is in good Sanskrit.

=== Inscription ===
The discovered inscription is damaged and incomplete. It reads:

1. Kosal-adhipena dvir-asvamedha-yajinah senapateh Pushyamitrasya shashthena Kausiki-putrena Dhana
2. Dharmarajna pituh Phalgudevasya ketanam karitam

– Shunga dynasty Ayodhya Inscription, 1st-century BCE – 1st century CE

=== Translation ===
Sahni – a Sanskrit scholar, translates it as,

Dhana (deva, bhuti, etc), Lord of Kosala, son of Kausiki, the sixth of the Senapati Pushyamitra, who had performed the Ashvamedha twice, erected a shrine (or other memorial) in honor of Phalgudeva, the father of the Dharmaraja.

— Dhana's Ayodhya inscription

=== Significance ===
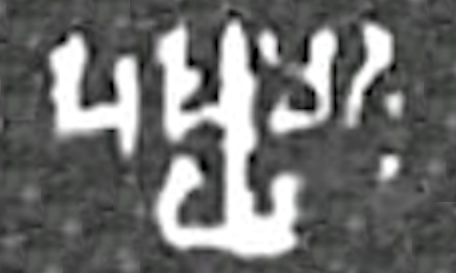
The name "Pushyamitra" (Brahmi script: 𑀧𑀼𑀰𑁆𑀬𑀫𑀺𑀢𑁆𑀭) in the Ayodhya Inscription of Dhana.

The Sunga inscription is short but one that has attracted much debate. Scholars disagree on how to interpret Pushyamitrasya shashthena. It literally means the "sixth of Pushyamitra", which can be interpreted as "sixth son of Pushyamitra" or "sixth descendant of [generation after] Pushyamitra". The former interpretation would mean Dhana likely lived in early 1st-century BCE, the later would imply Dhana to be a great grandchild of a great grandchild through the father or mother side, and he lived in 1st-century CE.

According to Bhandare, there is uncertainty if there were more than one ancient kings named Dhanadeva. The inscription suggests there was one in the 1st century BCE, while the dating of the coins with Dhanadeva name range from 1st century BCE to 3rd century CE. Typically, both are considered to be the same. The coins with Dhanadeva were mold cast, were made from silver or copper, and show a bull with fodder tray in front. His name is in Brahmi script, and the coins also show swastika and Ujjayini signs.

The ancient Ayodhya inscription is significant also because it establishes that the Hindu Shunga dynasty was ruling Ayodhya around the 1st century BCE, that the custom of building temple shrines to popular leaders or famous kings was already in vogue by then, and that Phalgudeva may have been the same person as Pushyamitra. It is also the earliest epigraphical evidence that the general Pushyamitra Shunga founded a dynasty and performed the Vedic ritual Ashvamedha twice (it is unclear why he did it twice).

== See also ==
- Chandragupta Maurya
- Hathibada Ghosundi Inscriptions
- Nanaghat Inscription
- Sects of Sikhism
