= Haji Sahib of Turangzai =

Islamic Militant

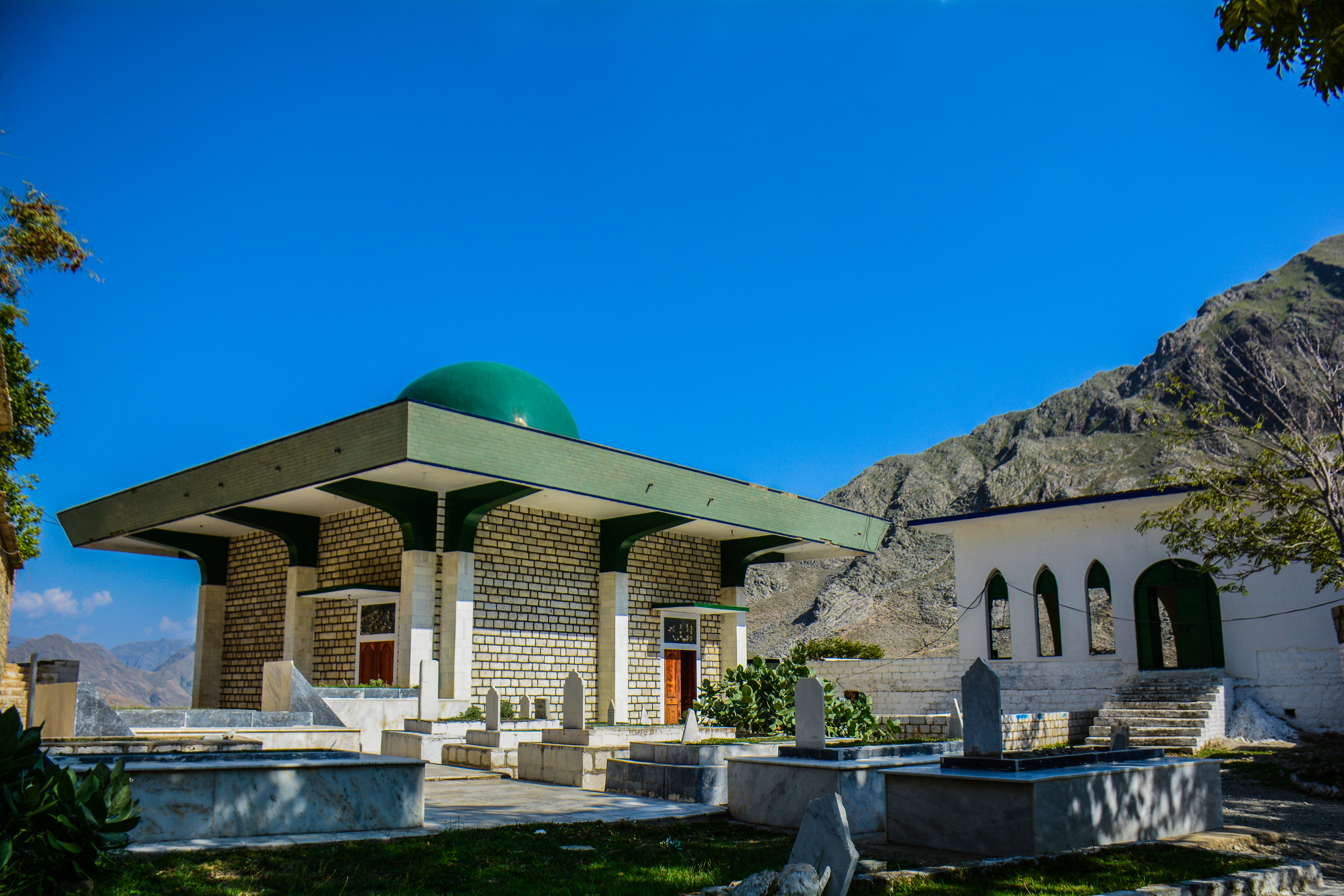
- Shrine of Haji Sahib Turangzai
- Born: Fazal Wahid; 1842; Turangzai
- Died: December 14, 1937 (aged 94–95)
- Military career
- Allegiance: Afghania
- Conflicts: 1897 Frontier revolt Mohmand campaign of 1935

Haji Sahib of Turangzai (real name Fazal Wahid; 1858 – December 14, 1937) was a Pashtun militant, Freedom fighter and social worker of Mohmand and the Ghorikhel tribe in the late 19th century and early 20th century.

== Biography ==
Born Fazal Wahid to a Muhammadzai family in 1858 at Turangzai, in district Charsadda, modern Pakistan. His father's name was Fazal Ahad. After receiving his early religious education at home, Haji Sahib went to the Darul Uloom Deoband where he grew an attachment to Sheikh ul Hind Maulana Mahmood ul Hasan and in 1890, accompanied the Sheikh on the Hajj.

On his return he fought against the British in the 1897 Frontier revolt, in which there was a general uprising against the British by the frontier tribes.

The revolt was ultimately unsuccessful, and in 1908, Haji Sahib went on the Hajj once again. On his return he became preoccupied with social work, education in particular. It was during this time he started touring each village and town along with Khan Abdul Ghaffar Khan, better known as Bacha Khan. The movement proved successful, and almost 120 schools were established in the space of a few years.

The British government reacted negatively to events, and accused Haji Sahib as well as Ghaffar Khan of running a parallel government to that of the British. They had him arrested and put on trial. He briefly attempted to oppose the British government but was arrested. On the basis of lack of evidence, Haji Sahib was released, but his fellow workers were given sentences of up to three years.

In 1913, Sir Sahibzada Abdul Qayyum Khan chose Haji Sahib of Turangzai to inaugurate the foundation laying ceremony of the Darul Uloom Islamia in Peshawar, present day Islamia College.

In June 1915 the British government issued an arrest warrant against him. Evading arrest at midnight, Haji Sahib left Peshawar and headed for Mohmand Territory along with his sons and trusted friends. Within days of arriving at Mohmand Agency, Haji Sahib along with Mujahideen from Chamarkand accelerated attacks on British positions in the nearby areas. The Chamarkand Mujahideen were under the leadership of Ameer Niamatullah Khan. In August 1915, they attacked a British camp stationed at Rustam in Mardan.

In 1923, the British sent their troops to Mohmand Territory to stamp out the resistance. This time however, instead of any bloodshed they managed to sign a truce after which they pushed back their troops. It proved a pyrrhic victory, and he eventually settled in Mohmand agency where he became preoccupied with building a mosque.

In 1936, Haji Sahib fell seriously ill. With time, his condition worsened and died on 14 December 1937 aged 81.
