= Gomitra =

Ancien ruler of the Mitra dynasty

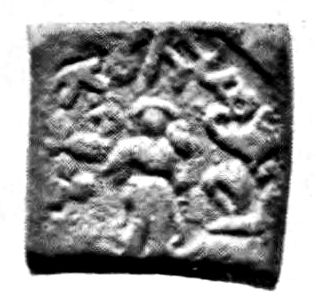
Coin of Gomitra of Mathura. Rev. Inscription Gomitasa. Standing figure with symbols around.

Gomitra was one of the first rulers of the Mitra dynasty, a group of rulers whose name incorporated the suffix "-mitra" and who are thought to have ruled the area of Mathura from around 150 BCE to 50 BCE. It is thought that Gomitra ruled during the second half of the 2nd century BCE.

Gomitra potin Karshapana coins with, on the obverse a goddess standing among symbols, with a tree to the left, a river below, and a Srivatsa and small Ujjain symbol to the right. The legend in Brahmi bears the name Gomitasa. On the reverse can be seen three facing elephants with riders.
