= Plato of Bactria =

Bactrian king

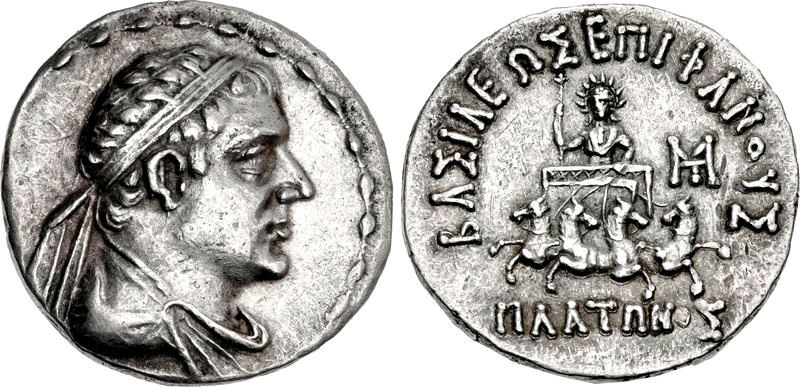
Tetradrachm of Plato Epiphanes. Obverse shows the Diademed bust of king, and reverse shows Helios, riding a four-horse chariot. Greek legend: ΒΑΣΙΛΕΩΣ ΕΠΙΦΑΝΟΥΣ ΠΛΑΤΩΝΟΣ Basileos Epiphanous Platonos, "of God-manifest King Plato". Coin marked MZ, possibly is a dating which equals year 47 Yavana era = 138 BC

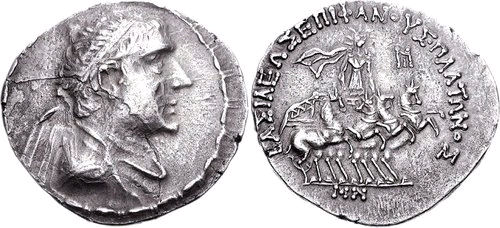
Tetradrachm of Plato Epiphanes. Obverse shows the Diademed bust of Plato. The reverse shows Helios, riding a four-horse chariot. Greek legend: ΒΑΣΙΛΕΩΣ ΕΠΙΦΑΝΟΥΣ ΠΛΑΤΩΝΟΣ, Basileos Epiphanous Platonos, "of God-manifest King Plato". Coin marked MN, possibly is a dating which equals year 48 Yavana era = 137 BC

Plato Epiphanes (Ancient Greek: Πλάτων ὁ Ἐπιφανής, Plátōn ho Epiphanḗs, "Plato the God-Manifest") was a Greco-Bactrian king who reigned for a short time in southern Bactria or the Paropamisadae during the mid 2nd century BC.

== Coinage ==
The style of Plato's coins suggests that he was a relative — most likely a brother since Plato is a middle-aged man on his coins — of Eucratides the Great, whose rise to power is dated to around 170–165 BC.

Some of Plato's coins have inscriptions which may possibly be interpreted as dates using the Indo-Greek era which started around 186 BC. In that case Plato ruled around 140 BC. This matches the dating given by numismatician Bopearachchi, who places Plato between 145–140 BC, since his coins are not found in the ruins of Ai Khanoum, a Bactrian city which was destroyed during the reign of Eucratides.

== Gallery ==
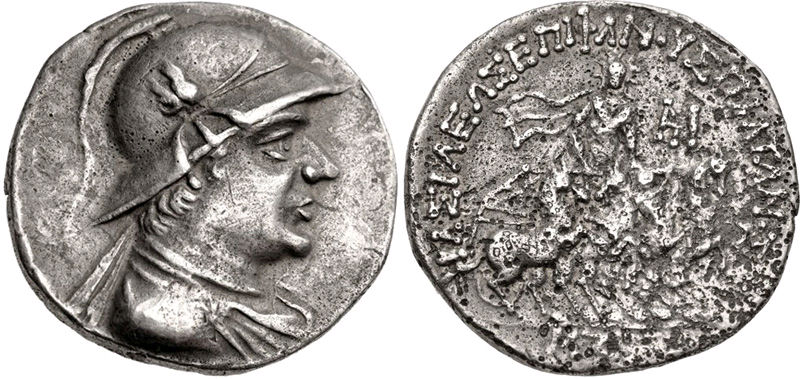
Silver coin of Plato Epiphanes wearing a crested Bactrian helmet adorned with bull's horn and ear.

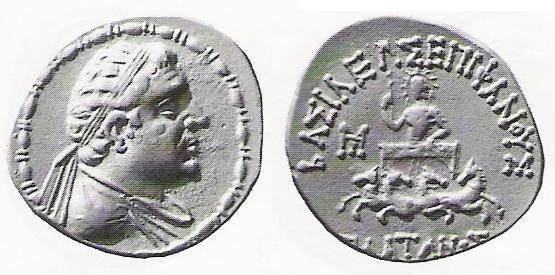
Another coin of Plato Epiphanes, bare headed and wearing a diadem.

== See also ==
- Greco-Bactrian Kingdom
- Seleucid Empire
- Greco-Buddhism
- Indo-Scythians
- Indo-Parthian Kingdom
- Kushan Empire

	Greco-Bactrian kings		Indo-Greek kings					
Territories/ dates	West Bactria	East Bactria	Paropamisade	Arachosia	Gandhara	Western Punjab	Eastern Punjab	Mathura
326-325 BCE	Campaigns of Alexander the Great in India						Nanda Empire	
312 BCE	Creation of the Seleucid Empire						Creation of the Maurya Empire	
305 BCE	Seleucid Empire after Mauryan war		Maurya Empire					
280 BCE	Foundation of Ai-Khanoum							
255–239 BCE	Independence of the Greco-Bactrian kingdom Diodotus I		Emperor Ashoka (268-232 BCE)					
239–223 BCE	Diodotus II							
230–200 BCE	Euthydemus I							
200–190 BCE	Demetrius I				Sunga Empire			
190-185 BCE	Euthydemus II							
190–180 BCE	Agathocles			Pantaleon				
185–170 BCE	Antimachus I							
180–160 BCE			Apollodotus I					
175–170 BCE	Demetrius II							
160–155 BCE			Antimachus II					
170–145 BCE	Eucratides I							
155–130 BCE	Yuezhi occupation, loss of Ai-Khanoum	Eucratides II; Plato; Heliocles I	Menander I					
130–120 BCE	Yuezhi occupation		Zoilus I		Agathoclea			Yavanarajya inscription
120–110 BCE			Lysias		Strato I			Yavanarajya inscription
110–100 BCE			Antialcidas		Heliocles II			Yavanarajya inscription
100 BCE			Polyxenus		Demetrius III			Yavanarajya inscription
100–95 BCE			Philoxenus					Yavanarajya inscription
95–90 BCE			Diomedes	Amyntas		Epander		Yavanarajya inscription
90 BCE			Theophilus	Peucolaus		Thraso		Yavanarajya inscription
90–85 BCE			Nicias	Menander II		Artemidorus		Yavanarajya inscription
90–70 BCE			Hermaeus	Archebius				Yavanarajya inscription
			Yuezhi occupation		Maues (Indo-Scythian)			
75–70 BCE				Vonones	Telephus	Apollodotus II		
65–55 BCE				Spalirises		Hippostratus	Dionysius	
55–35 BCE					Azes I (Indo-Scythians)		Zoilus II	
55–35 BCE					Vijayamitra/ Azilises		Apollophanes	
25 BCE – 10 CE				Gondophares	Zeionises	Kharahostes	Strato II; Strato III	
				Gondophares (Indo-Parthian)			Rajuvula (Indo-Scythian)	
			Kujula Kadphises (Kushan Empire)				Bhadayasa (Indo-Scythian)	Sodasa (Indo-Scythian)
