= Brahmamitra =

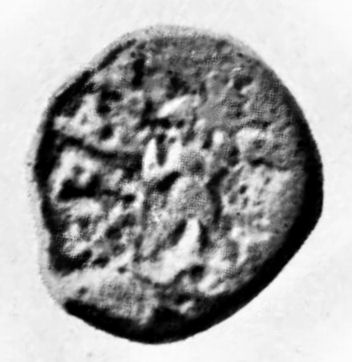
Coin of Brahmamitra (reverse): Standing figure with raised arm, surrounding by symbols. Legend Brahmamitasa in Brahmi.

Brahmamitra was one of the first rulers of the Mitra dynasty, a group of rulers whose name incorporated the suffix "-mitra" and who are thought to have ruled the area of Mathura from around 150 BCE to 50 BCE.
