= Shodago Baba Ji =

Pakistani religious and spiritual leader

Maulana Syed Hazrat
- مولانا سید حضرت المعروف شوڈاگو بابا جی

Personal life
- Born: c. 1911 Buner District
- Died: 24 December 2021 (aged 109) Charsadda
- Resting place: Shodago, Sherpao, Charsadda
- Other name: Shodago Baba Ji
- Relatives: Pir Baba (Grandparent)

Religious life
- Religion: Islam
- Denomination: Sunni
- Profession: Islamic scholar and Saint

Maulana Syed Hazrat, (مولانا سید حضرت المعروف شوڈاگو بابا جی), also known as Shodago Baba Ji (1911 - 24 December 2021) was a Pakistani religious and spiritual leader from Jowar, Buner District. A descendants of Pir Baba, he dedicated 80 years preaching Islam. Shodago Baba Ji died at the age of 109 in Charsadda. His teachings have influenced students across Pakistan, Afghanistan, and beyond.

Notably, South African cricketer Hashim Amla was among his devotees and visited him in Charsadda alongside Javed Afridi, the owner of Peshawar Zalmi.

== Death ==
He died on 24 December 2021 aged 109 in Charsadda. He was buried in his ancestral cemetery in the Shodago Sherpao area. The funeral prayer was attended by a large number of students from Khyber Pakhtunkhwa, Punjab and other parts of the country, leaders of political parties, locals and government officials. Khyber Pakhtunkhwa Chief Minister Mahmood Khan, Aftab Sherpao and others expressed grief over the death.
