= Sherpao =

Human settlement in Pakistan

The Sherpao (Pashto:شیرپاو) is a cadet branch of the Pashtun Muhammadzai Tribe.

== Background ==
As their name suggests, they are found in the village of Sherpao in the Hashtnagar area of Charsadda District, Pakistan. Sherpao, the common ancestor of the family, was the grandson of Muhammad, the common ancestor of the Muhammadzai. According to Captain E. G. G. Hastings in 1878, the Sherpao had only one high-land hamlet named Dakai, as their other lands were lost to surrounding tribes.

== Politics ==
The Sherpao family has played a prominent role in Pakistani politics. Khan Bahadur Ghulam Haider Khan Sherpao was a prominent leader in the Pakistan movement. His son Hayat Sherpao was a founder of the Pakistan People's Party (PPP) and the youngest governor of the North-West Frontier Province (current Khyber Pakhtunkhwa) before his life was cut short by a tragic assassination at Peshawar University on February 8, 1975. His assassination has had a profound effect on the political landscape of Pakistan and still continues to be relevant in the politics of the country. His younger brother, Aftab Ahmad Sherpao, is one of the most senior and recognized political leaders of the country and continues to play an active role in politics in his neo-nationalist party Qaumi Watan Party. In the past he has served as Pakistan's Interior Minister, Pakistan's Minister for Water & Power, besides being Minister for Kashmir Affairs and Northern Areas and States and Frontier Regions, before having twice served as the Chief Minister of Khyber Pakhtunkhwa.

== See also ==
- Shodago Baba Ji
