= Ghwarband =

Valley in the Shangla District of the Khyber Pakhtunkhwa province, Pakistan

Ghwarband/Ghorband is a valley in the Shangla District of the Khyber Pakhtunkhwa province, Pakistan.

The Khans of Ghwarband/Ghorband valley belong to the Yousufzai and Muhammadzai (Hashtnagar) tribe. The local population are Gujjars.

One sub-division of the Muhammadzai tribe is settled in Ghwarband valley.

Hafiz Alpuri was born in the valley of Ghwarband. He belonged to the Mandan Yousafzai tribe. Muhammad Anwar baba, a famous Pushtun Khan, belonged to the Muhammadzai tribe of Pushtuns was also born in Ghwarband.
