= Yavana era =

Era of ancient India

Yavana era
(174 BCE)
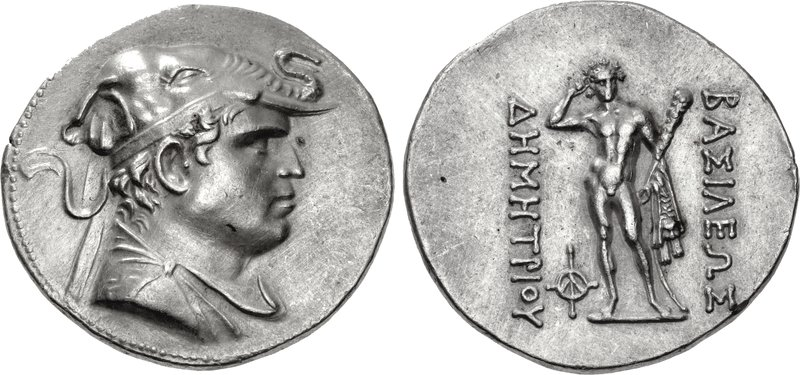
The Yavana era was thought to have started in 186–185 BCE, at the time of the expansion into India of Greco-Bactrian king Demetrius, but now is more probably attributed to 174 BCE.

The Yavana Era, or Yona (Prakrit: Yoṇaṇa vaṣaye) was a computational era used in the Indian subcontinent from the 2nd century BCE for several centuries thereafter, probably starting in 174 BCE. It was initially thought that the era started around 180-170 BCE, and corresponded to accession to the Greco-Bactrian throne of Eucratides, who solidified Hellenic presence in the Northern regions of India. The Greeks in India flourished under the reign of the illustrious, Menander - greatest of the Yavana rulers, who campaigned as far as Pataliputra in Eastern India. It is now equated with the formerly theorized "Old Śaka era".

Harry Falk and others have suggested that the Yavana era actually started in 174 BCE, based on a reevaluation of the Azes era which is now thought to have started in 47/46 BCE. The exact historical event corresponding to the creation of this Yavana era is uncertain, but it may mark the alliance of Antimachos I and Apollodotus I in toppling Agathokles, thereby creating a unified realm north and south of the Hindu-Kush.

The creation of specific eras is a well-known phenomenon marking great dynastical events, such as the Seleucid era (starting in 312 BCE, with the return of Seleucus to Babylon), the Arsacid Era in Parthia (starting in 248/247 BCE), the Azes era in Gandhara (starting in 47/46 BCE), and the Kanishka era, when he established his empire in 127 CE.

It is now thought that the Kushan king Kanishka I created his own era precisely 300 years after the Yavana era, and probably in reference to it, so that year 1 of Kanishka (127 CE) would correspond exactly to year 301 of the Yavana era. Arguably, Kanishka wished to link his own rule to the rule of the Indo-Greeks, who for the first time had united the areas of Bactria and parts of ancient India.

The Yavana era progressively fell into disuse after the creation of the Kanishka era, the Kanishka era being used exclusively in inscriptions on relic caskets from the 18th year of his reign, from 145 CE. On statues of the Buddha, an inscription using the Yavana era is known from Gandhara as late as 209 CE (year 384 of the Yavana era), with the "Hashtnagar Buddha".

== Coins of Plato ==
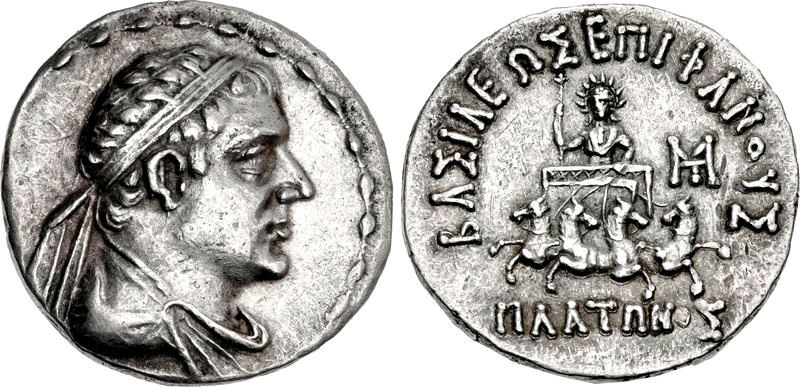
Tetradrachm of Plato. Obv: Diademed bust of Plato. Rev: Sun divinity Helios, riding a four-horse chariot. Greek legend: ΒΑΣΙΛΕΩΣ ΕΠΙΦΑΝΟΥΣ ΠΛΑΤΩΝΟΣ (BASILEOS EPIPHANOYS PLATONOS) "Of King Plato, Manifestation of God on earth". Coin marked MZ (bottom left of reverse), which possibly is a dating which equals year 47 Yavana era = 138 BCE.

Although Greco-Bactrian or Indo-Greek kings generally did not put dates on their coins, some of them Plato (circa 140 BCE) and Heliocles uncharacteristically do so. Some of the coins of Plato have inscriptions such as MZ, MT, MN which can be interpreted as dates in the Greek numerals system using the Yavana era which started around 186 BCE. In that case Plato ruled around 140 BCE. This matches the dating given by numismatician Bopearachchi, who places Plato between 145–140 BCE, since his coins are not found in the ruins of Ai Khanoum, a Bactrian city which was destroyed during the reign of Eucratides.

== Bajaur reliquary ==
A recently discovered reliquary (published by Salomon in 2005) from Bajaur gives a triple dating which allows to clarify the relationship between several eras: it is dated to the 27th regnal year of Vijayamitra, a king of the Indo-Scythian Apraca, the 73rd years of the Azes era, and the 201st year of the Greeks (Yonanas or Ionians).

"In the twenty-seventh - 27 - year in the reign of Lord Vijayamitra, the King of the Apraca; in the seventy-third - 73 - year which is called "of Azes", in the two hundred and first - 201 - year of the Yonas (Greeks), on the eighth day of the month of Sravana; on this day was established [this] stupa by Rukhana, the wife of the King of Apraca, [and] by Vijayamitra, the king of Apraca, [and] by Indravarma (Indravasu?), the commander (stratega), [together] with their wives and sons."

The inscription means that the Azes era started 128 years after the beginning of the Yavana era. At the time of the discovery, the Azes era being generally dated to 57 BCE, this implied that the Yavana era started in 185 BCE. It is now thought that the Yavana era actually started in 174 BCE, based on a reevaluation of the Azes era which is now thought to have started in 47/46 BCE.

== Yavanarajya inscription ==
The Yavanarajya inscription, dated to "year 116 of Yavana hegemony", probably 70 or 69 BCE. Mathura Museum.

The Yavanarajya inscription was discovered in Mathura, India in 1988. The inscription, carved on a block of red sandstone, is dated to the 1st century BCE, and is currently located at the Mathura Museum in Mathura. The inscription is important in that the Mathura sculptors mention the date of their dedication as "The last day of year 116 of Yavana hegemony (Yavanarajya)". It is considered that this inscription is attesting the control of the Indo-Greeks in the 2nd and 1st centuries BCE in Mathura, a fact that is also confirmed by numismatic and literary evidence. The new dates for the Yavana era (174 BCE) would give a date of 58 BCE for the Yavanarajya inscription, as 174 minus 116 equals 58.

== Date referential of Buddha statues in Gandhara ==
Loriya Tangai Buddha
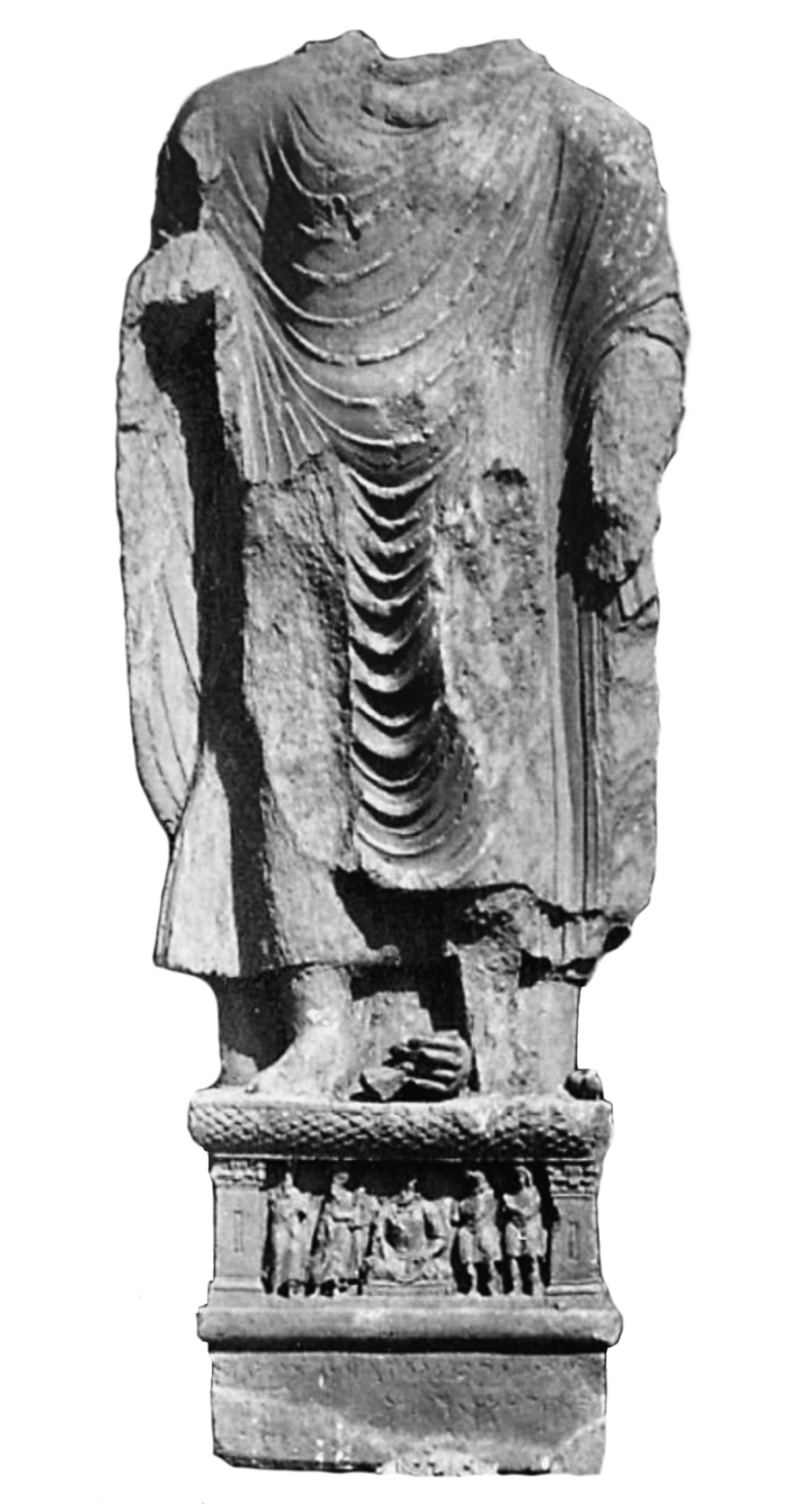
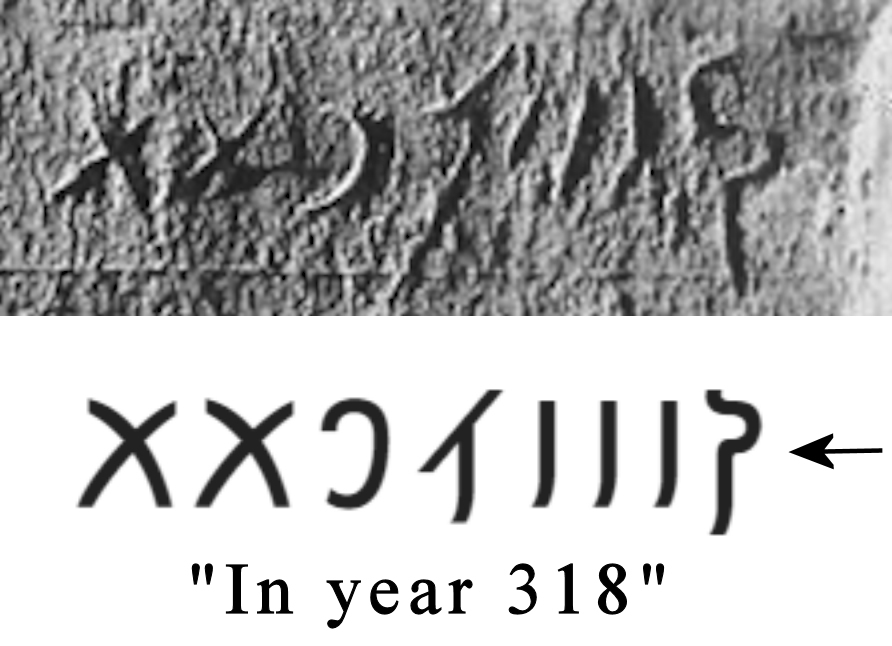
Statue with inscription mentioning "year 318", probably 143 CE.
Hashtnagar Buddha
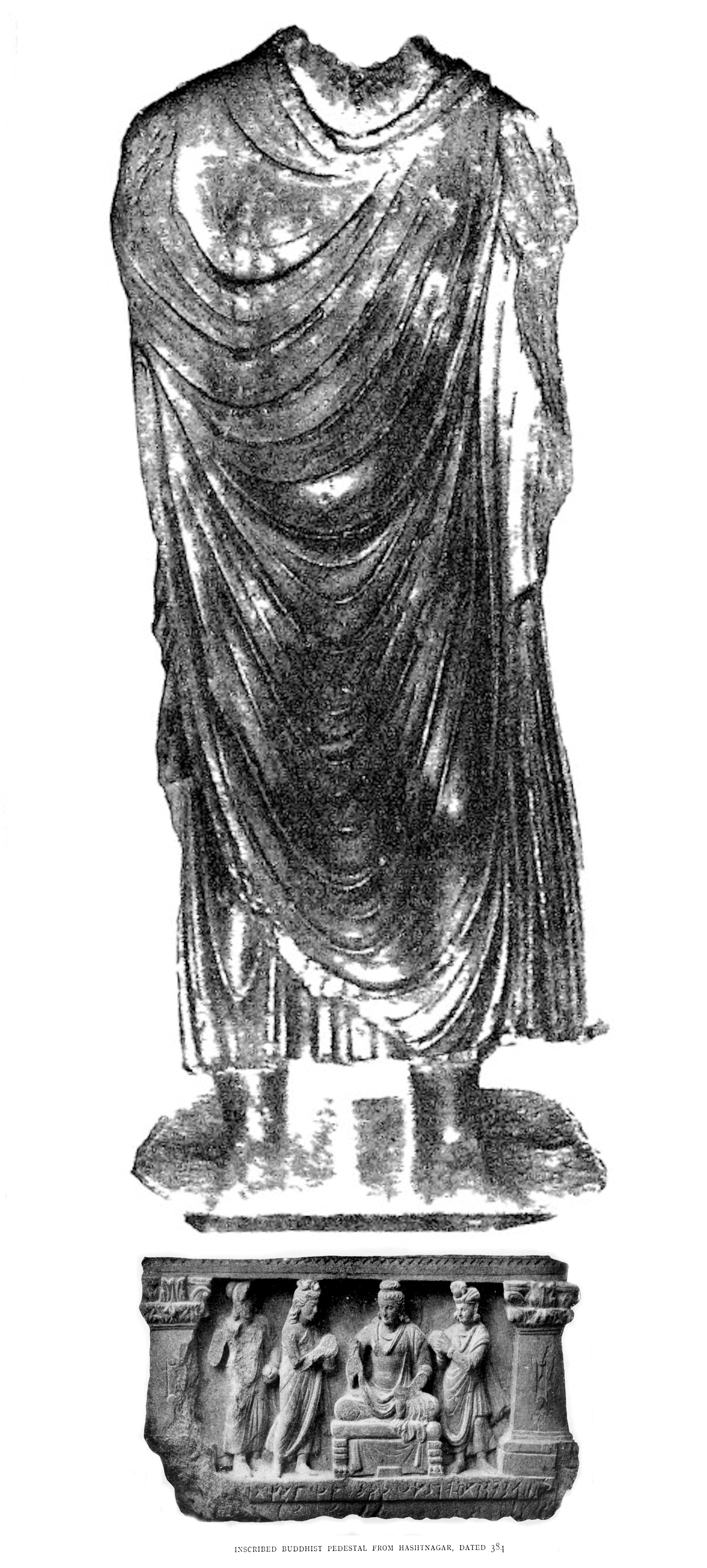
Statue and its piedestal (now separated) inscribed: sam 1 1 1 100 20 20 20 20 4 Prothavadasa masasa divasammi pamcami 4 1 ("In the year 384, on the fifth, 5, day of the month Prausthapada").

Several Gandhara Buddha statues with dated inscriptions, are now thought to have been dated in the Yavana Era. One of the statues of the Buddha from Loriyan Tangai has an inscription mentioning "the year 318". The era in question is not specified, but it is now thought, following the discovery of the Bajaur reliquary inscription, that it is about the Yavana era beginning in 174 BCE, and gives a date for the Buddha statue of about 143 CE.

The inscription at the base of the statue is:

sa 1 1 1 100 10 4 4 Prothavadasa di 20 4 1 1 1 Budhagosa danamu(khe) Saghorumasa sadaviyasa

"In year 318, the day 27 of Prausthapada, gift of Buddhaghosa, the companion of Samghavarma"

— Inscription of the Buddha of Loriyan Tangai.

This would make it one of the earliest known representations of the Buddha, after the Bimaran casket (1st century CE), and at about the same time as the Buddhist coins of Kanishka.

The two devotees on the right side of the pedestal are in Indo-Scythian suit (loose trousers, tunic, and hood). Their characteristic trousers appear clearly on close-up pictures. The statue is now in Indian Museum of Calcutta.

Another statue of Buddha, the Buddha of Hashtnagar, is inscribed from the year 384, which is thought to be 209 CE. Only the pedestal is preserved in the British Museum, the statue itself, with folds of clothing having more relief than those of the Loriyan Tangai Buddha, having disappeared.
