= Yavanarajya inscription =

Sanskrit inscription

- Ancient Sanskrit inscription Mathura GMM 88.150
- Material: red sandstone
- Size: 102 x 37 centimeters
- Writing: Sanskrit, Brahmi script
- Created: 1st Century BCE
- Discovered: 1988, in Maghera, a village outside Mathura; 27.571171°N 77.590097°E
- Place: Mathura, Uttar Pradesh
- Present location: Mathura Museum, India

Location

The Yavanarajya inscription, also called the Maghera Well Stone Inscription, was discovered in the village of Maghera, 17 kilometers north of Mathura, India in 1988. The Sanskrit inscription, carved on a block of red sandstone, is dated to the 1st century BCE, and is currently located at the Mathura Museum in Mathura. The inscription notes the donation of a water well and tank to the community in 1st century BCE, built by a Brahmin.

The inscription was published and analysed by French indologist Gérard Fussman in 1993. The inscription is in Brahmi script, and is significant because it mentions that it was made in Year 116 of the Yavanarajya ("Kingdom of the Yavanas"), and proves the existence of a "Yavana era" in ancient India. It may mean that Mathura was a part of a Yavana dominion, probably Indo-Greek, at the time the inscription was created.

== Inscription ==
The Yavanarajya inscription is in Brahmi script and describes a dedication for a well and a tank in Mathura on "The last day of year 116 of Yavana dominion (Brahmi script: 𑀬𑀯𑀦𑀭𑀚𑁆𑀬 Yavanarajya)". Although the term "Yavanas" are transliterations of the Greek word for "Ionians" (Ancient Greek: Ἴωνες < Ἰάoνες < *Ἰάϝoνες), who were probably the first Greeks to be known in India, inscriptions made at this early period generally use the term Yavana to refer to the Indo-Greeks, and known inscriptions referring to the Indo-Parthians or Indo-Scythians in Mathura never use the term Yavana. The date mentioned on the stone was the Hindu festival day of Holi, according to the Hindu calendar.

=== Date ===
The year 116 probably refers to the Yavana era (yonana vasaye), thought to begin in 186-185 BCE based on Bajaur reliquary inscription which gives an equivalence between the Yavana era and the Azes era. The inscription would thus have a date of 70 or 69 BCE. Some other authors have also suggested the date is counted in the Maues era (circa 80 BCE) or the Azes era (circa 57 BCE), but these have never been referred to as "Yavana era" in any other inscription.

Harry Falk and others have suggested that the Yavana era actually started in 174 BCE, based on a reevaluation of the Azes era which is now thought to have started in 47/46 BCE. This reevaluation of the start of the Yavana era means that the Yavanarajya inscription dates to 58 BCE.

=== Content ===
The Yavanarajya inscription, written in elegant Sanskrit, reads:

Yavanarajya inscription
Translation
(English)

On this day, the year one hundred sixteen, 116, of the Yavana kingdom, in the fourth month of winter on the thirtieth day...
[This is] the well and tank of Ahogani, the mother of the merchant Virabala, who was the son of Ghosadatta, a Brahmin of the Maitreya clan (gotra), with [her] son Virabala, daughter-in-law Bhaguri, and grandsons Suradatta, Rsabhadeva, and Viraddata.

May (their) merit increase

— Mathura Yavanarajya inscription, Translated by Sonya Rhie Quintanilla

Transliteration
(original Brahmi script)

𑀬𑀯𑀦𑀭𑀚𑁆𑀬𑀲𑁆𑀬 𑀱𑁄𑀟𑀰𑁄𑀢𑁆𑀢𑀭𑁂 𑀯𑀭𑁆𑀱𑀰𑀢𑁂 𑁤𑁛𑁗 𑀳𑁂𑀫𑀢 𑀫𑀸𑀲𑁂 𑁕 𑀤𑀯𑀲𑁂 𑁝 𑀏𑀢𑀬𑁂 𑀧𑀼𑀭𑁆𑀯𑀬𑁂
Yavanarajyasya ṣoḍaśottare varṣaśate 100 10 6 hemata māse 4 divase 30 etaye purvaye
𑀩𑁆𑀭𑀸𑀳𑁆𑀫𑀡𑀲𑁆𑀬 𑀫𑁃𑀢𑁆𑀭𑁂𑀬𑀲 𑀕𑁄𑀢𑁆𑀭𑀲𑁆𑀬 𑀖𑁄𑀱𑀤𑀢𑁆𑀢 𑀧𑀼𑀢𑁆𑀭𑀲𑁆𑀬 𑀲𑀸𑀣𑀯𑀸𑀳𑀲𑁆𑀬 𑀯𑀻𑀭𑀩𑀮𑀲𑁆𑀬 𑀫𑀸𑀢𑀼𑀭𑀸𑀳𑁄𑀕𑀦𑀺𑀬 𑀉𑀤𑀧𑀸𑀦𑀺
brāhmaṇasya maitreyasa gotrasya ghoṣadatta putrasya sārthavāhasya vīrabalasya māturāhogaṇiya udapāni
𑀧𑀼𑀱𑁆𑀓𑀭𑀺𑀦𑀺 𑀲𑀳 𑀧𑀼𑀢𑁆𑀭𑁂𑀡 𑀯𑀻𑀭𑀩𑀮𑁂𑀦 𑀯𑀥𑀼𑀬𑁂 𑀪𑀸𑀕𑀼𑀭𑁂𑀬𑁂 𑀧𑁅𑀢𑁆𑀭𑁂𑀳𑀺 𑀘 𑀰𑀼𑀭𑀤𑀢𑁆𑀢𑁂𑀦 𑀭𑁆𑀱𑀪𑀤𑁂𑀯𑀦 𑀯𑀺𑀭𑀤𑀢𑁆𑀢𑁂𑀦 𑀘 𑀧𑀼𑀡𑁆𑀬𑀁 𑀯𑀭𑁆𑀥𑀢𑀼
puṣkariṇi saha putreṇa vīrabalena vadhuye bhāgureye pautrehi ca śuradattena ṛṣabhadevena viradattena ca puṇyam vardhatu

Inscription
(Sanskrit in the Brahmi script)

== Interpretation ==
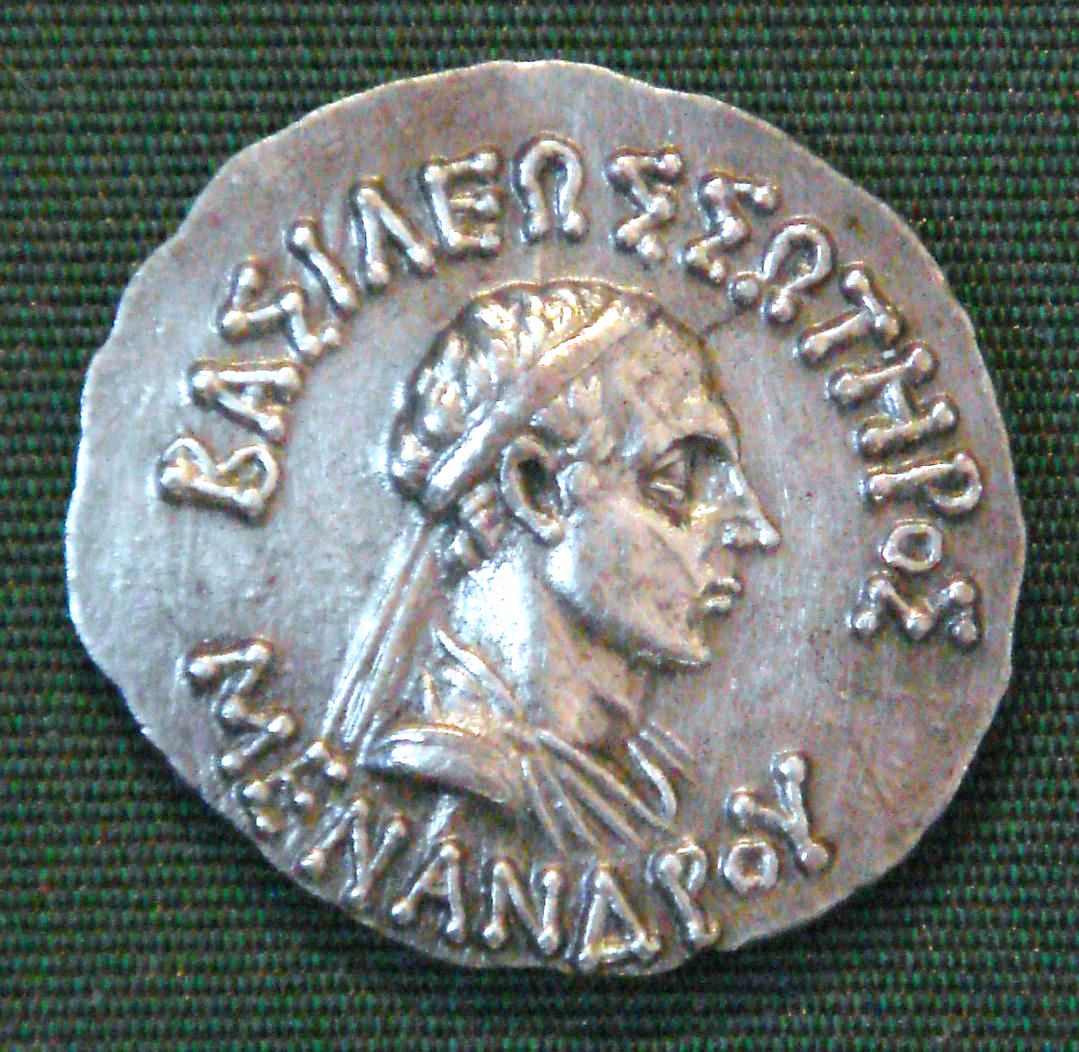
The Indo-Greek king Menander I.

The Yavanarajya inscription, states Sonya Rhie Quintanilla, mentions year 116 of the yavana hegemony (yavanarajya), attesting to the 2nd-century and 1st-century BCE Indo-Greek presence. This makes the inscription unique in that it mentions the Indo-Greeks, and it "may confirm" the numismatic and literary evidence which suggests that Mathura was under the ruler of the Indo-Greeks during the period between 185 BCE-85 BCE. It is unclear whether the Indo-Greeks were still present at the time the inscription was engraved, states Quintanilla. She states that the inscription's mention of a family of "Brahmin merchants" is significant as well and the foreign rule must have had a lasting impression on them.

Quintanilla states that the nearly contemporaneous coinage of Menander I (165-135 BCE) and his successors found in the Mathura region, in combination with this inscription, suggests the hypothesis that there was a tributary style relationship between the Indo-Greek suzerains and the Mitra dynasty that ruled that region at the time.
