= Hashtnagar =

Part of Charsadda District in Khyber Pakhtunkhwa, Pakistan

Coordinates: 34°12′59.24″N 71°42′53.26″E

Hashtnagar area, in Pakistan
Hashtnagar Buddha

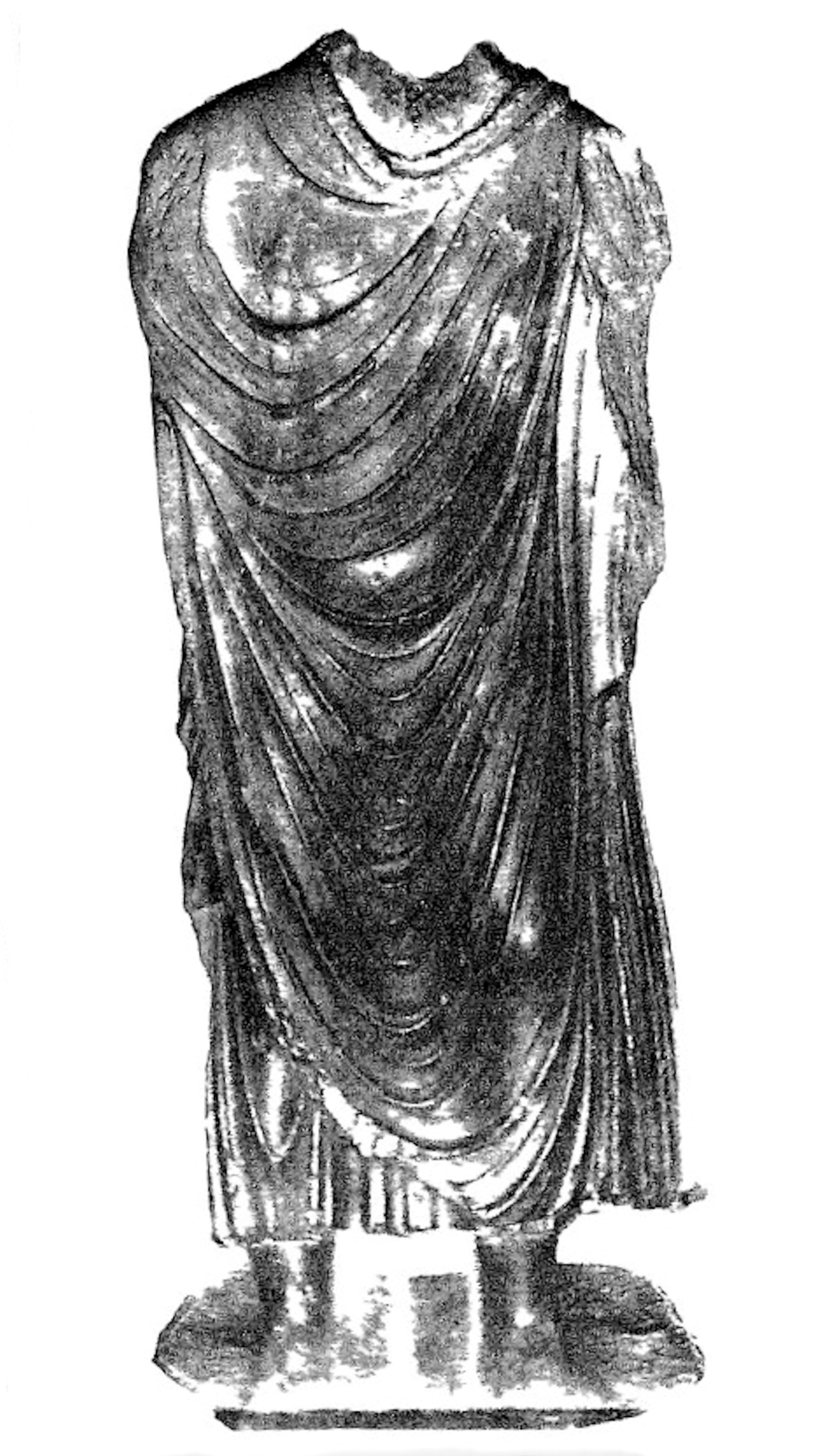
Statue of the Buddha from Palatu Dheri in Hashtnagar, inscribed of "the year 384", thought to belong to the Yavana era, which would be 209 CE.

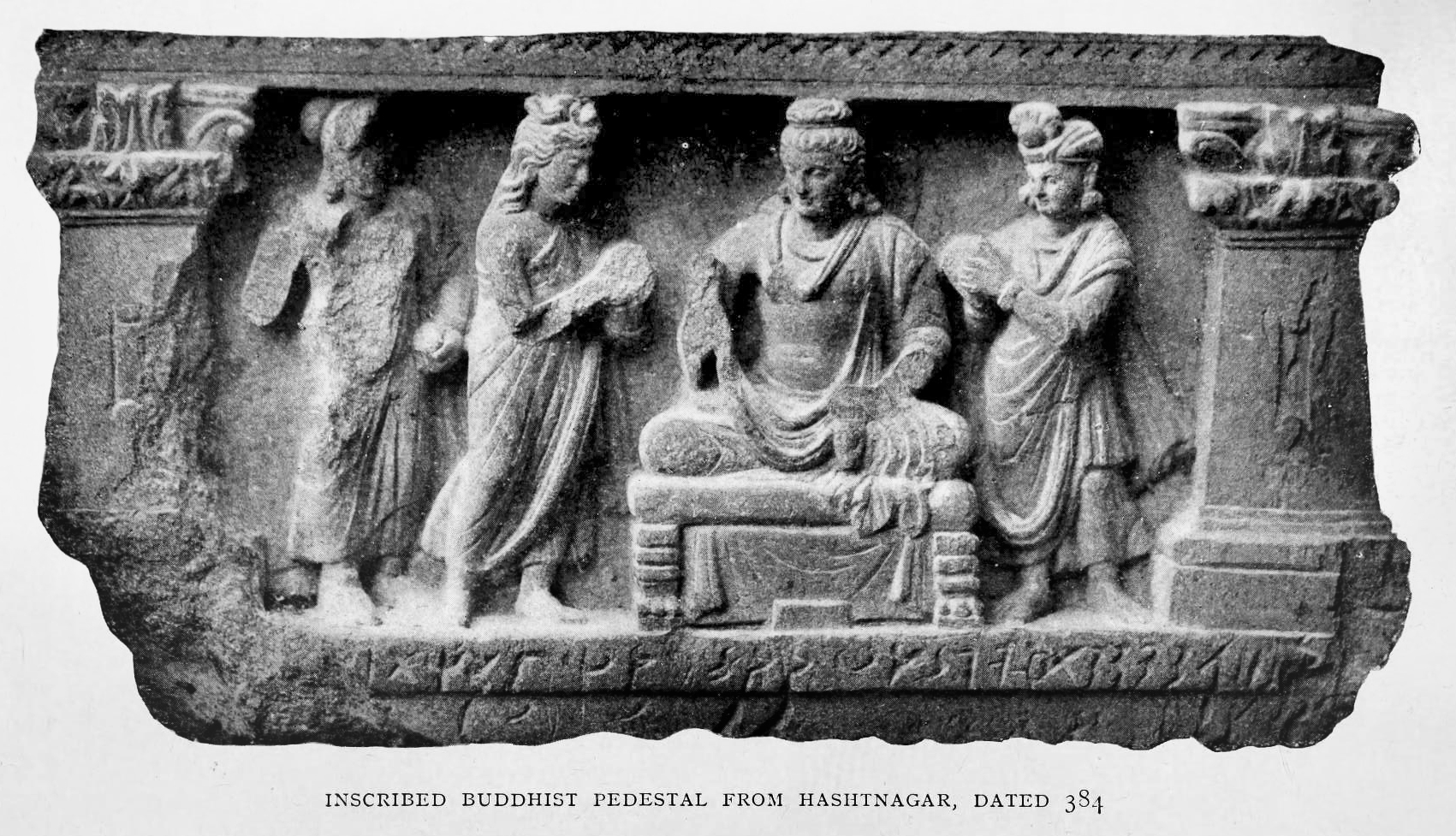
Piedestal of the same statue, with Year 384 inscription: sam 1 1 1 100 20 20 20 20 4 Prothavadasa masasa divasammi pamcami 4 1 ("In the year 384, on the fifth, 5, day of the month Prausthapada"). The pedestal was sawed off by L. White King in 1883 and brought to the British Museum.

Hashtnagar (Pashto: هشت نګر, more commonly known as اشنغر in Pashto) is one of the two constituent parts of the Charsadda District in Khyber Pakhtunkhwa. The name Hashtnagar is derived from the Sanskrit अष्टनगरम् Aṣṭanagaram, "eight towns", from Sanskrit aṣṭa, "eight" and नगर nagara, "settlement, locality, town". There was an unrelated town of the same name near Kabul in the 17th century. It was home to the Roshani Movement. The descriptive was later influenced by the Persian هشت hasht, "eight". The etymology "Eight Towns", refers to the eight major settlements situated in this region. These are:

- Chārsadda, Hashtnagar [Muhammadzai and Kheshgi]
- Prang (the 1812 list groups Prang with Chārsadda)
- Rajjar, Chārsadda
- Sherpao, Chārsadda
- Tangi, Chārsadda
- Turangzai, Chārsadda
- Umarzai, Chārsadda
- Utmanzai, Chārsadda
- Dargai, Chārsadda

== History ==
=== Buddhist period ===
Hashtnagar is known for an early Buddhist statue. The name Hashtnagar is derived from the Sanskrit Aṣṭanagaram, aṣṭa meaning "eight" and nagaram meaning "town".

=== Modern era ===
In 1812 the Asiatick Society (Calcutta, India) described the Gujars of Afghanistan as brave, mainly pastoral, and numerous in Hashtnagar district. The Muhammadzai (Charsadda) and Kheshgi were also mentioned as powerful tribes in the area.

== Media ==
A documentary, exploring the political and cultural life of Hashtnagar, has been made by Ammar Aziz which is the first ever film on the subject. It features the local artists and political activists and romanticizes the communist movement of the area.

== Notable people ==
- Bacha Khan
- Major General Akbar Khan
- Abdul Wali Khan
- Abdul Ghani Khan
- Dr. Khan Sahib
- Lieutenant General Imran Ullah Khan
- Asfandyar Wali Khan
- Hayat Muhammad Khan Sherpao
- Rustam Shah Mohmand

== See also ==
- Babrra massacre
