= Indo-Scythian art =

Art flourished during reign of Indo-Scythian rulers in Pakistan and northwestern India

Indo-Scythian art

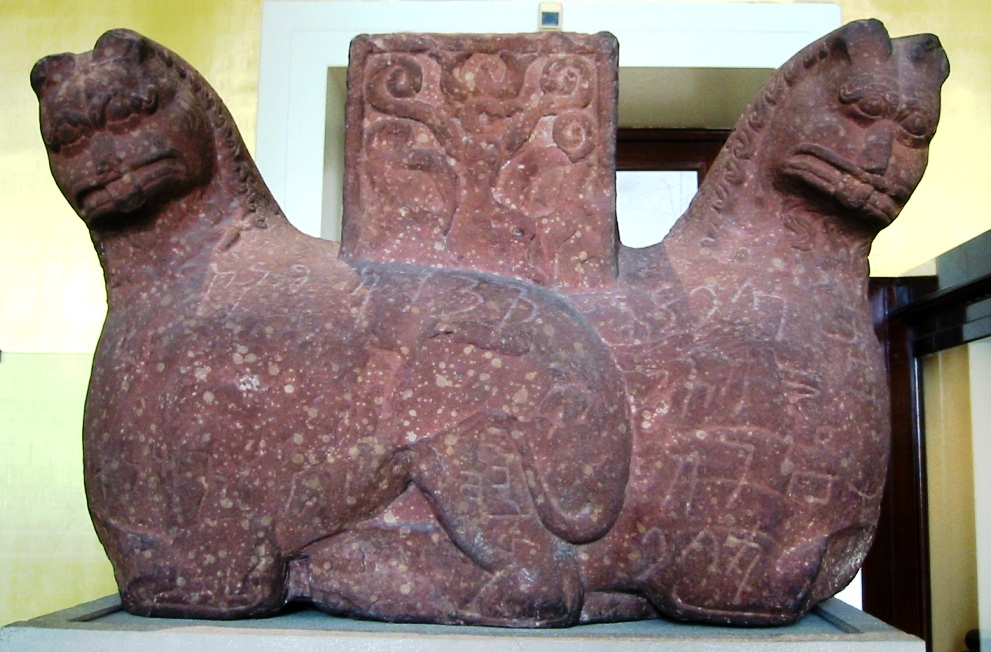
The Mathura lion capital, a dynastic production, advertising the rule of Rajuvula and his relatives, as well as their sponsorship of Buddhism. 2 BCE-6 CE.

Location of the Scythians in India: early Indo-Scythians, Northern Satraps and Western Satraps, over a period from the 1st century BCE to the early 5th century CE.

Indo-Scythian art developed under the various dynasties of Indo-Scythian rulers in Pakistan and northwestern India, from the 1st century BCE to the early 5th century CE, encompassing the productions of the early Indo-Scythians, the Northern Satraps and the Western Satraps. It follows the development of Indo-Greek art in northwestern India. The Scythians in India were ultimately replaced by the Kushan Empire and the Gupta Empire, whose art form appear in Kushan art and Gupta art.

== Early Indo-Scythian art (1st century BCE) ==
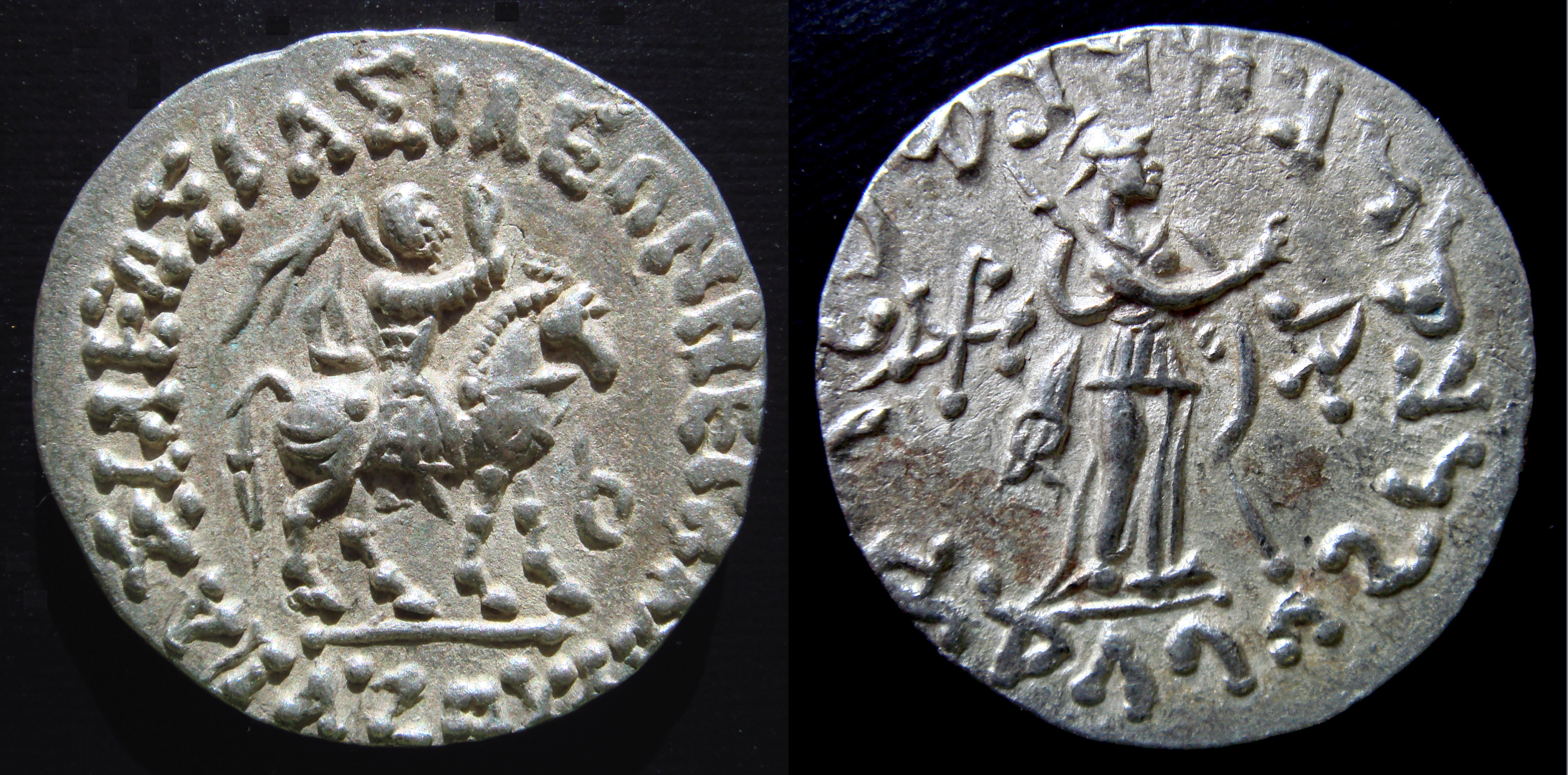
A coin of the Indo-Scythian king Azes, 1st century BCE.

In the 1st century BCE, the Indo-Scythians established a kingdom in the northwest, based near Taxila, replacing the Indo-Greeks. They then expanded to Mathura in the east, and to Surastrene (Gujarat) in the southwest.

=== Gandhara and Punjab ===
The presence of the Scythians in north-western India during the 1st century BCE was contemporary with that of the Indo-Greek Kingdoms there, and it seems they initially recognized the power of the local Greek rulers.

Maues first conquered Gandhara and Taxila around 80 BCE, but his kingdom disintegrated after his death. In the east, the Indian king Vikrama retook Ujjain from the Indo-Scythians, celebrating his victory by the creation of the Vikrama era (starting 58 BCE). Indo-Greek kings again ruled after Maues, and prospered, as indicated by the profusion of coins from Kings Apollodotus II and Hippostratos. Not until Azes I, in 55 BC, did the Indo-Scythians take final control of northwestern India, with his victory over Hippostratos.

==== Stone palettes ====
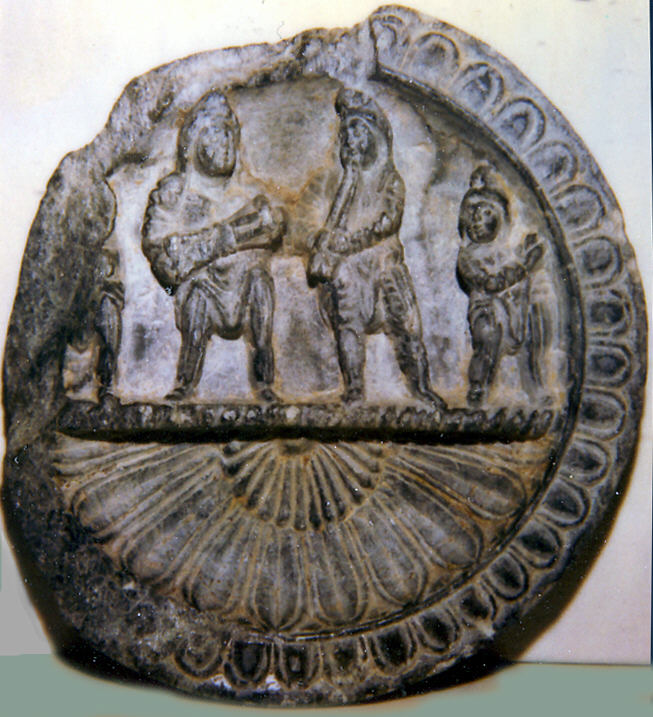
A stone palette of the type found in the Early Saka layer at Sirkap

Several stone sculptures have been found in the Early Saka layer (Layer No4, corresponding to the period of Azes I, in which numerous coins of the latter were found) in the ruins of Sirkap, during the excavations organized by John Marshall. Several of them are toilet trays (also called Stone palettes) roughly imitative of earlier, and finer, Hellenistic ones found in the earlier layers. Marshall comments that "we have a praiseworthy effort to copy a Hellenistic original but obviously without the appreciation of form and skill which were necessary for the task". From the same layer, several statuettes in the round are also known, in very rigid and frontal style.

==== Bimaran casket ====
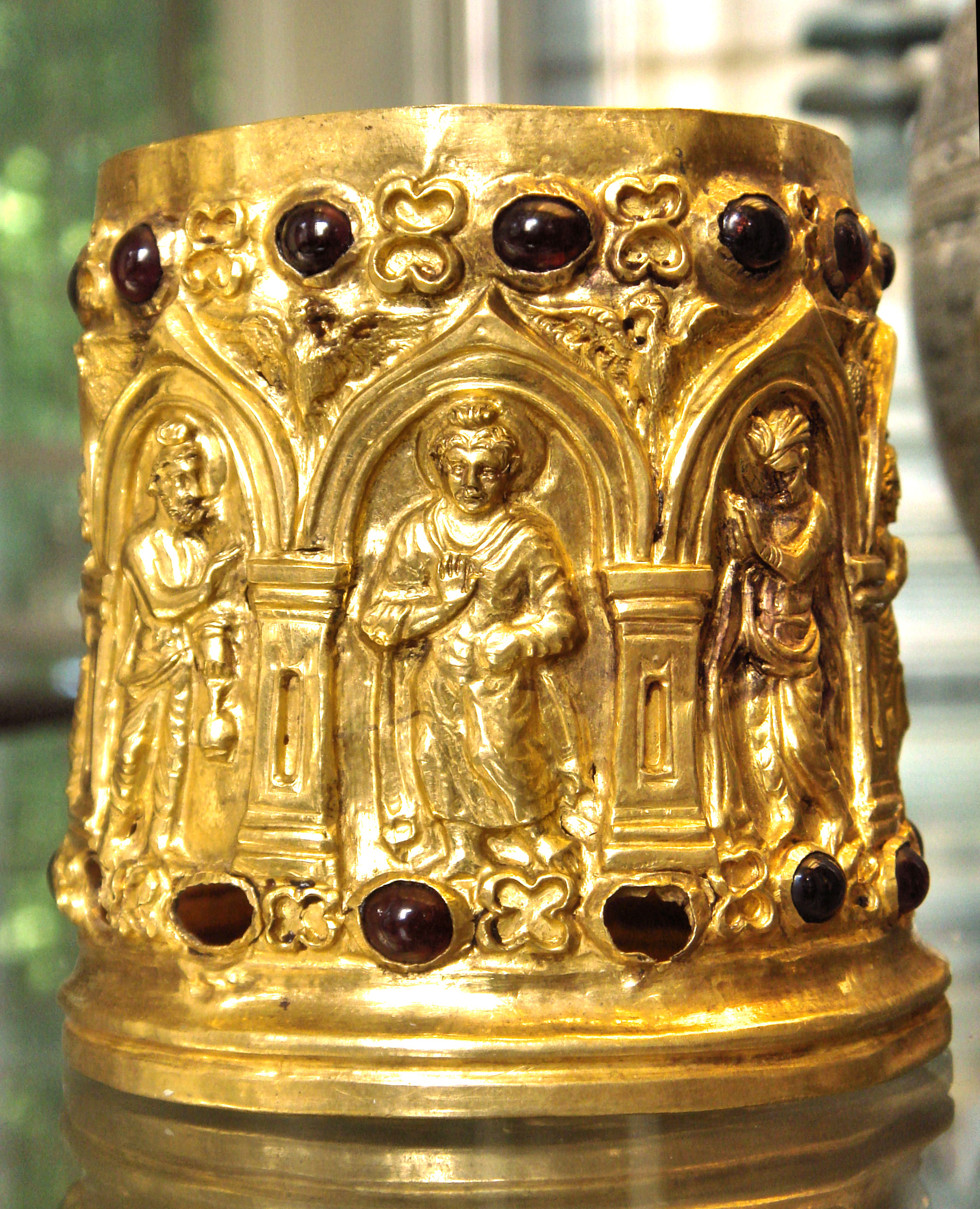
The Bimaran casket, representing the Buddha surrounded by Brahma (left) and Śakra (right) was found inside a stupa with coins of Azes inside. British Museum.

Azes is connected to the Bimaran casket, one of the earliest representations of the Buddha. Alternatively, the casket may have been dedicated by the slightly later Indo-Scythian ruler Kharahostes, or his son Mujatria. The casket was used for the dedication of a stupa in Bamiran, near Jalalabad in Afghanistan, and placed inside the stupa with several coins of Azes. This event may have happened during the reign of Azes (60–20 BCE), or slightly later. The Indo-Scythians are otherwise connected with Buddhism (see Mathura lion capital), and it is indeed possible they would have commended the work.

=== Buddhist monuments ===
Indo-Scythian soldiers in military attire are sometimes represented in Buddhist friezes in the art of Gandhara (particularly in Buner reliefs). They are depicted in ample tunics with trousers, and have heavy straight swords as weapons. They wear pointed hoods or the Scythian cap (see Pointed hat), which distinguishes them from the Indo-Parthians who only wore a simple fillet over their bushy hair, and which is also systematically worn by Indo-Scythian rulers on their coins. With the right hand, some of them are forming the Karana mudra against evil spirits. In Gandhara, such friezes were used as decorations on the pedestals of Buddhist stupas. They are contemporary with other friezes representing people in purely Greek attire, hinting at an intermixing of Indo-Scythians (holding military power) and Indo-Greeks (confined, under Indo-Scythian rule, to civilian life).

Another relief is known where the same type of soldiers are playing musical instruments and dancing, activities which are widely represented elsewhere in Gandharan art: Indo-Scythians are typically shown as reveling devotees.

Excavations at the Butkara Stupa in Swat by an Italian archaeological team have yielded various Buddhist sculptures thought to belong to the Indo-Scythian period. In particular, an Indo-Corinthian capital representing a Buddhist devotee within foliage has been found which had a reliquary and coins of Azes buried at its base, securely dating the sculpture to around 20 BC. A contemporary pilaster with the image of a Buddhist devotee in Greek dress has also been found at the same spot, again suggesting a mingling of the two populations. Various reliefs at the same location show Indo-Scythians with their characteristic tunics and pointed hoods within a Buddhist context, and side by side with reliefs of standing Buddhas.

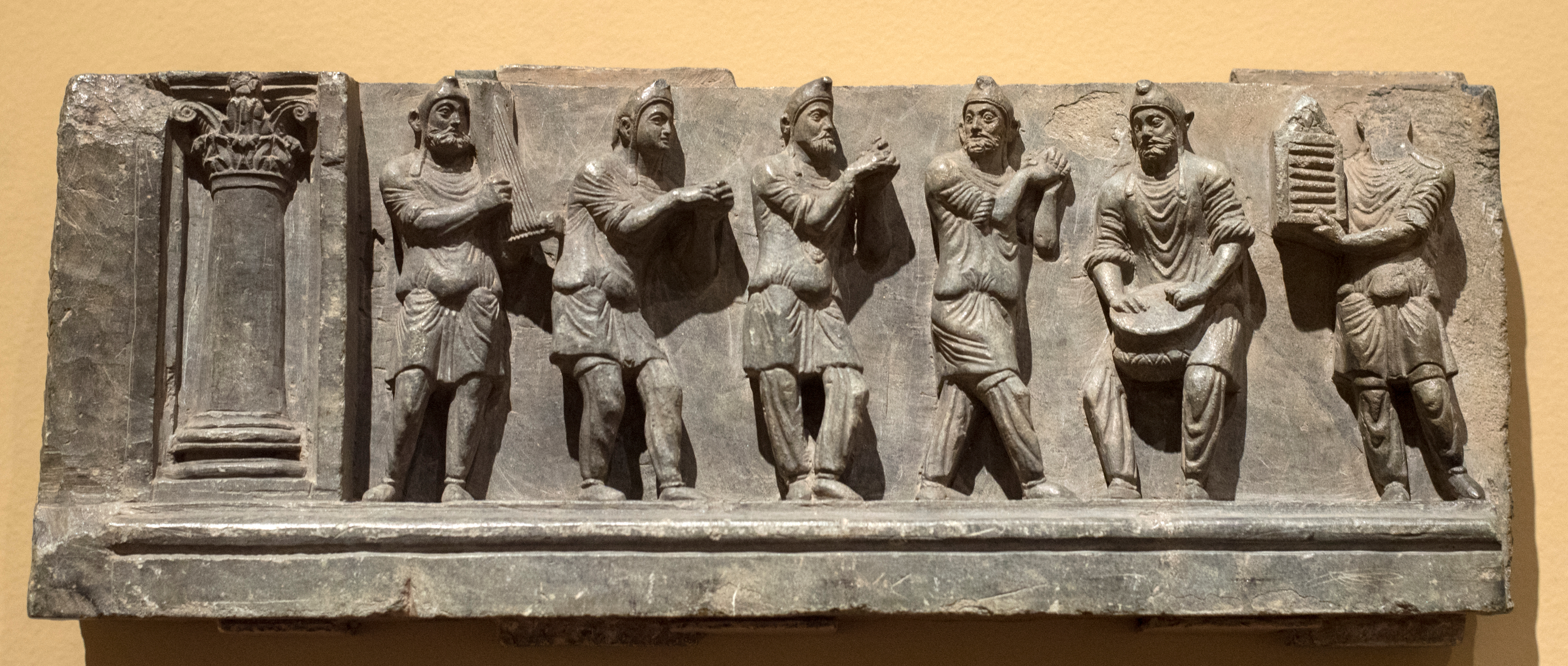
One of the Buner reliefs showing Scythian soldiers dancing. Cleveland Museum of Art.

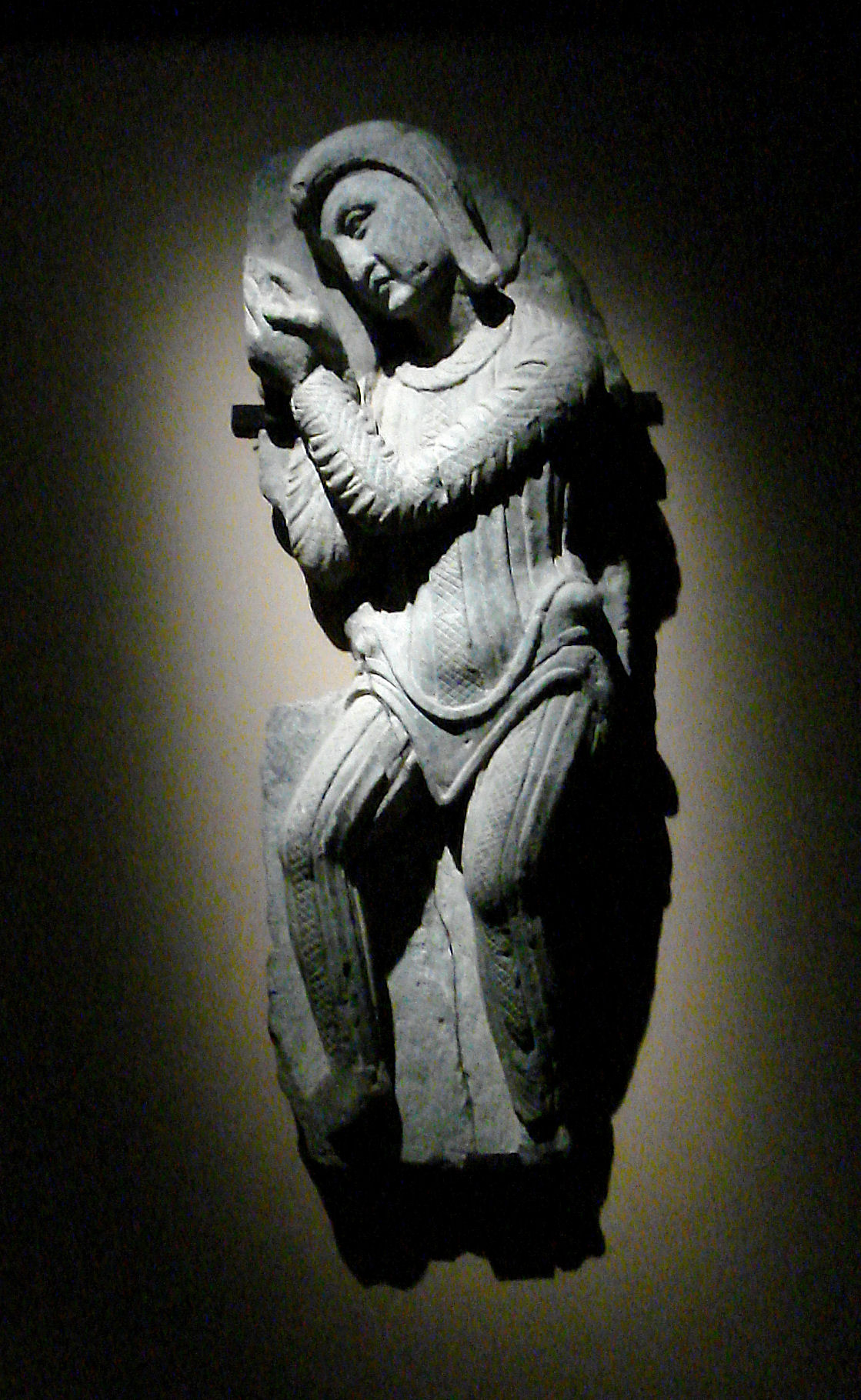
Scythian devotee, Butkara Stupa

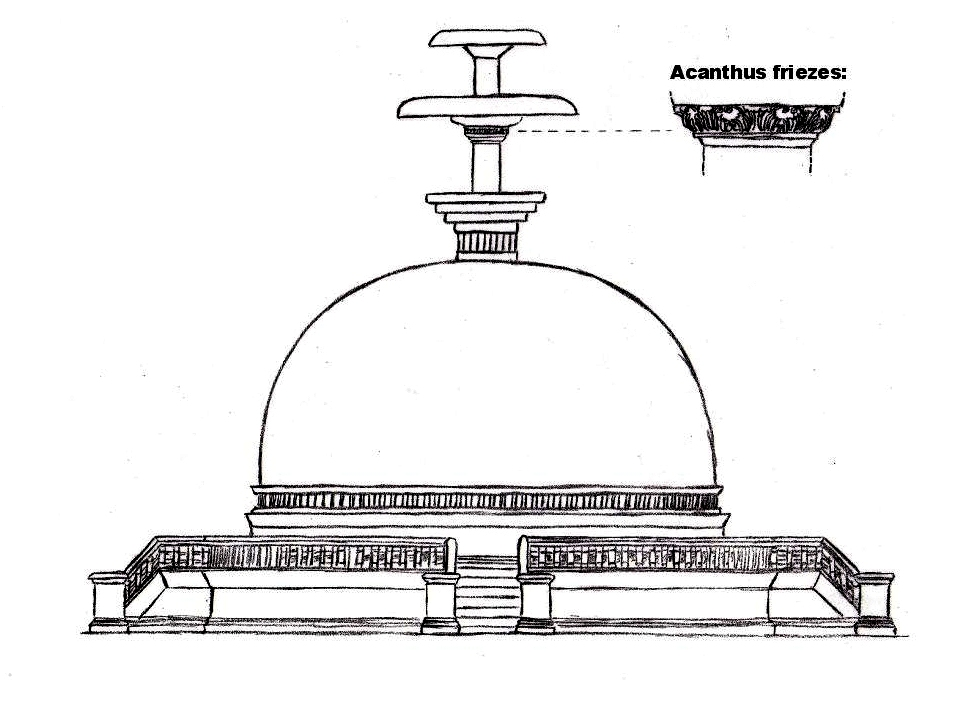
Highly decorated Buddhist stupas during the late Indo-Greek/Indo-Scythian period. Butkara stupa, Swat, 1st century BC.

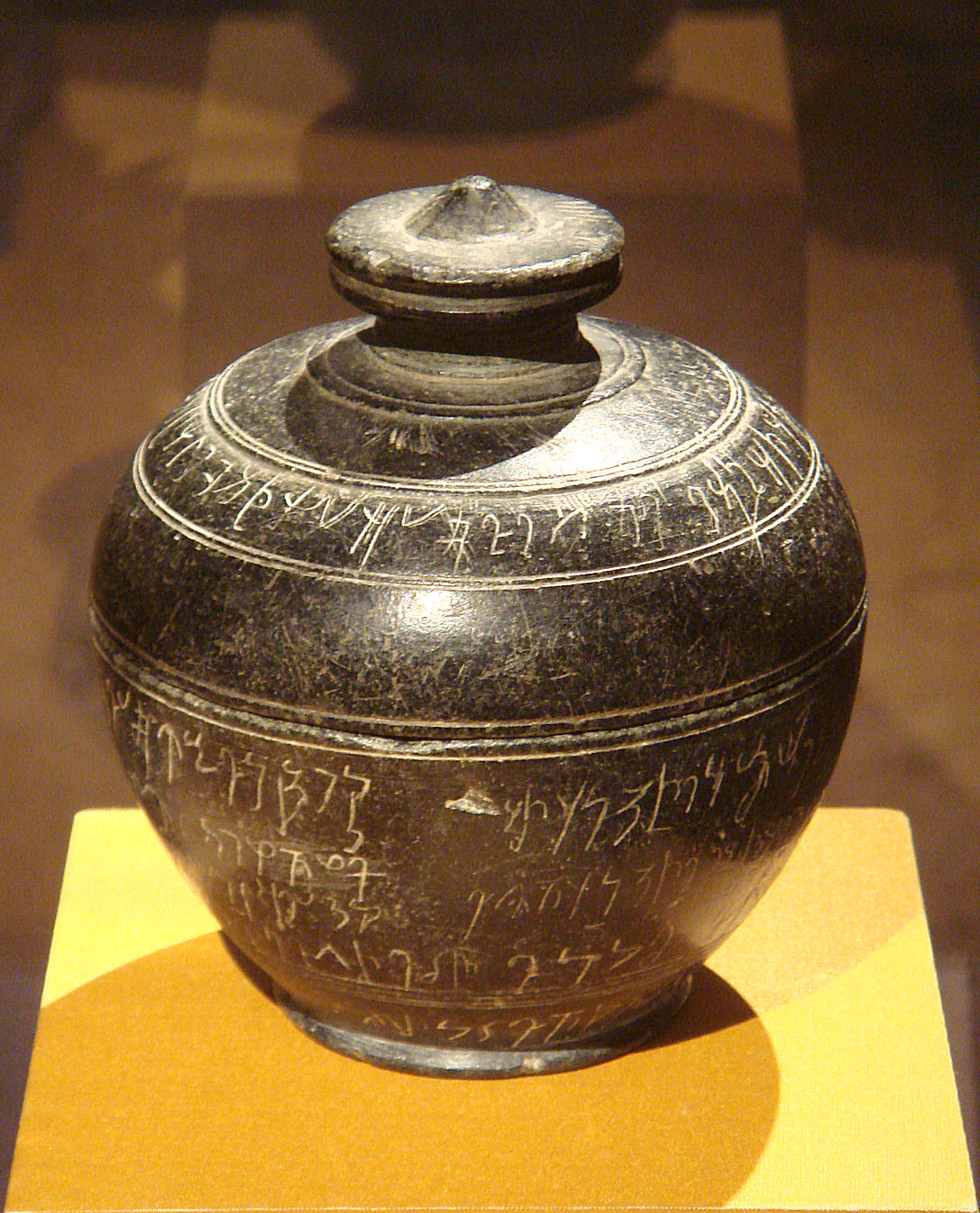
The Bajaur casket was dedicated by Indravarman, Metropolitan Museum of Art.

== Art of Mathura under the Northern Satraps (circa 60 BCE-90 CE) ==
From around 70 BCE, the region of Mathura fell to the Indo-Scythian Northern Satraps under Hagamasha, Hagana and then Rajuvula. During this time, Mathura is described as "a great center of Śaka culture in India". Little is known precisely from that period on terms of artistic creation. The Indo-Scythian Rajuvula, ruler of Mathura, created coins which were copies of the contemporary Indo-Greek ruler Strato II, with effigy of the king and representation of Athena on the obverse. Indo-Scythians are known to have sponsored Buddhism, but also other religions, as visible from their inscriptions and archaeological remains in northwestern and western India, as well as from their contributions to pre-Kushana sculpture in Mathura. Mathura became part of the Kushan Empire from the reign of Vima Kadphises (90-100 CE) and then became the southern capital of the Kushan Empire.

=== End of 1st century BCE ===
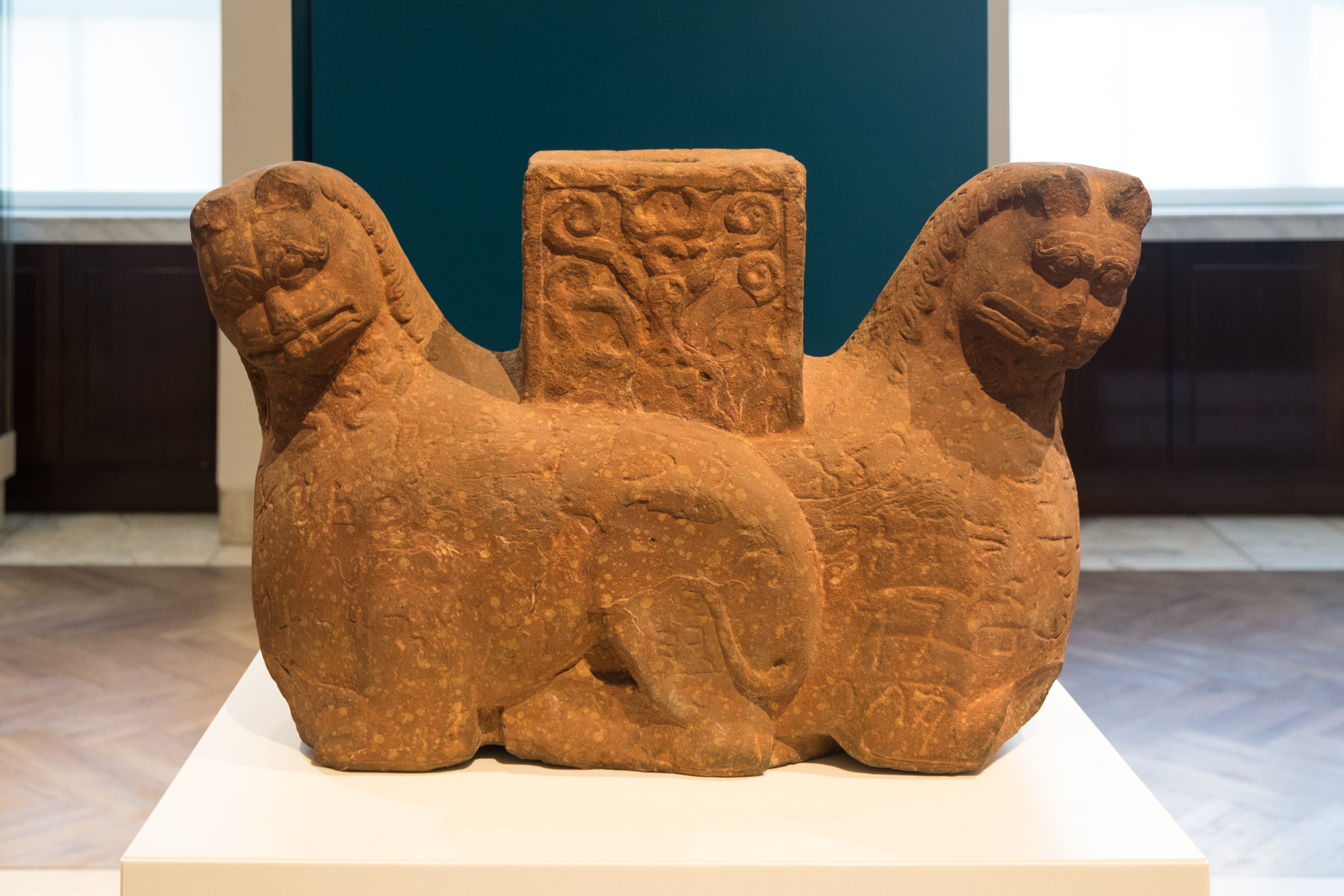
The Mathura lion capital on display in the Sir Joseph Hotung Gallery for China and South Asia, at the British Museum.

Some works of art dated to the end of the 1st century BCE show very delicate workmanship, such as the sculptures of Yakshis. At the very end of this period the Indo-Scythian ruler Rajuvula is also known for the famous Mathura lion capital which records events of the Indo-Scythian dynasty as well as their support of Buddhism. It is also an interesting example of the state of artistic attainment in the city of Mathura at the turn of our era. The capital portrays two lions reminiscent of the lions of the Pillars of Ashoka, but in a much cruder style. It also displays at its center a Buddhist triratna symbol, further confirming the involvement of Indo-Scythian rulers with Buddhism. The triratna is contained in a flame palmette, an element of Hellenistic iconography, and an example of Hellenistic influence on Indian art.

The fact that the Mathura lion capital is inscribed in Kharoshthi, a script used in the far northwest around the area of Gandhara, attests to the presence of northwestern artists at that time in Mathura.

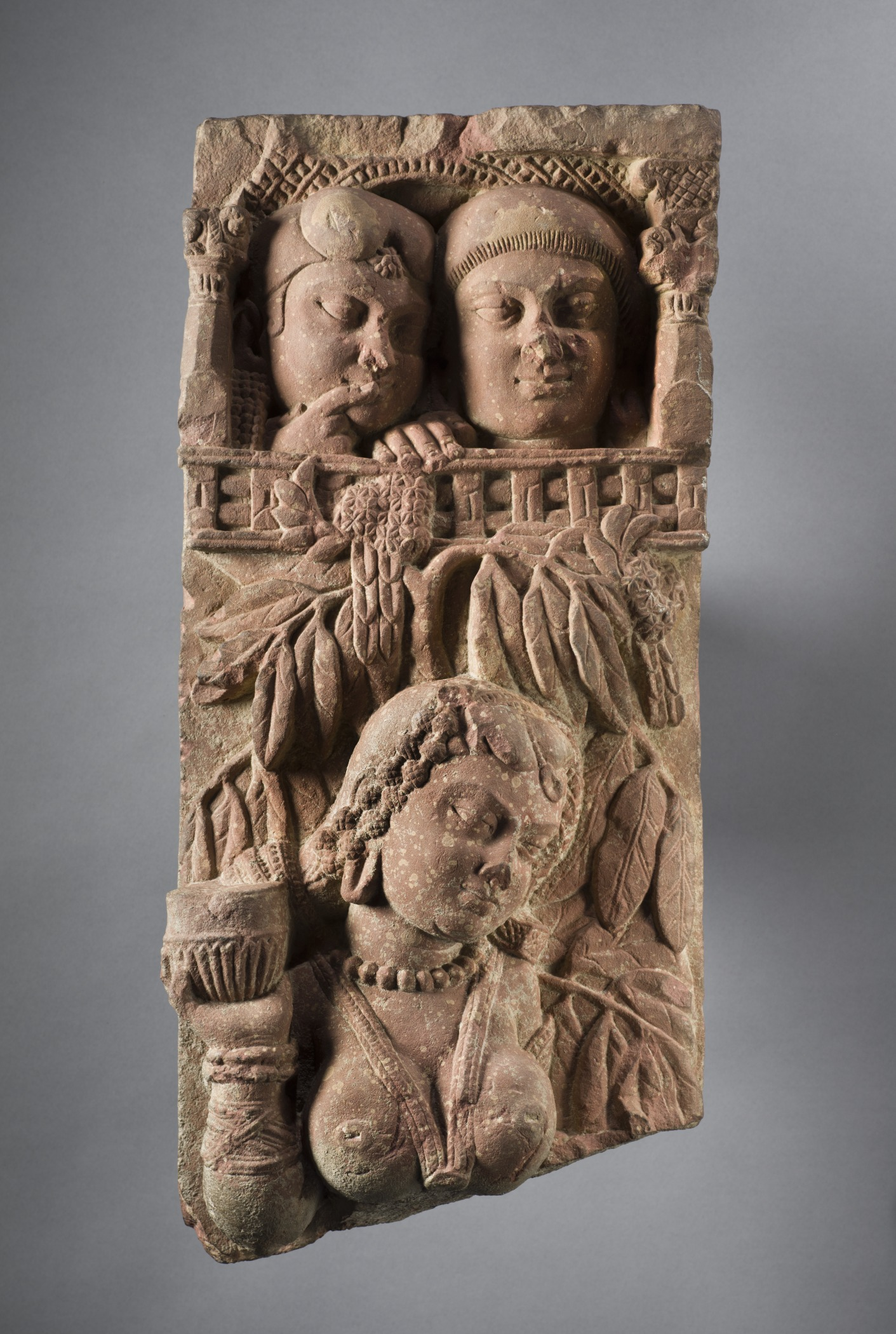
Yashi with onlookers, dated 20 BCE.

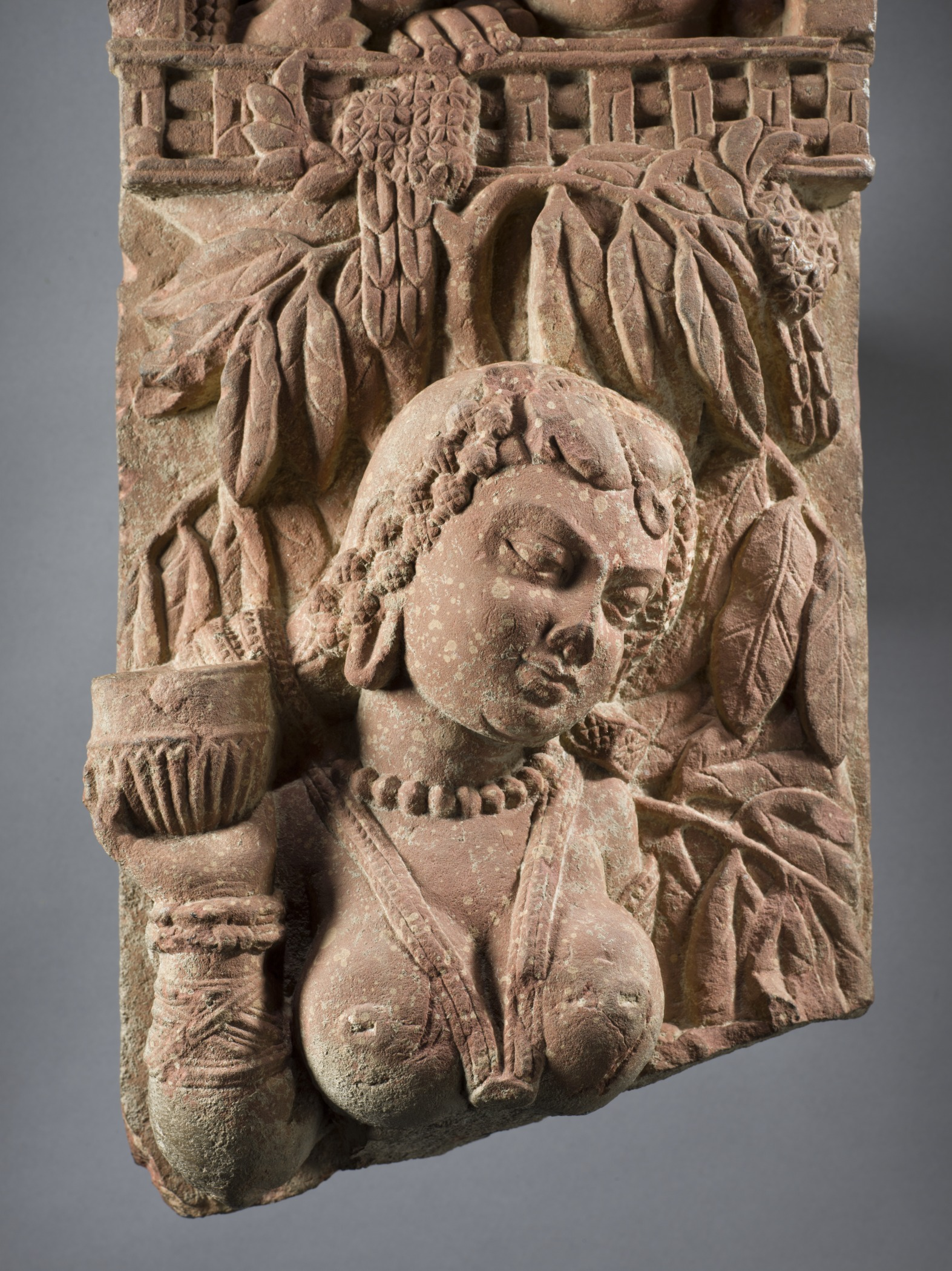
Yashi with onlookers (detail), dated 20 BCE.

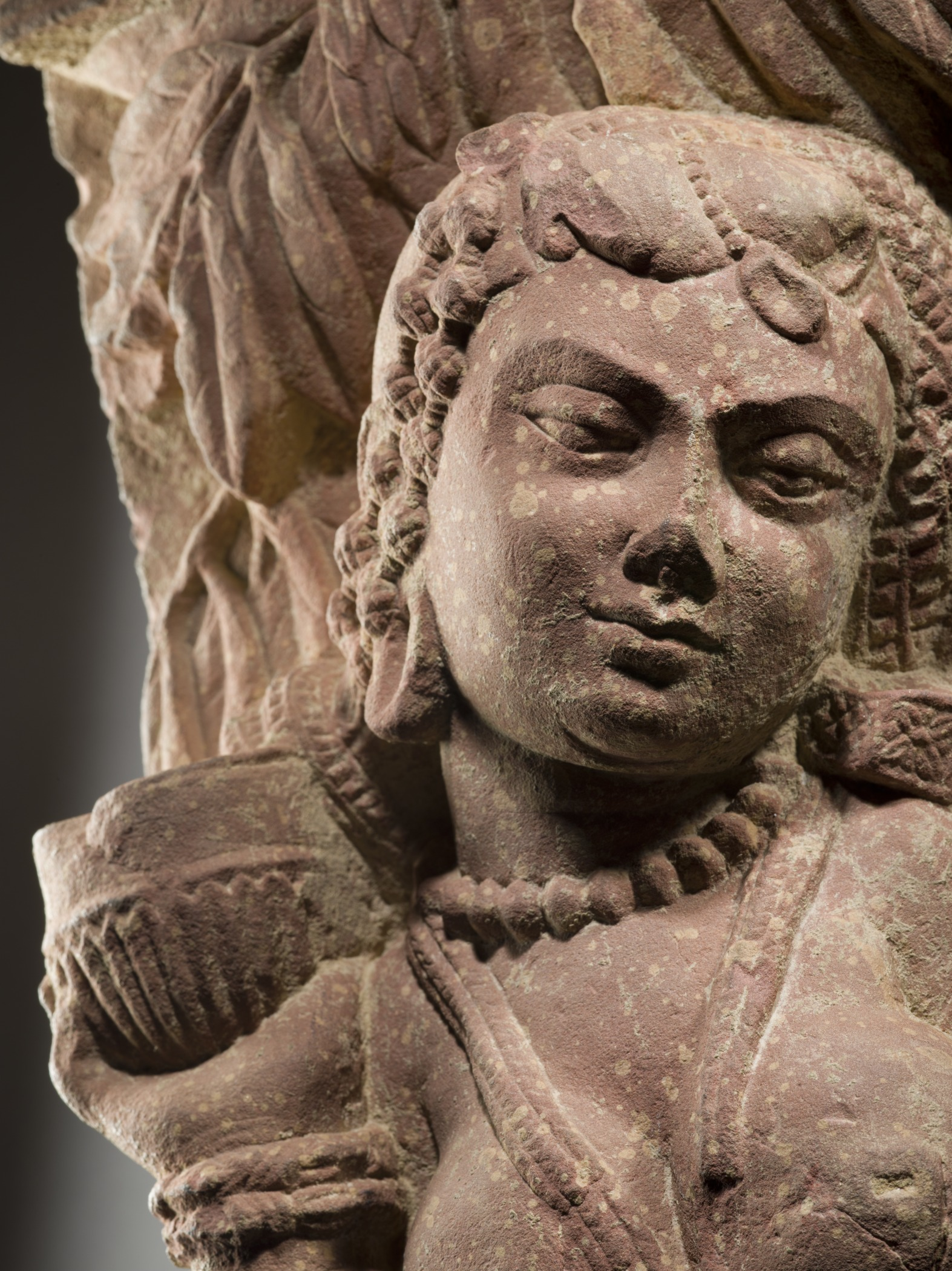
Yashi with onlookers (detail), dated 20 BCE.

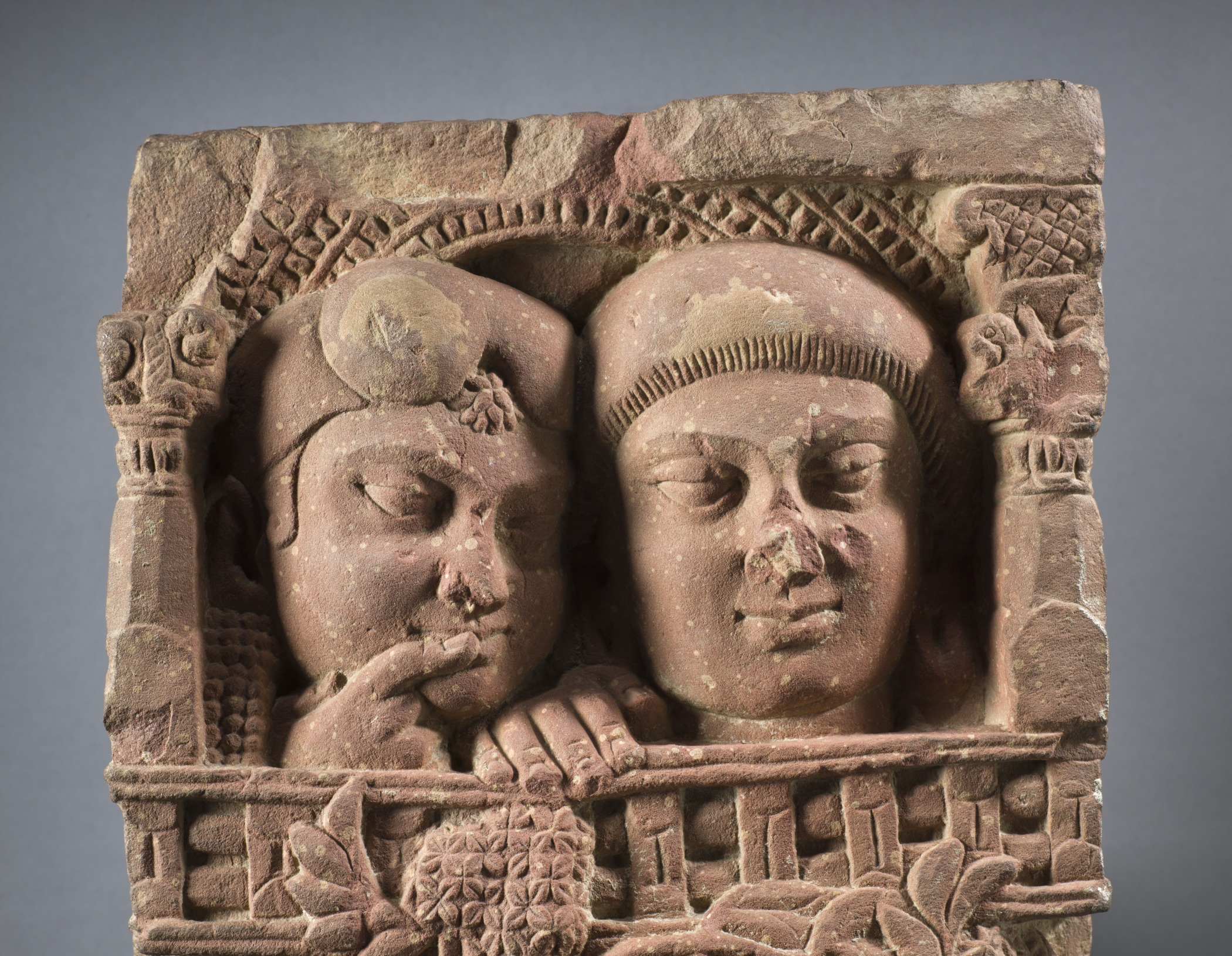
Yashi with onlookers (detail), dated 20 BCE.

=== Mathura sculpture styles in the 1st century CE ===
The abundance of dedicatory inscriptions in the name of Sodasa, the Indo-Scythian ruler of Mathura, and son of Rajuvula (eight such inscriptions are known, often on sculptural works), and the fact that Sodasa is known through his coinage as well as through his relations with other Indo-Scythian rulers whose dates are known, means that Sodasa functions as a historic marker to ascertain the sculptural styles at Mathura during his rule, in the first half of the 1st century CE. These inscriptions also correspond to some of the first known epigraphical inscriptions in Sanskrit. The next historical marker corresponds to the reign of Kanishka under the Kushans, whose reign began circa 127 CE. The sculptural styles at Mathura during the reign of Sodasa are quite distinctive, and significantly different from the style of the previous period circa 50 BCE, or the styles of the later period of the Kushan Empire in the 2nd century CE.

==== In-the-round statuary ====
Mora sculptures (c. 15 CE)
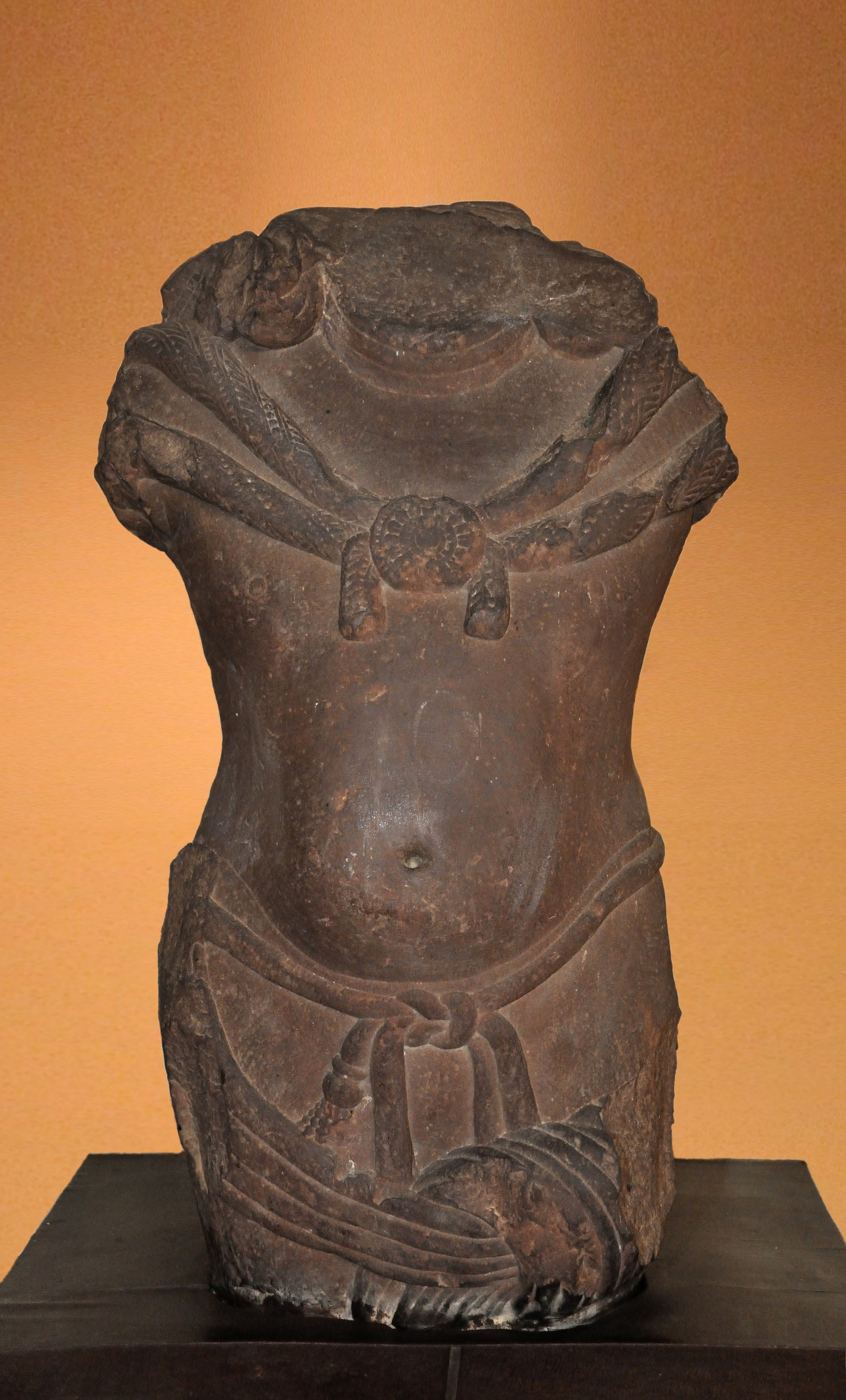
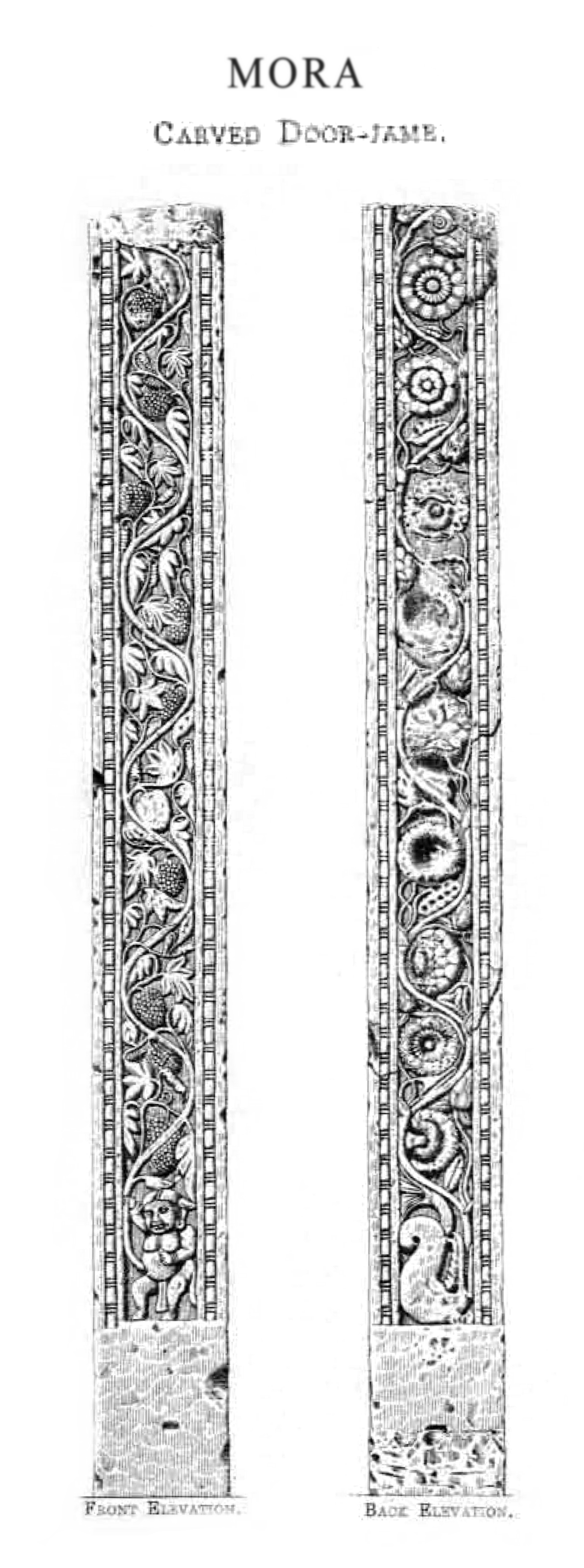
The Mora well inscription of Great Satrap Sodasa (15 CE) is associated with three statue remains and a decorated doorjamb, all thought to be related to a temple built for the Vrishni heroes. Left: torso said to be probably a figure of one of the five Vrishni heroes, Mora, circa 15 CE, Mathura Museum. Right: Mora carved doorjamb with grapevine design, also circa 15 CE.

Several examples of in-the-round statuary have been found from the period of Sodasa, such as the torsos of "Vrishni heroes", discovered in Mora, about 7 kilometers west of Mathura. These statues are mentioned in the Mora Well Inscription nearby, made in the name of the Northern Satrap Sodasa circa 15 CE, in which they are called Bhagavatam. The statue fragments are thought to represent some of the five Vrishni heroes, possibly ancient kings of Mathura later assimilated to Vishnu and his avatars, or, equally possible, the five Jain heroes led by Akrūra, which are well attested in Jain texts. In fact, the cult of the Vrishnis may have been cross-sectarian, much like the cult of the Yakshas.

The two uninscribed male torsos that were discovered are both of high craftsmanship and in Indian style and costume. They are bare-chested but wear a thick necklace, as well as heavy hearrings. The two torsos that were found are similar with minor variations, suggesting they may have been part of a series, which is coherent with the Vrishni interpretation. They share some sculptural characteristics with the Yaksha statues found in Mathura and dating to the 2nd and 1st century BCE, such as the sculpting in the round, or the clothing style, but the actual details of style and workmanship clearly belong to the time of Sodasa. The Vrishni statues also are not of the colossal type, as they would only have stood about 1.22 meters complete. The Mora Vrishnis function as an artistic benchmark for in-the-round statues of the period.

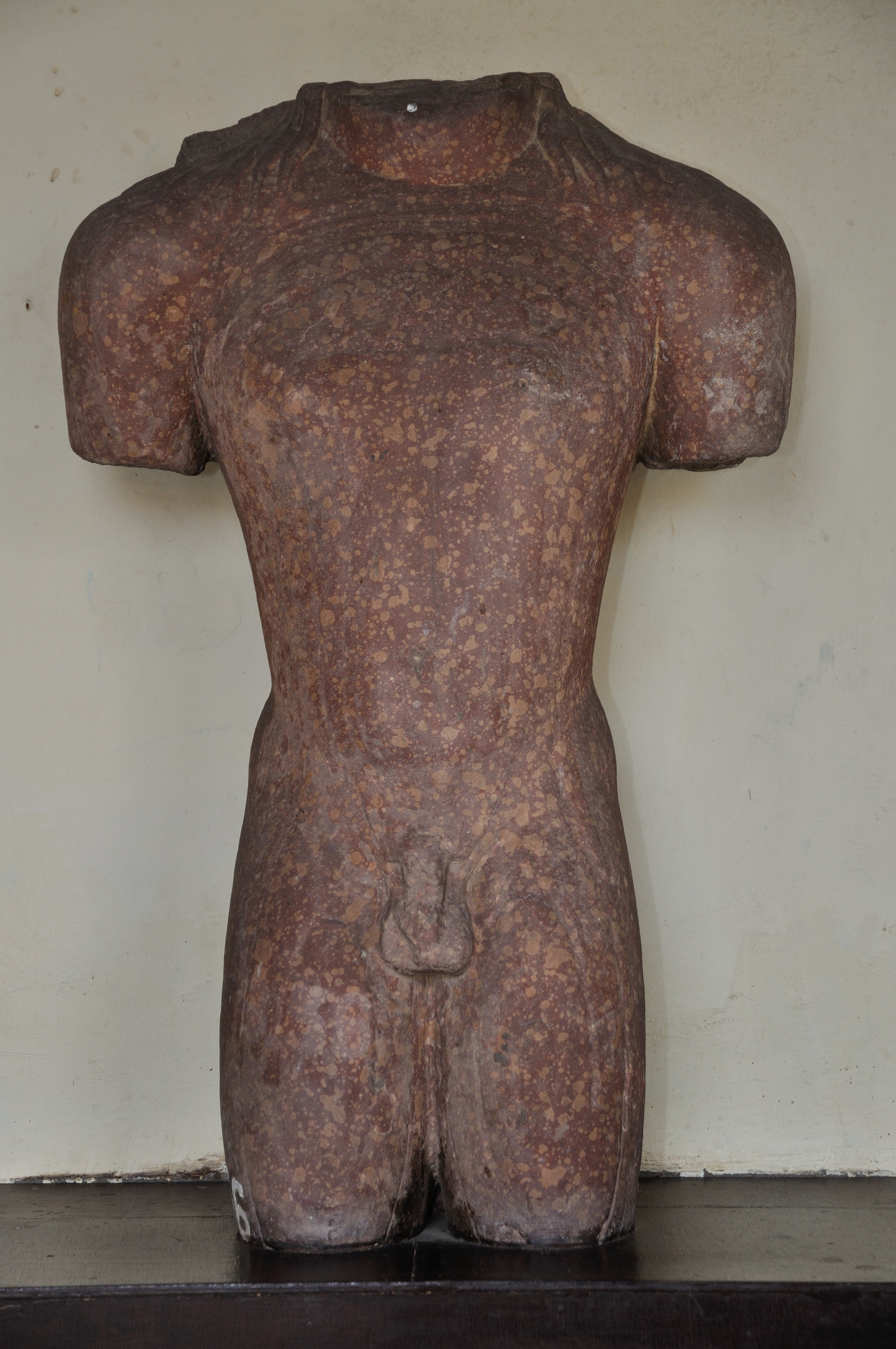
1st Jaina Tirthankara Rishabhanatha torso - Circa 1st Century

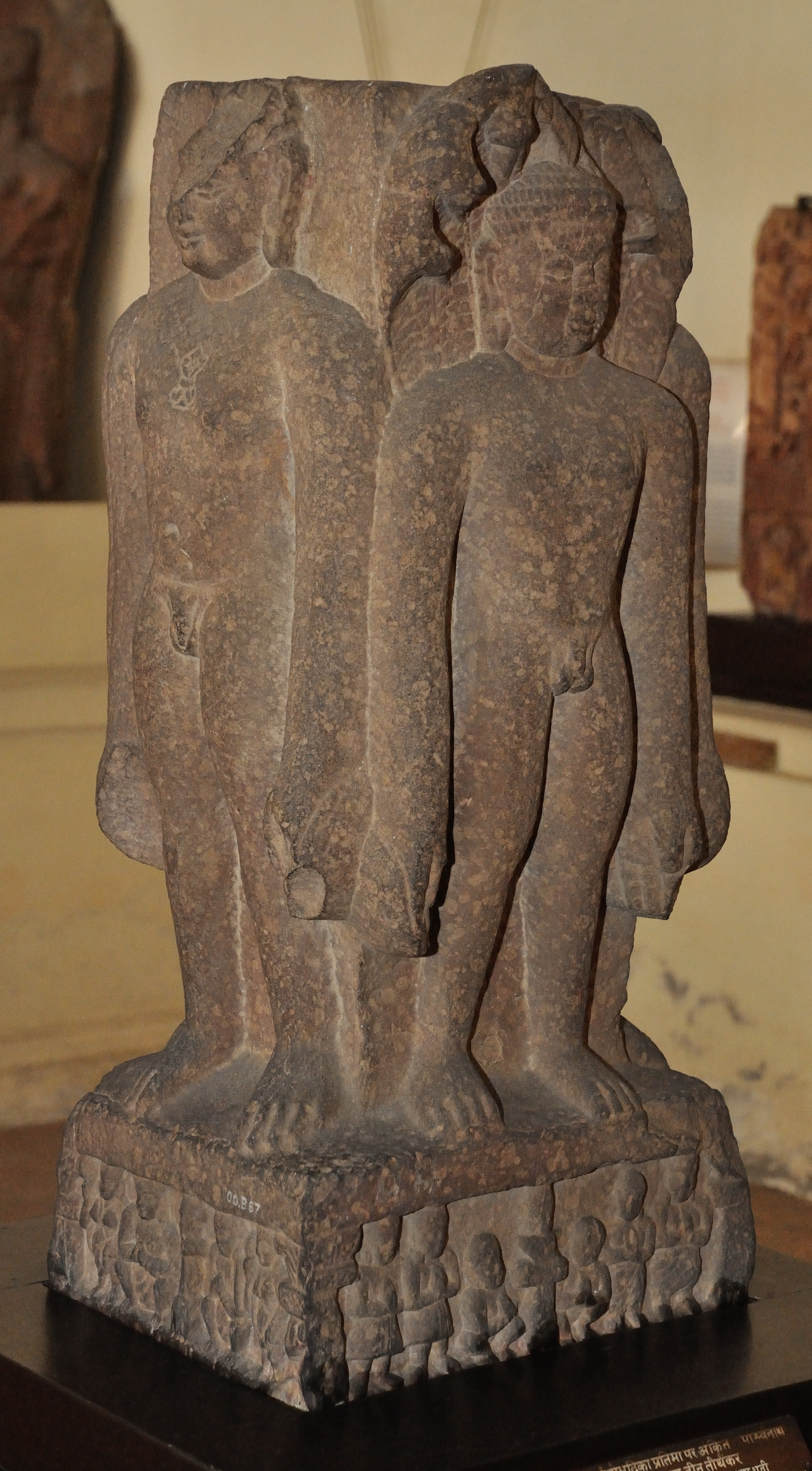
Four-fold Jain image with Suparshvanath and three other Tirthankaras - Circa 1st Century CE

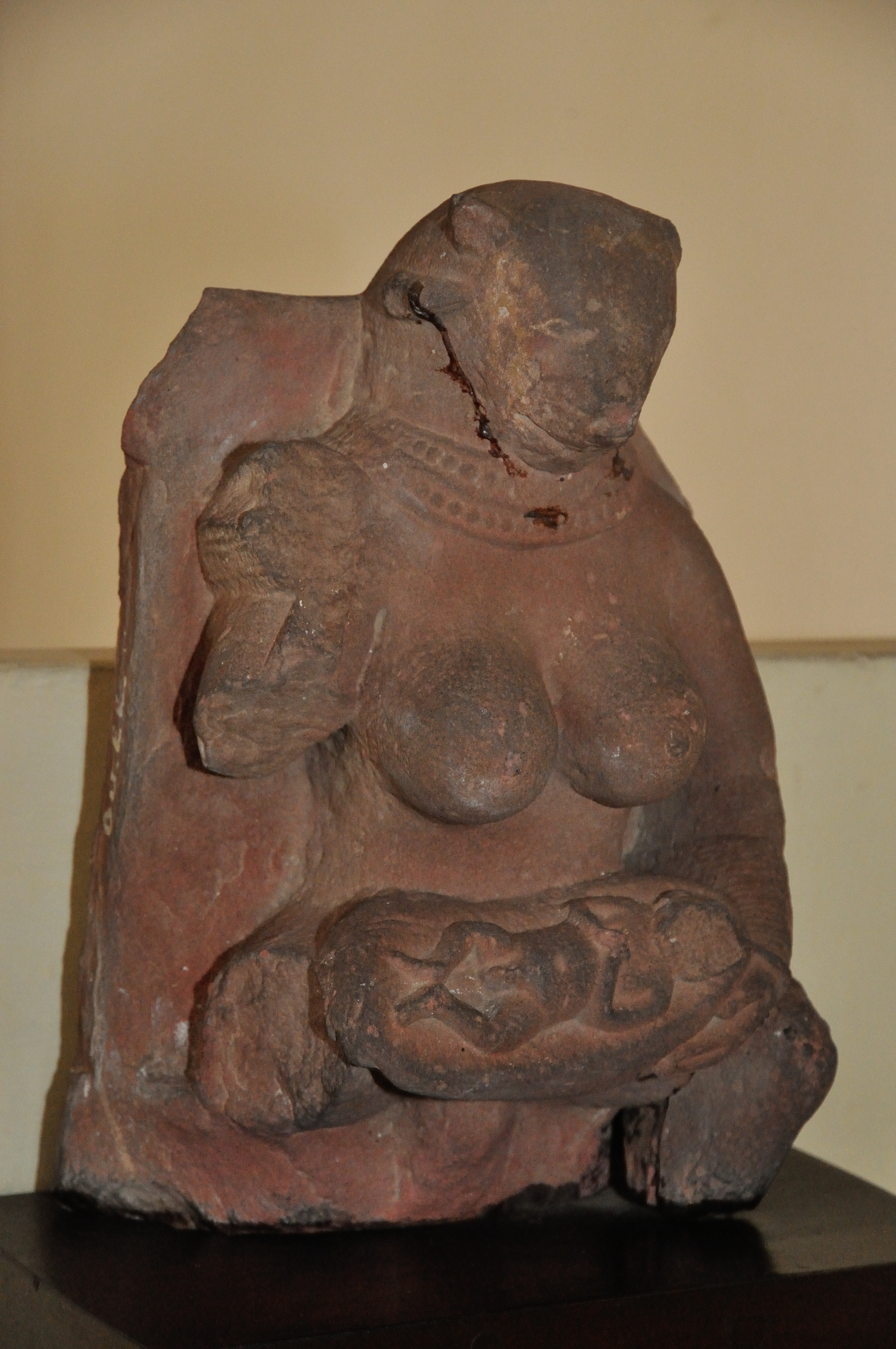
Goat-headed Jain Mother Goddess, circa 1st Century CE

==== Jain reliefs ====
Kankali Tila tablet of Sodasa

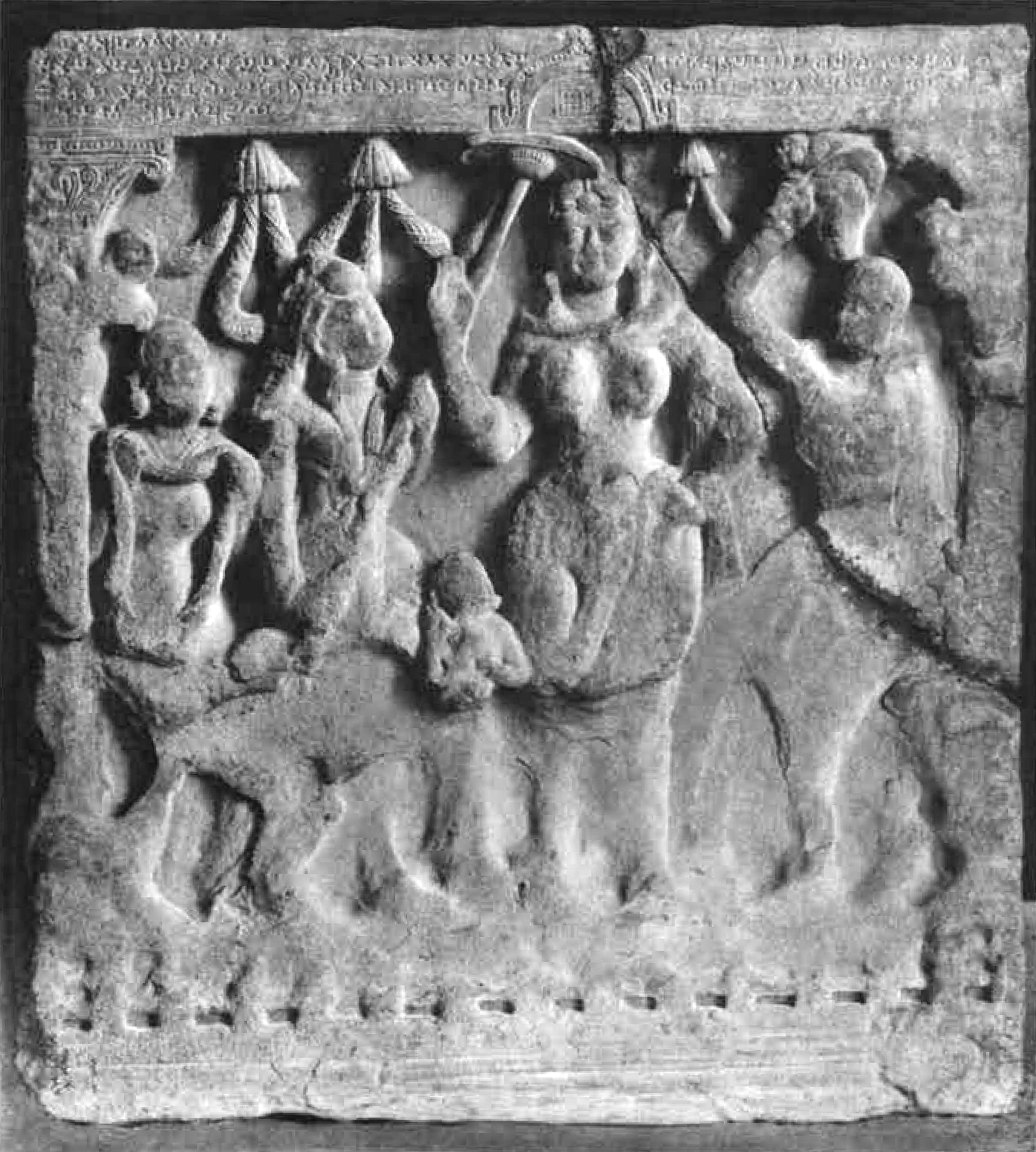
Jain Kankali Tila tablet of Sodasa or "Amohini relief", inscribed "in the reign of Sodasa", circa 15 CE. State Museum Lucknow, SML J.1

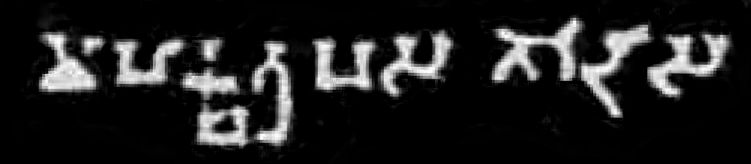
Brahmi inscription in the tablet:

Mahakṣatrapasa Śodāsa
"Great Satrap Sodasa"

Many of the sculptures from this period are related to the Jain religion, with numerous relief showing devotional scenes, such as the Kankali Tila tablet of Sodasa in the name of Sodasa. Most of these are votive tablets, called ayagapata.

Jain votive plates, called "Ayagapatas", are numerous, and some of the earliest ones have been dated to circa 50-20 BCE. They were probably prototypes for the first known Mathura images of the Buddha. Many of them were found around the Kankali Tila Jain stupa in Mathura.

Notable among the design motifs in the ayagapatas are the pillar capitals displaying "Persian-Achaemenian" style, with side volutes, flame palmettes, and recumbent lions or winged sphinxes.

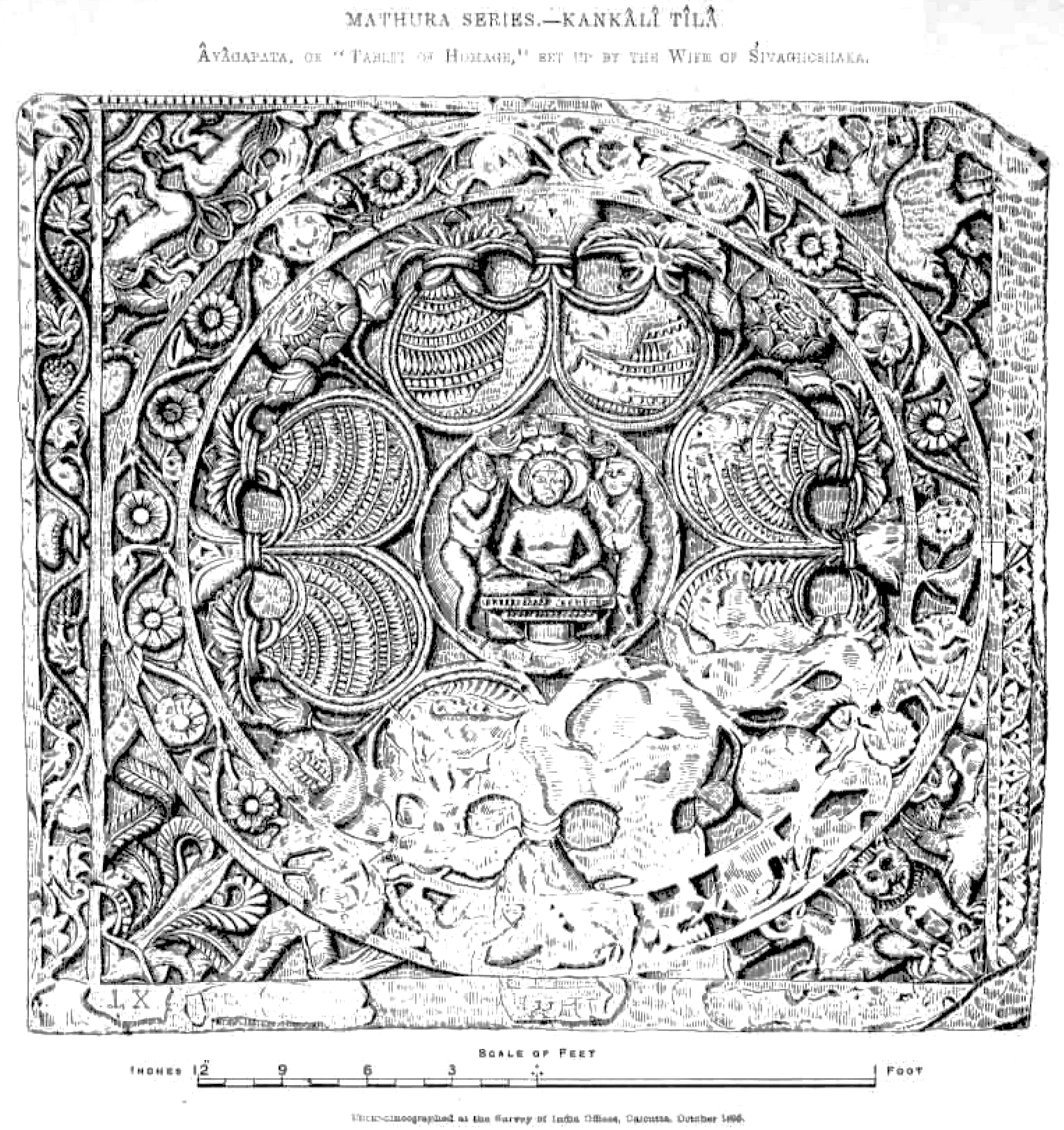
The Jina Parsvanatha ayagapata, Mathura circa 15 CE, Lucknow Museum.

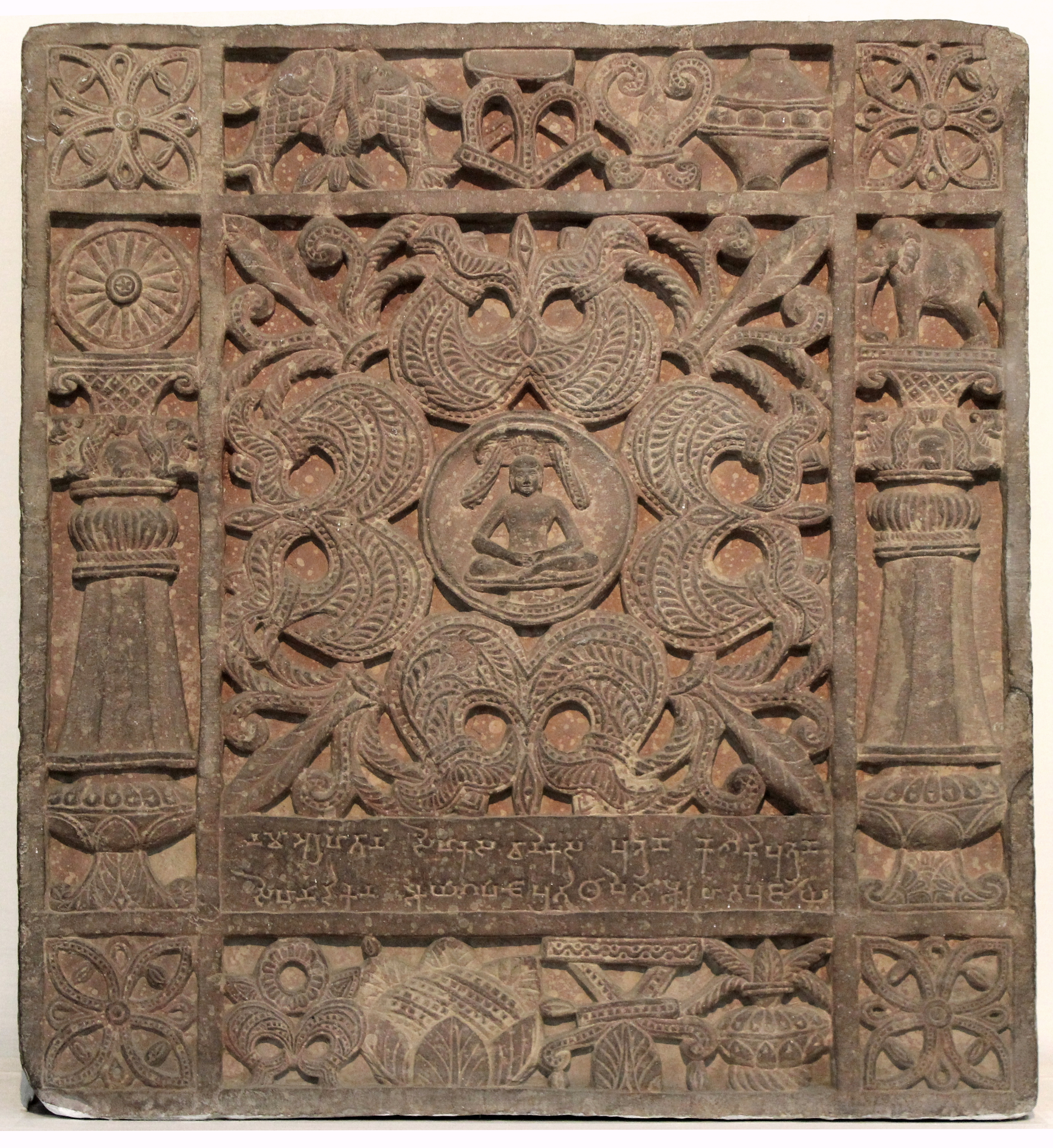
"Sihanāṃdikā ayagapata", Jain votive plate, dated 25-50 CE.

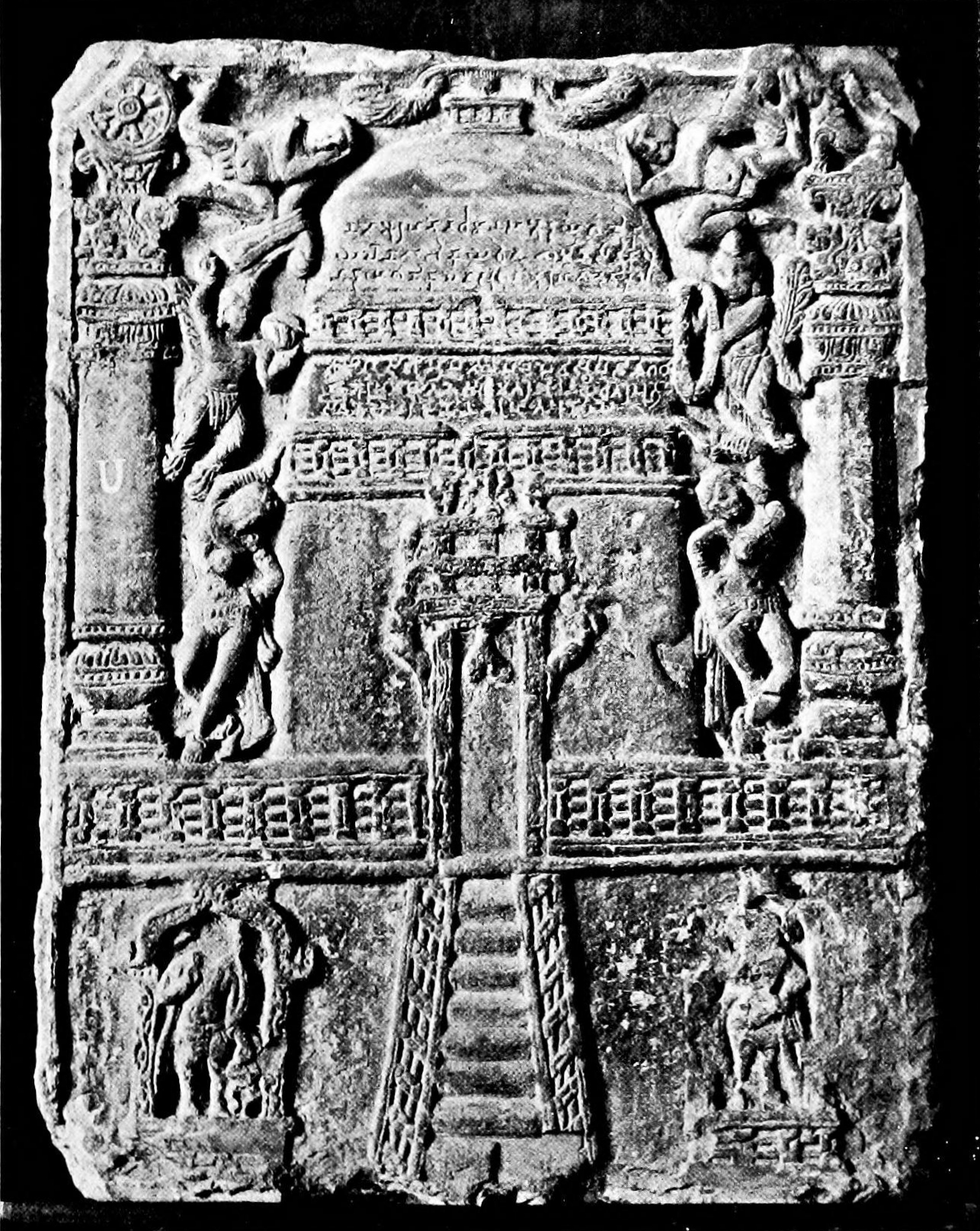
Jain votive plaque with Jain stupa, the "Vasu Śilāpaṭa" ayagapata, 1st century CE, excavated from Kankali Tila, Mathura.

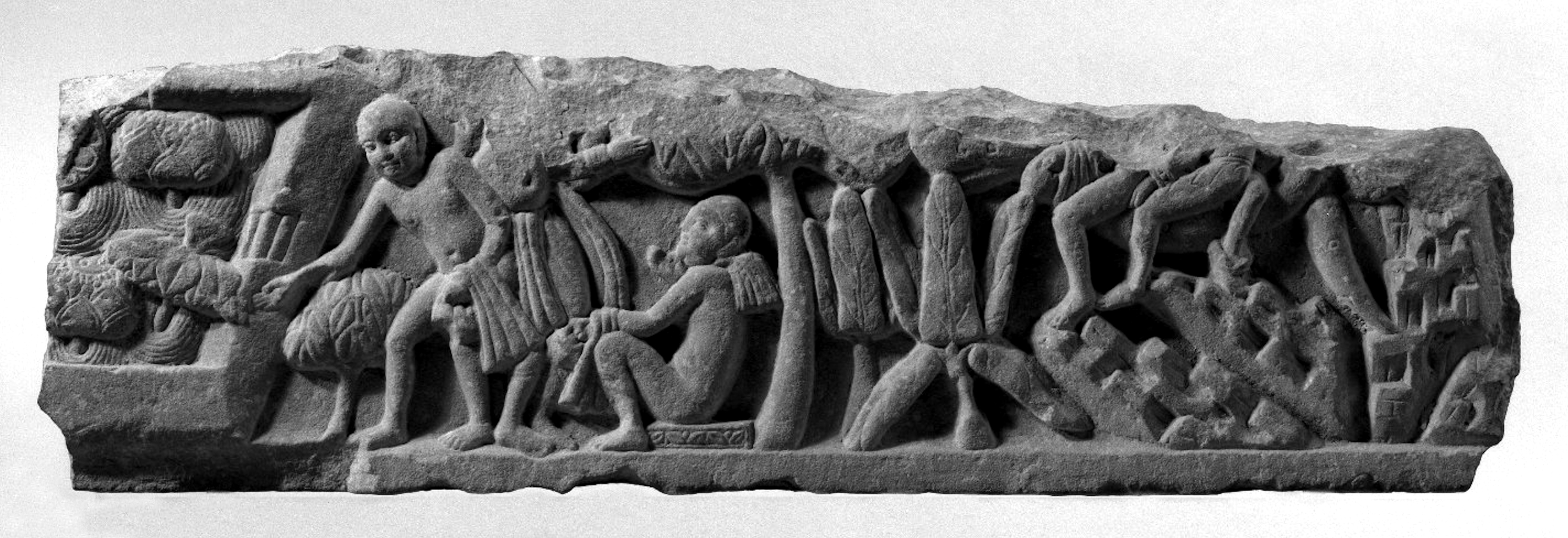
Jain relief showing monks of the ardhaphalaka sect. Early 1st century CE.

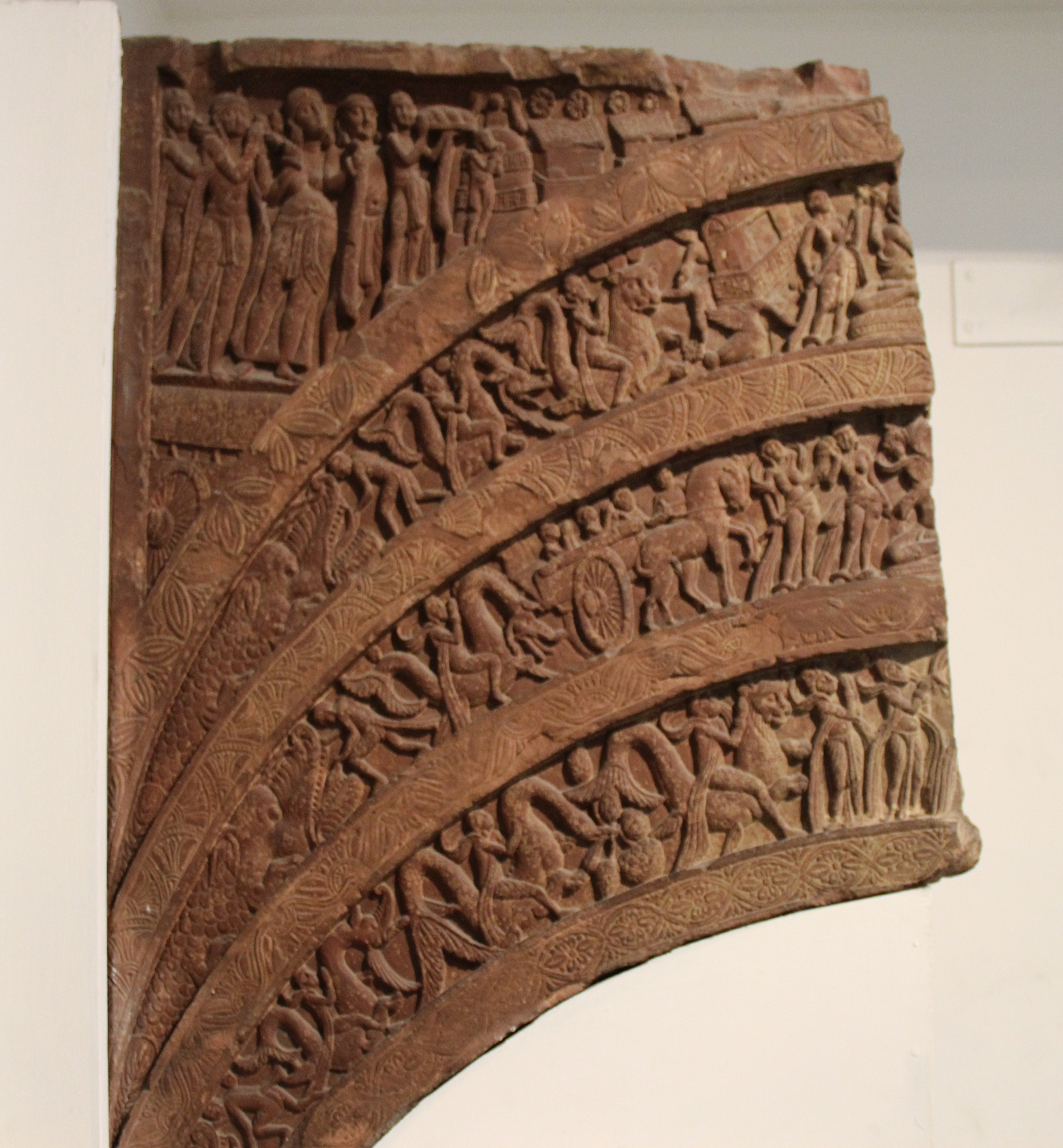
Jain decorated tympanum from Kankali Tila, Mathura, 15 CE.

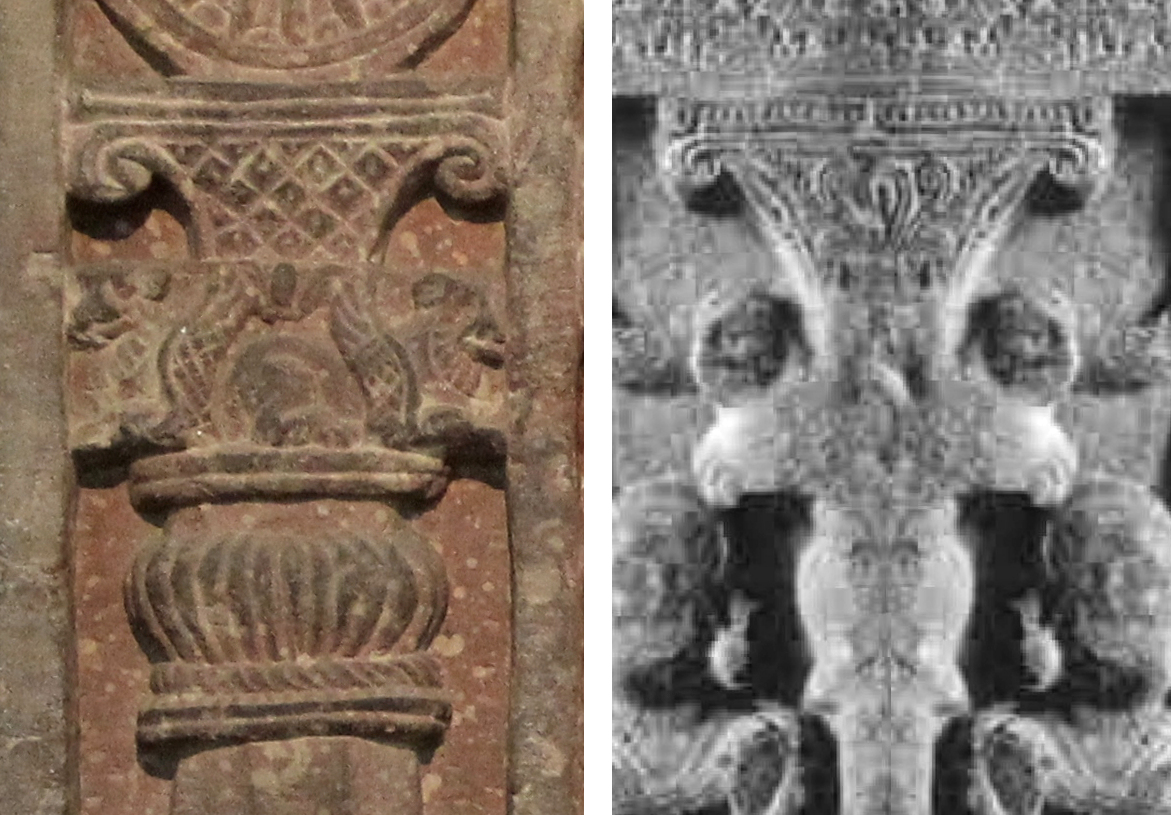
"Persian Achaemenian" style capitals appearing in ayagapatas, Mathura, 15-50 CE.

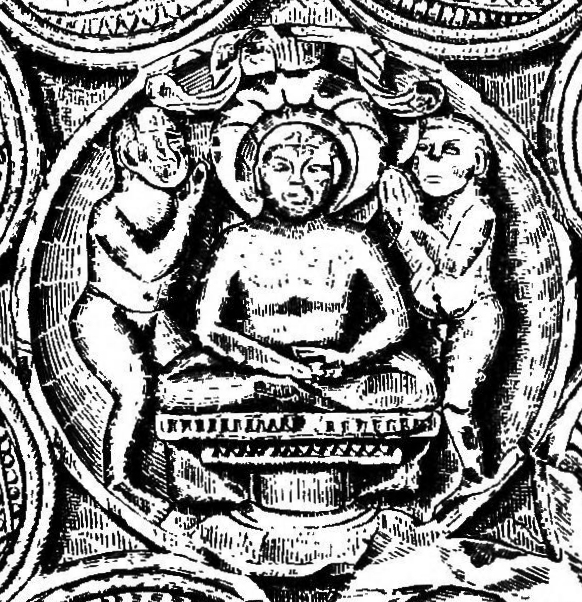
The Jina Parsvanatha (detail of an ayagapata), highly similar to the Isapur Buddha, Mathura circa 15 CE, Lucknow Museum.

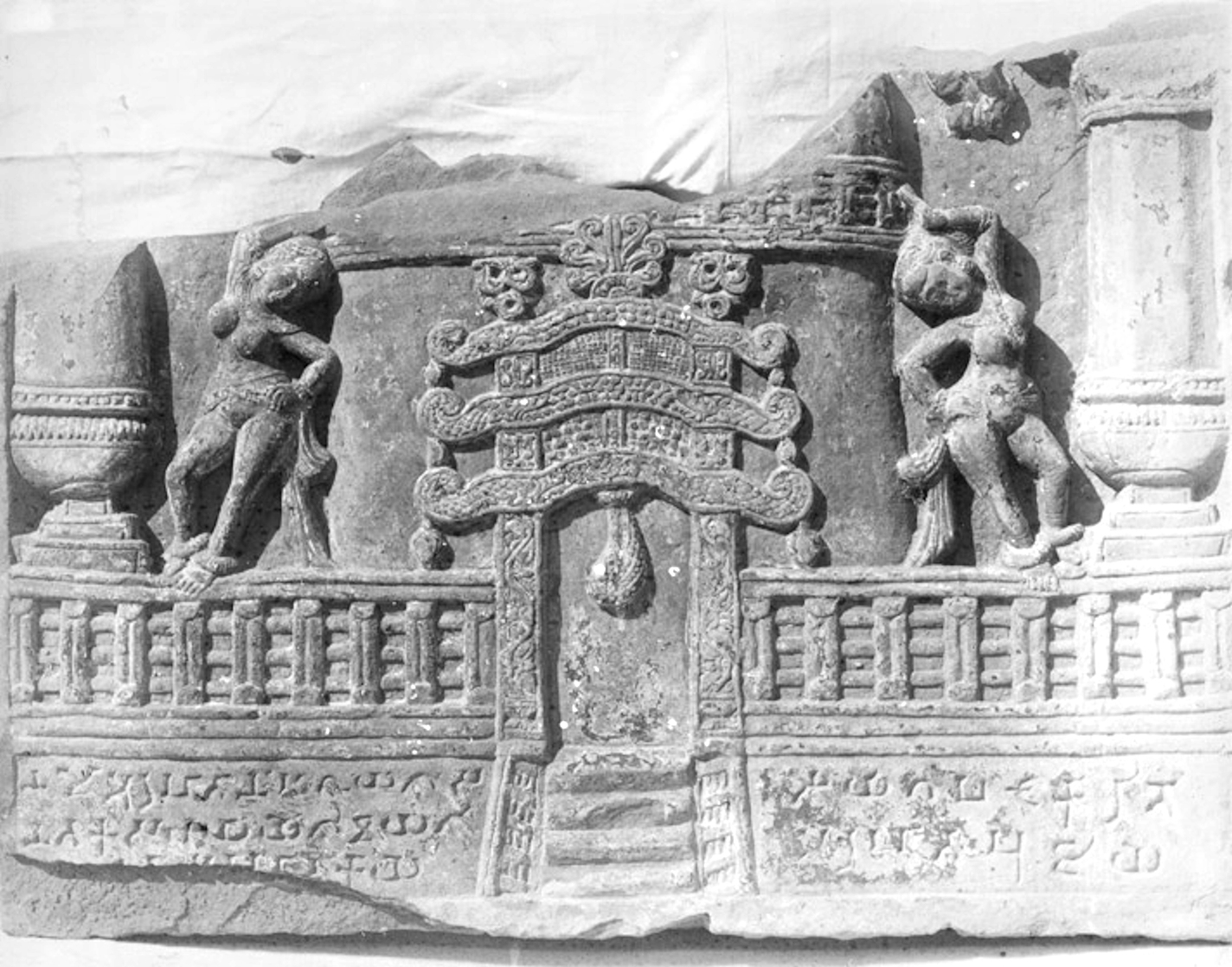
Sivayasa Ayagapata, with Jain stupa fragment, Kankali Tila, 75-100 CE.

==== Grapevine and garland designs (circa 15 CE) ====
A decorated doorjamb, the Vasu doorjamb, dedicated to deity Vāsudeva, also mentions the rule of Sodasa, and has similar carving to the Mora doorjamb, found in relation with the Mora well inscription in a similar chronological and religious context. The decoration of these and many similar doorjambs from Mathura consists in scrolls of grapevines. They are all dated to the reign of Sodasa, circa 15 CE and constitute a secure dated artistic reference for the evaluation of datation of other Mathura sculptures. It has been suggested that the grapevine design had been introduced from the Gandhara area in the northwest, and maybe associated with the northern taste of the Satrap rulers. These designs may also be the result of the work of northern artists in Mathura. The grapevine designs of Gandhara are generally considered as originating from Hellenistic art.

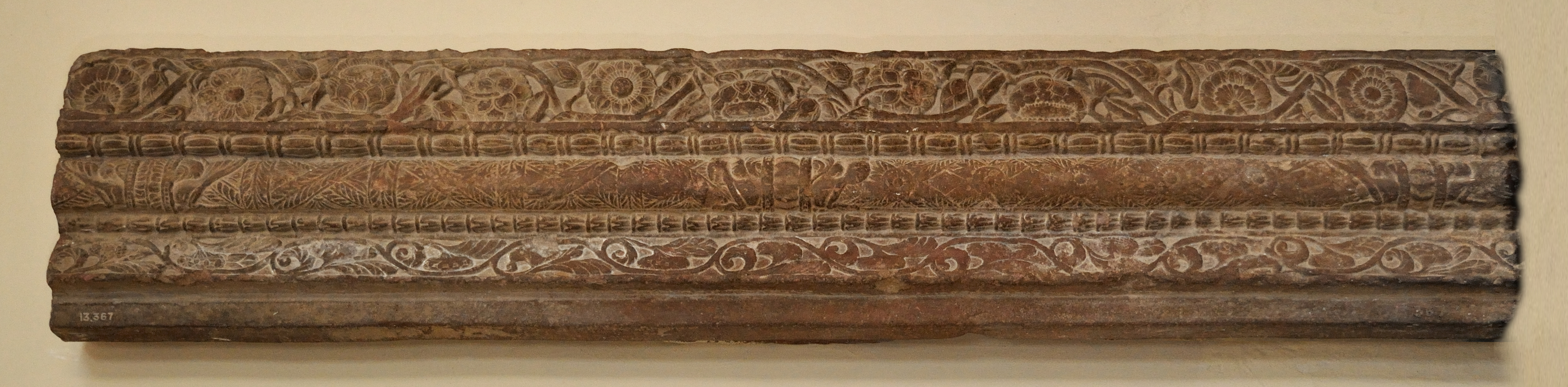
The Vasu doorjamb, dedicated to Vāsudeva "in the reign of Sodasa", Mathura, circa 15 CE. Mathura Museum, GMM 13.367

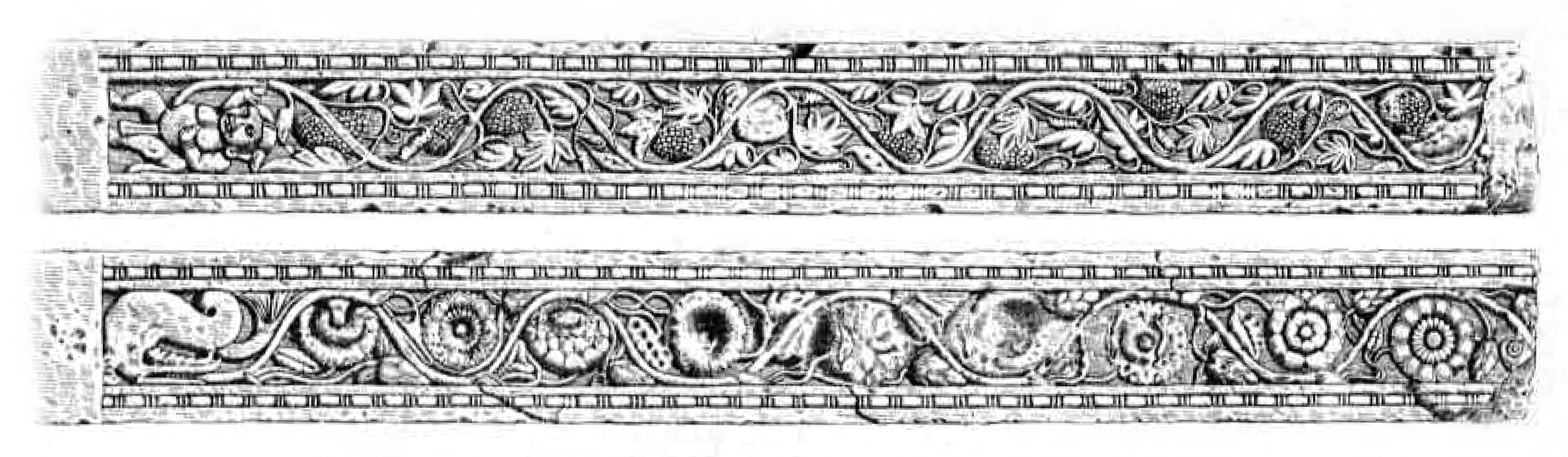
Reliefs of the Mora doorjamb with grapevine design, Mora, near Mathura, circa 15 CE. State Museum Lucknow, SML J.526. Similar scroll designs are known from Gandhara, from Pataliputra, and from Greco-Roman art.

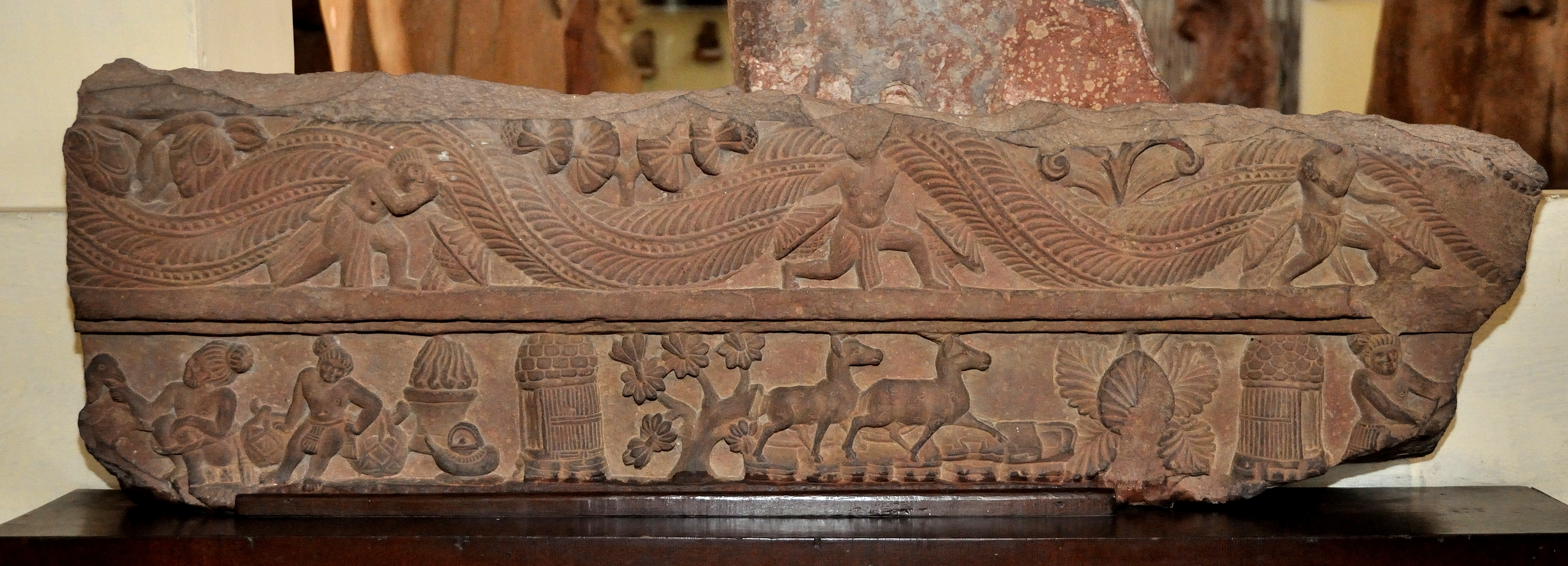
Garland bearers and Buddhist "Romaka" Jataka, in which the Buddha in a previous life was a pigeon. 25-50 CE. Similar garland-bearer designs are known from Gandhara, from Amaravati and from Greco-Roman art.

==== Calligraphy (end 1st century BCE - 1st century CE) ====
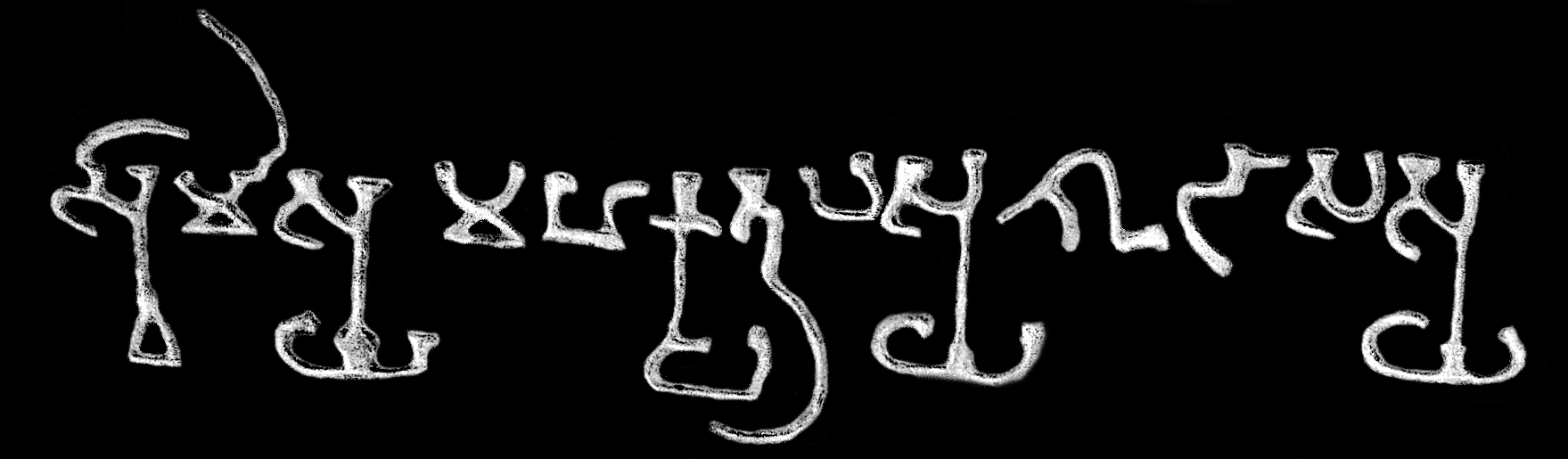
A sample of the new calligraphic style introduced by the Indo-Scythians: fragment of the Mirzapur stele inscription, in the vicinity of Mathura, circa 15 CE. Svāmisya Mahakṣatrapasya Śudasasya "Of the Lord and Great Satrap Śudāsa"

The calligraphy of the Brahmi script had remained virtually unchanged from the time of the Maurya Empire to the end of the 1st century BCE. The Indo-Scythians, following their establishment in northern India introduced "revolutionary changes" in the way Brahmi was written. In the 1st century BCE, the shape of Brahmi characters became more angular, and the vertical segments of letters were equalized, a phenomenon which is clearly visible in coin legends and made the script visually more similarly to Greek. In this new typeface, the letter were "neat and well-formed". The probable introduction of ink and pen writing, with the characteristic thickenned start of each stroke generated by the usage of ink, was reproduced in the calligraphy of stone inscriptions by the creation of a triangle-shaped form at the beginning of each stroke. This new writing style is particularly visible in the numerous dedicatory inscriptions made in Mathura, in association with devotional works of art. This new calligraphy of the Brahmi script was adopted in the rest of the subcontinent of the next half century. The "new-pen-style" initiated a rapid evolution of the script from the 1st century CE, with regional variations starting to emerge.

==== First images of the Buddha (from circa 15 CE) ====
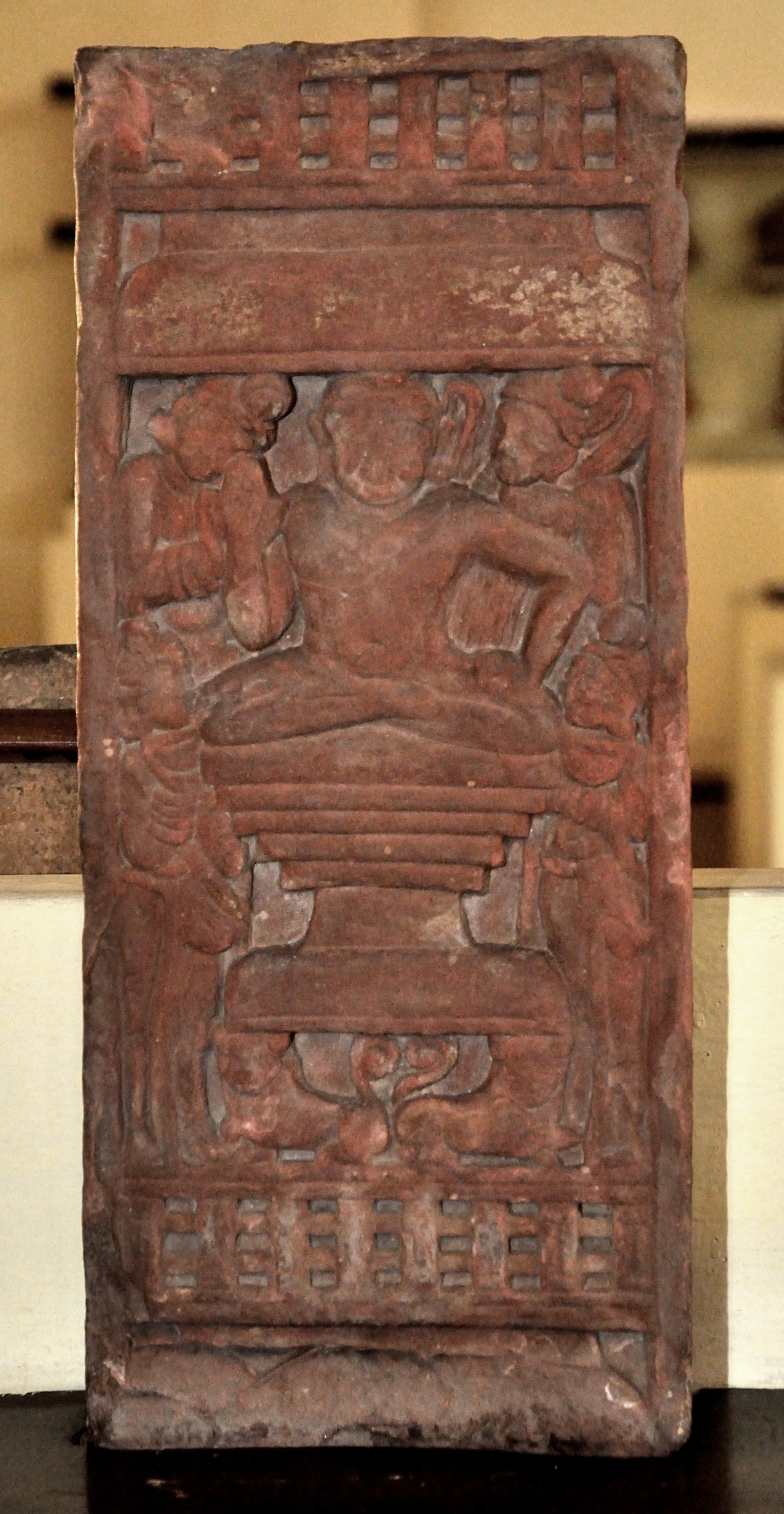
The "Isapur Buddha", probably the earliest known representation of the Buddha (possibly together with the Butkara seated Buddha statue at the Butkara Stupa, Swat), on a railing post, dated to circa 15 CE.

From around the 2nd-1st century BCE at Bharhut and Sanchi, scenes of the life of the Buddha, or sometimes of his previous lives, had been illustrated without showing the Buddha himself, except for some of his symbols such as the empty throne, or the Chankrama pathway. This artistic device ended with the sudden appearance of the Buddha, probably rather simultaneously in Gandhara and Mathura, at the turn of the millennium.

Possibly the first known representation of the Buddha (the Bimaran casket and the Tillya Tepe Buddhist coin are other candidates), the "Isapur Buddha" is also dated on stylistic grounds to the reign of Sodasa, circa 15 CE; he is shown on a relief in a canonical scene known as "Lokapalas offer Alms Bowls to the Buddha Sakyamuni". The symbolism of this early statue is still tentative, drawing heavily on the earlier, especially Jain, pictural traditions of Mathura, still far from the exuberant standardized designs of the Kushan Empire. It is rather unassuming and not yet monumental compared to the Buddha sculptures of the following century, and may represent one of the first attempts to create a human icon, marking an evolution from the splendid aniconic tradition of Buddhist art in respect to the person of the Buddha, which can be seen in the art of Sanchi and Bharhut. This depiction of the Buddha is highly similar to Jain images of the period, such as the relief of Jina Parsvanatha on an ayagapata, also dated to circa 15 CE.

It is thought that the images of Jain saints, which can be seen in Mathura from the 1st century BCE, were prototypes for the first Mathura images of the Buddha, since the attitudes are very similar, and the almost transparent very thin garment of the Buddha not much different visually from the nakedness of the Jinas. Here the Buddha is not wearing the monastic robe which would become characteristic of many of the later Buddha images. The cross-legged sitting posture may have derived from earlier reliefs of cross-legged ascetics or teachers at Bharhut, Sanchi and Bodh Gaya. It has also been suggested that the cross-legged Buddhas may have derived from the depictions of seated Scythian kings from the northwest, as visible in the coinage of Maues (90-80 BCE) or Azes (57-10 BC).

There has been a recurring debate about the exact identity of these Mathura statues, some claiming that they are only statues of Bodhisattavas, which is indeed the exact term used in most of the inscriptions of the statues found in Mathura. Only one or two statues of the Mathura type are known to mention the Buddha himself. This could be in conformity with an ancient Buddhist prohibition against showing the Buddha himself in human form, otherwise known as aniconism in Buddhism, expressed in the Sarvastivada vinaya (rules of the early Buddhist school of the Sarvastivada): ""Since it is not permitted to make an image of the Buddha's body, I pray that the Buddha will grant that I can make an image of the attendant Bodhisattva. Is that acceptable?" The Buddha answered: "You may make an image of the Bodhisattava"". However the scenes in the Isapur Buddha and the later Indrasala Buddha (dated 50-100 CE), refer to events which are considered to have happened after the Buddha's enlightenment, and therefore probably represent the Buddha rather than his younger self as a Bodhisattava, or a simple attendant Bodhisattva.

===== Other reliefs =====
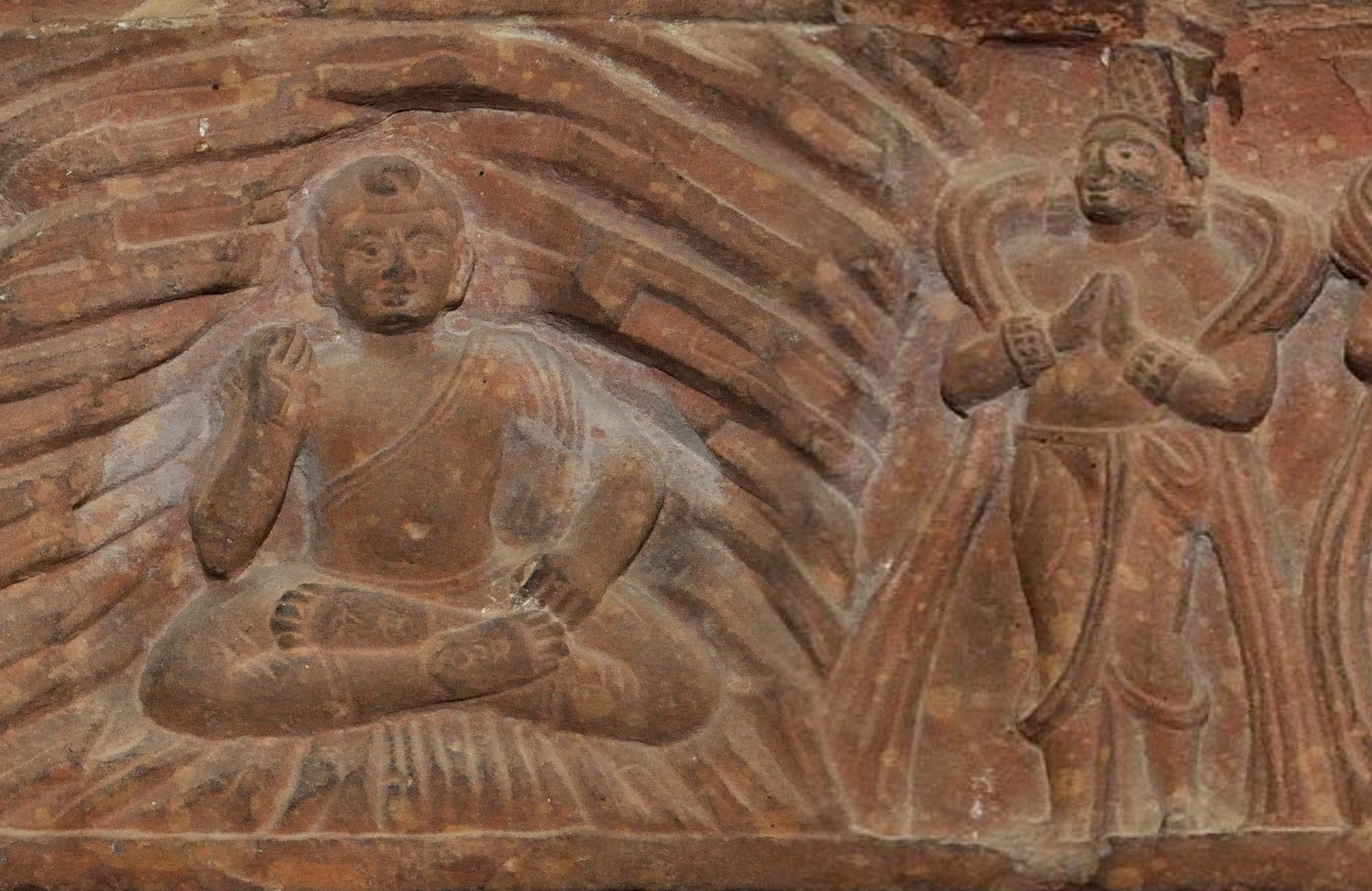
"Indrasala architrave", detail of the Buddha in Indrasala Cave, attended by the Vedic deity Indra. 50-100 CE.

The Buddhist "Indrasala architrave", dated 50-100 CE, with a scene of the Buddha at the Indrasala Cave being attended by Indra, and a scene of devotion to the Bodhi Tree on the other side, is another example of the still hesitant handling of the human icon of the Buddha in the Buddhist art of Mathura. The Buddhist character of this architrave is clearly demonstrated by the depiction of the Bodhi Tree inside its specially built temple at Bodh Gaya, a regular scene of Buddhist since the reliefs of Bharhut and Sanchi. The depiction of the Buddha in meditation in the Indrasala Cave is also characteristically Buddhist. The Buddha already has the attributes, if not the style, of the later "Kapardin" statues, except for the absence of a halo.

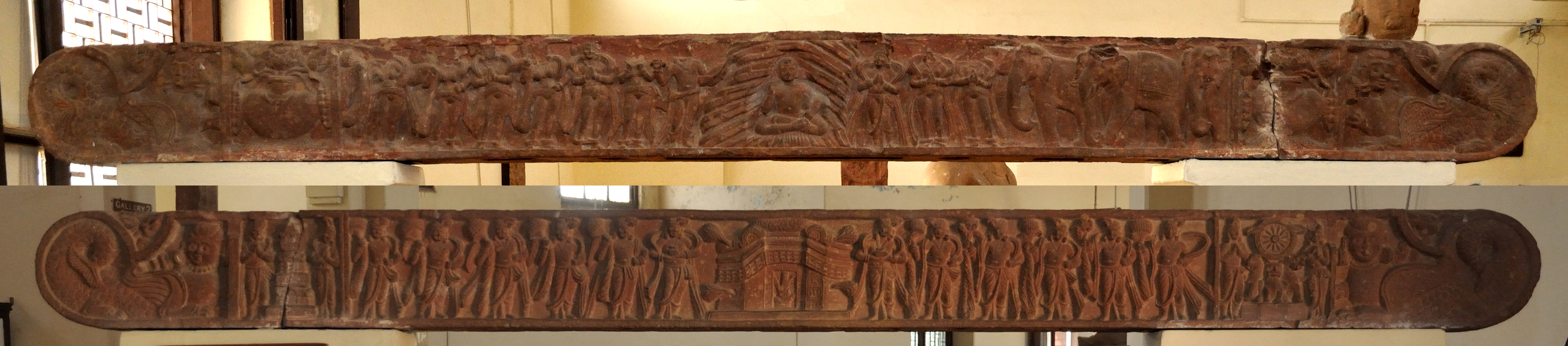
Buddhist "Indrasala architrave", with Buddha and Bodhi Tree in the center of each side, dated 50-100 CE, before the Kushan period. The Buddha is attended by Vedic deity Indra on the side of the Indrasala Cave.

===== Vedic deities =====
Besides the hero cult of the Vrishni heroes or the cross-sectarian cult of the Yakshas, Hindu art only started to develop fully from the 1st to the 2nd century CE, and there are only very few examples of artistic representation before that time. The three Vedic gods Indra, Brahma and Surya were actually first depicted in Buddhist sculpture, as attendants in scenes commemorating the life of the Buddha, even when the Buddha himself was not yet shown in human form but only through his symbols, such as the scenes of his Birth, his Descent from the Trāyastriṃśa Heaven, or his retreat in the Indrasala Cave. These Vedic deities appear in Buddhist reliefs at Mathura from around the 1st century CE, such as Indra attending the Buddha at Indrasala Cave, where Indra is shown with a mitre-like crown, and joining hands.

===== Early "Kapardin" statuary (end of 1st century CE) =====
Early "Kapardin" statuary

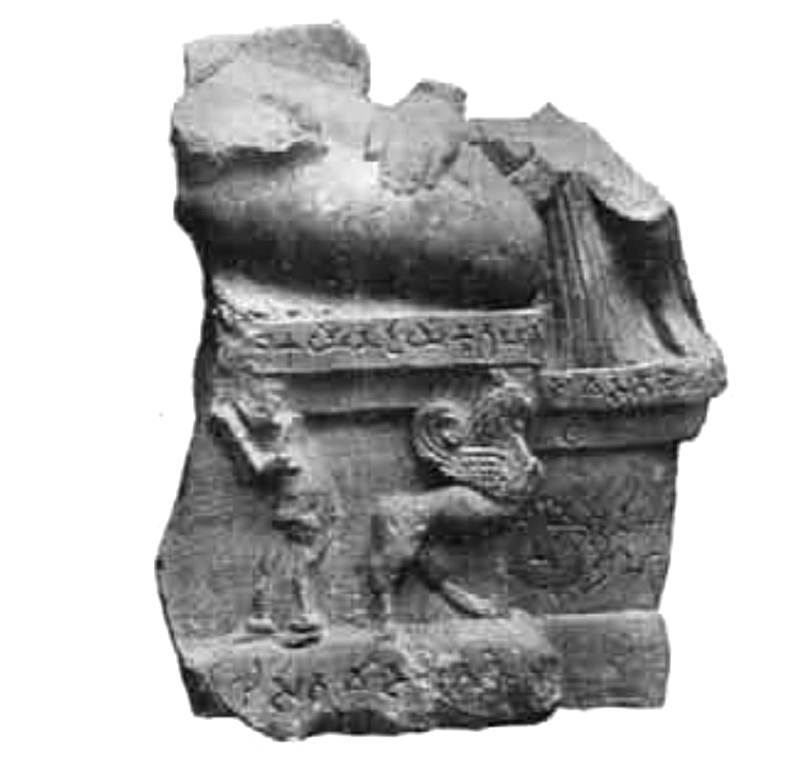
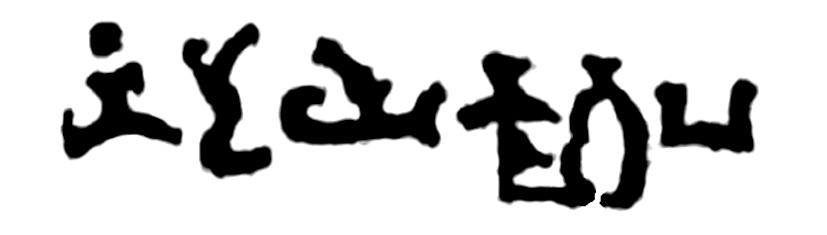
Katra fragment of a Buddha stele in the name of a "Kshatrapa lady" named Naṃda ( Naṃdaye Kshatrapa).

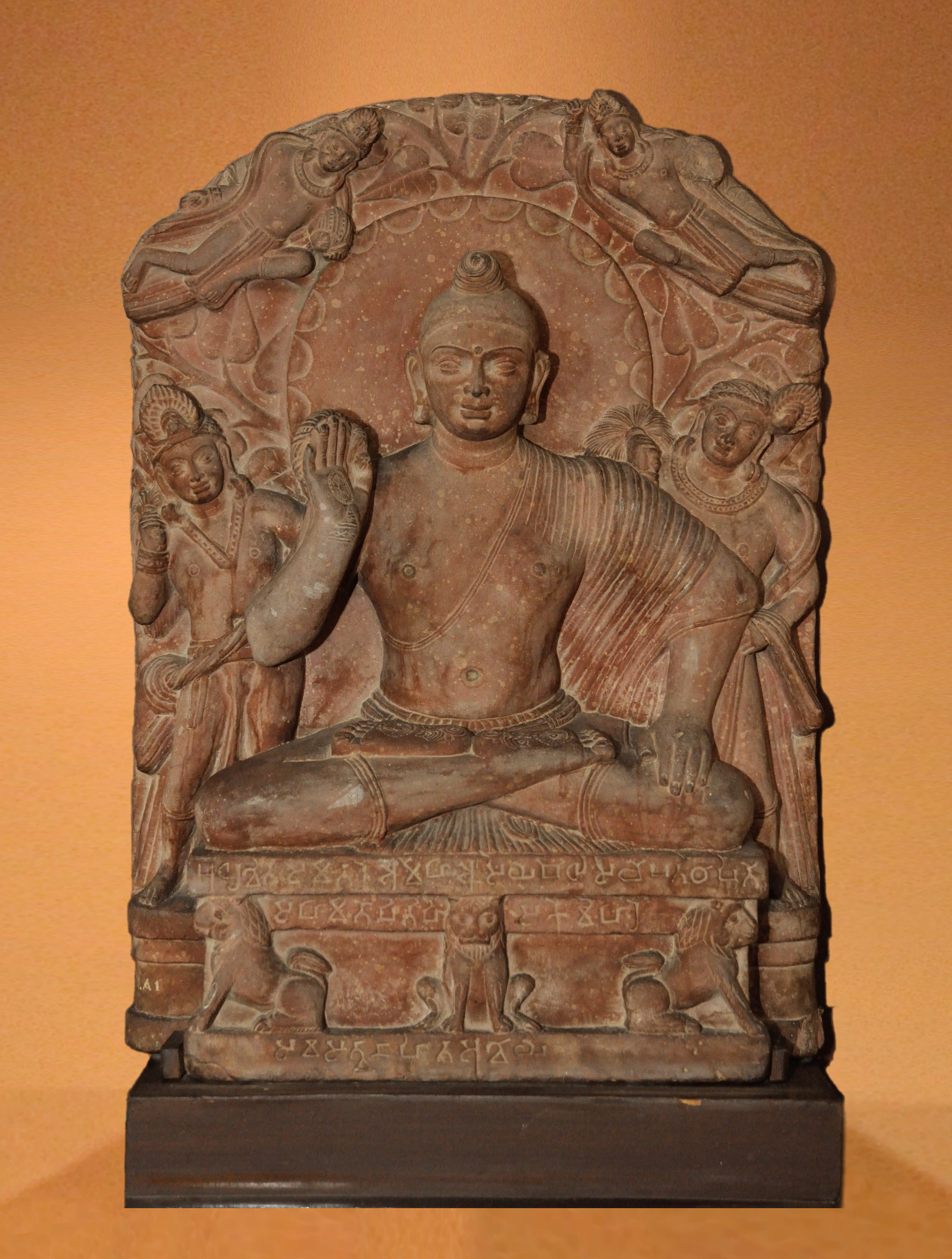
"Katra Bodhisattava stele" with inscription, dated to the Northern Satraps period.

The earliest types of "Kapardin" statuary (named after the "kapardin", the characteristic tuft of coiled hair of the Buddha) showing the Buddha with attendants are thought to be pre-Kushan, dating to the time of the "Kshatrapas" or Northern Satraps. Various broken bases of Buddha statues with inscriptions have been attributed to the Kshatrapas. A fragment of such a stele was found with the mention of the name of the donor as a "Kshatrapa lady" named Naṃda who dedicated the Bodhisattva image "for the welfare and happiness of all sentient beings for the acceptance of the Sarvastivadas", and it is considered as contemporary with the famous "Katra stele".

One of these early examples shows the Buddha being worshipped by the Gods Brahma and Indra.

The famous "Katra Bodhisattava stele" is the only fully intact image of a "Kapardin" Bodhisattva remaining from the Kshatrapa period, and is considered as the foundation type of the "Kapardin" Buddha imagery, and is the "classical statement of the type".

In conclusion, the canonical type of the seated Bodhisattva with attendants commonly known as the "Kapardin" type, seems to have developed during the time the Indo-Scythian Northern Satraps were still ruling in Mathura, before the arrival of the Kushans. This type continued during the Kushan period, down to the time of Huvishka, before being overtaken by fully-dressed types of Buddha statuary depicting the Buddha wearing the monastic coat "Samghati".

=== Coinage of the Northern Satraps ===
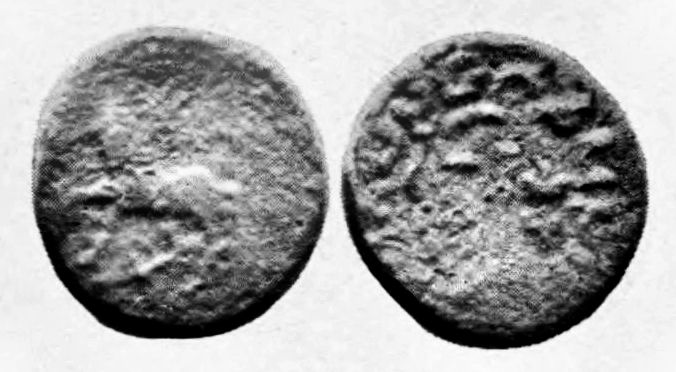
Coin of satrap Hagamasha. Obv. Horse to the left. Rev. Standing figure with symbols, legend Khatapasa Hagāmashasa. 1st century BCE.

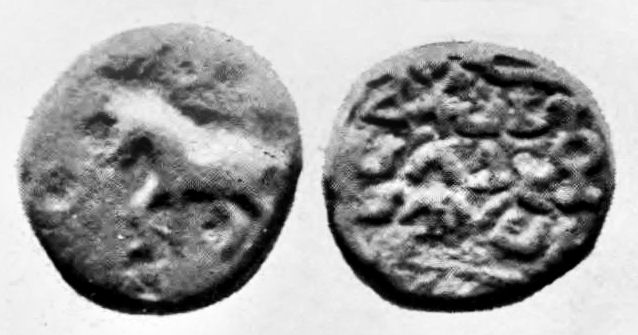
Joint coin of Hagana and Hagamasha. Obv.: Horse to left. Rev. Thunderbolt, legend Khatapāna Hagānasa Hagāmashasa. 1st century BCE.

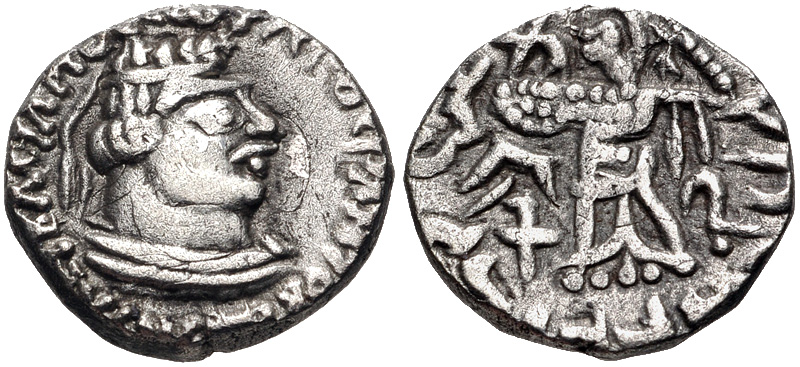
Coin of Rajuvula, c. 10 CE

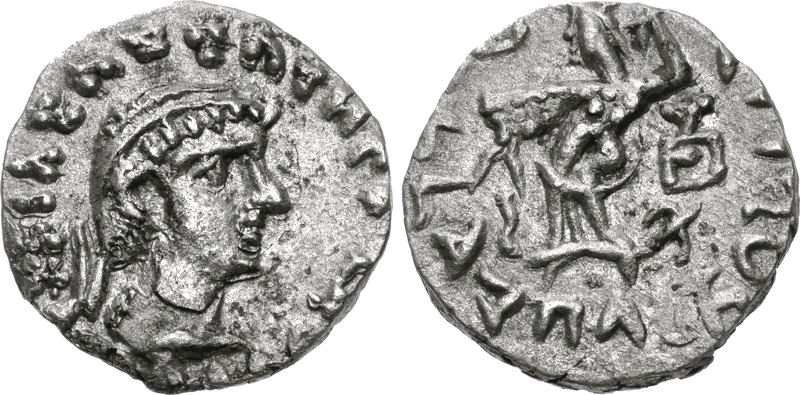
Coin of Bhadrayasha, early 1st century CE

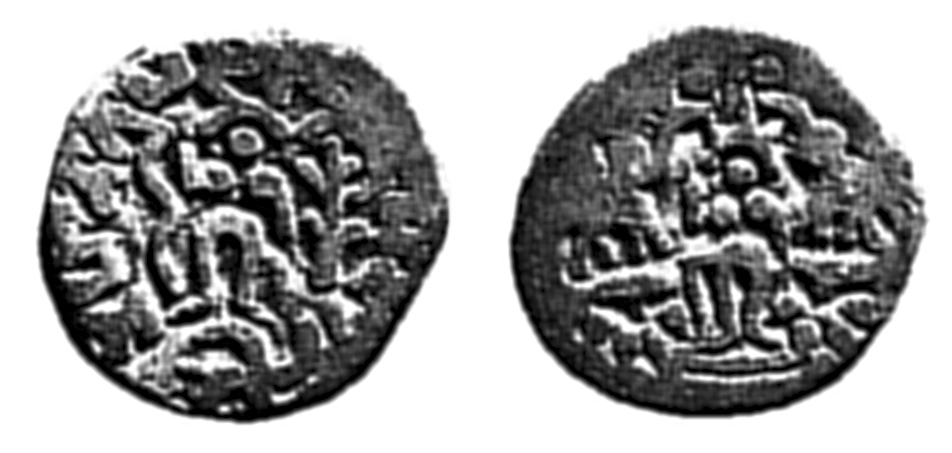
Coin of Sodasa, early 1st century CE

== Art of Western India under the Western Satraps (circa 2nd-4th centuries CE) ==
=== Construction of Buddhist caves ===
The Western Satraps are known for the construction and dedication of numerous Buddhist caves in Central India, particularly in the areas of Maharashtra and Gujarat. It is thought that Nahapana ruled at least 35 years in the region of Karla, Junnar and Nasik, giving him ample time for construction works there.

Numerous inscriptions in the caves are known, which were made by the family of Nahapana: six inscriptions in Nasik Caves, one inscription at Karla Caves, and one by Nahapana's minister in the Manmodi Caves at Junnar. At the same time, "Yavanas", Greeks or Indo-Greeks, also left donative inscriptions at the Nasik Caves, Karla Caves, Lenyadri and Manmodi Caves.

==== Great Chaitya hall at Karla Caves ====
In particular, the chaitya cave complex of the Karla Caves, the largest in South Asia, was dedicated in 120 CE by the Western Satraps ruler Nahapana.

Great Chaitya hall at Karla

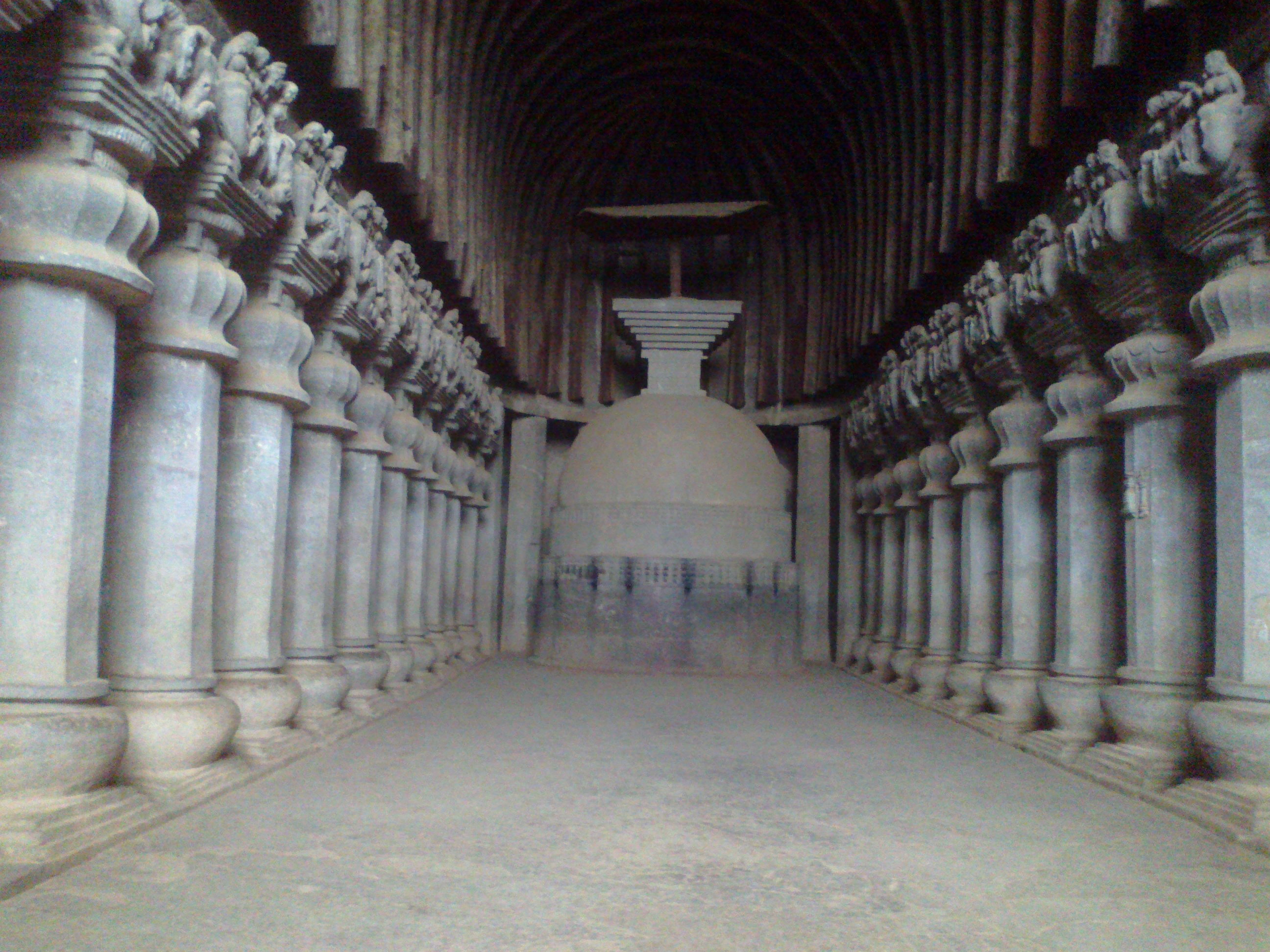
Hall of the Great Chaitya Cave at Karla (120 CE)

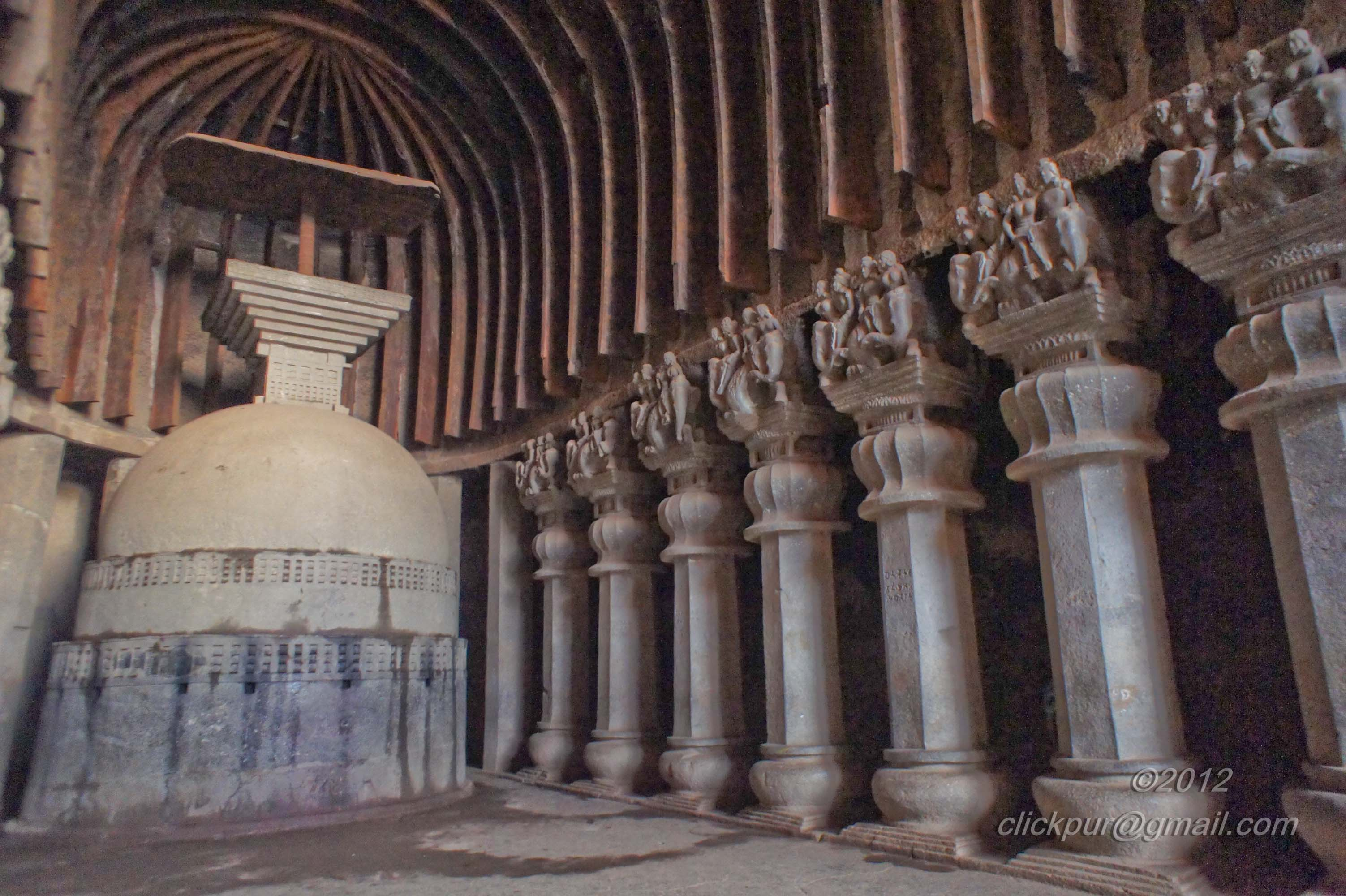
Right row of columns

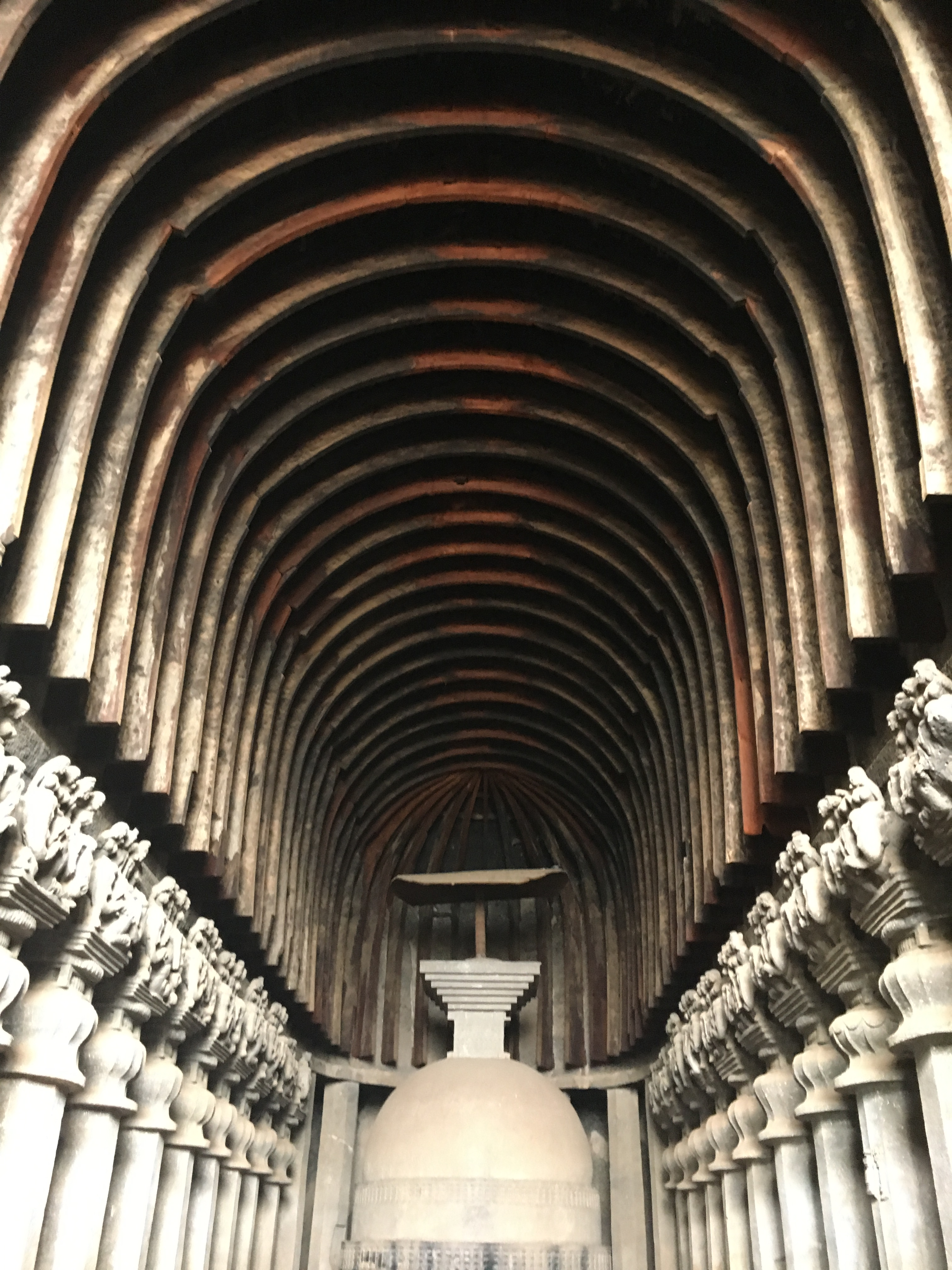
Chaitya roof

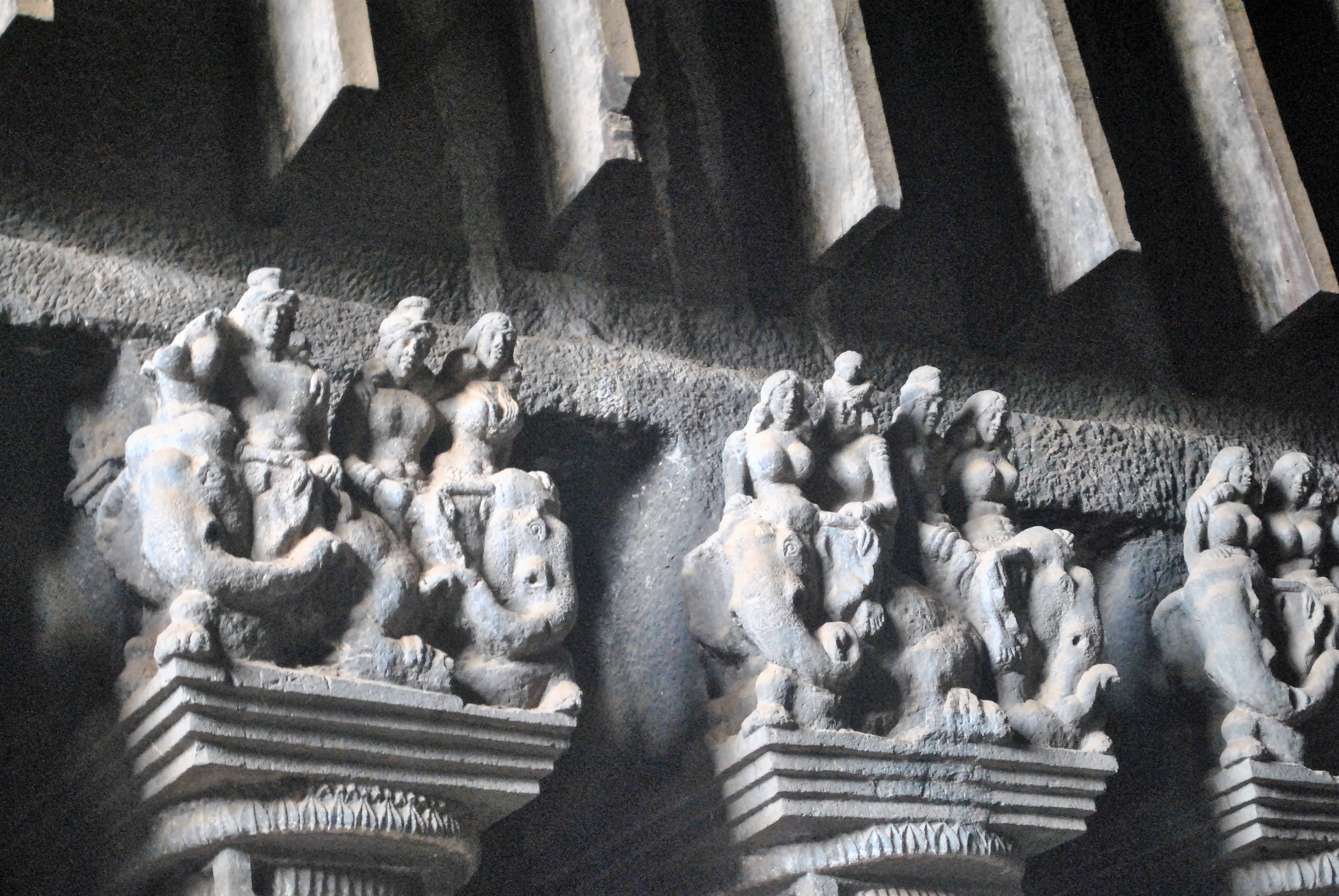
Capitals

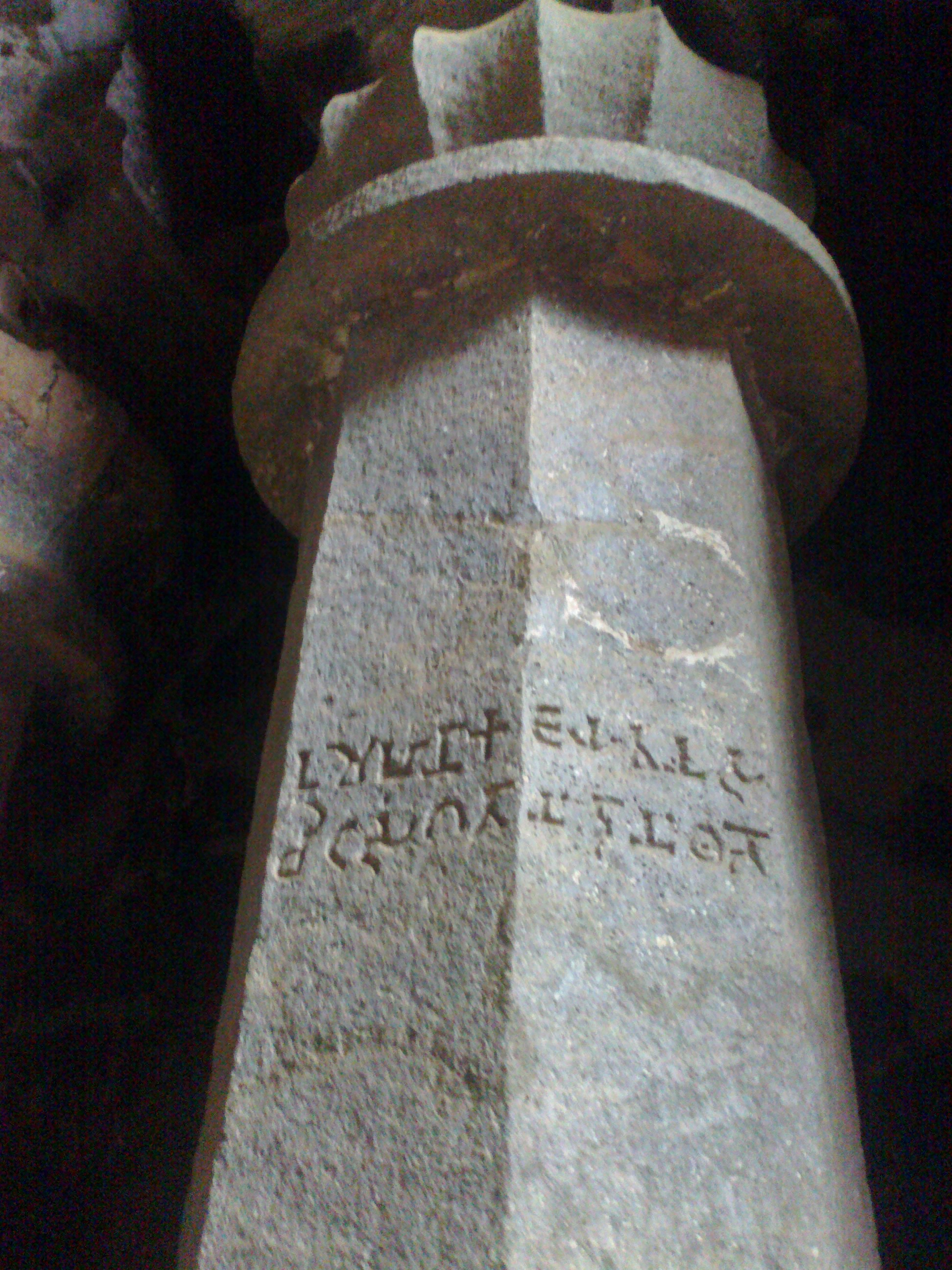
Donative inscription by a Yavana ("Indo-Greek") named Vitasamghata.

==== Cave No.10 of Nasik, the 'Nahapana Vihara' ====
Parts of the Nasik Caves, also called Pandavleni Caves, were also carved during the time of Nahapana.

The inscriptions of cave no.10 in the Nasik Caves near Nasik, reveal that in 105-106 CE, Kshatrapas defeated the Satavahanas after which Kshatrapa Nahapana’s son-in-law and Dinika's son- Ushavadata donated 3000 gold coins for this cave as well as for the food and clothing of the monks. Usabhdatta's wife (Nahapana's daughter), Dakshmitra also donated one cave for the Buddhist monks. Cave 10 - 'Nahapana Vihara' is spacious with 16 rooms.

Nasik Caves, cave No. 10

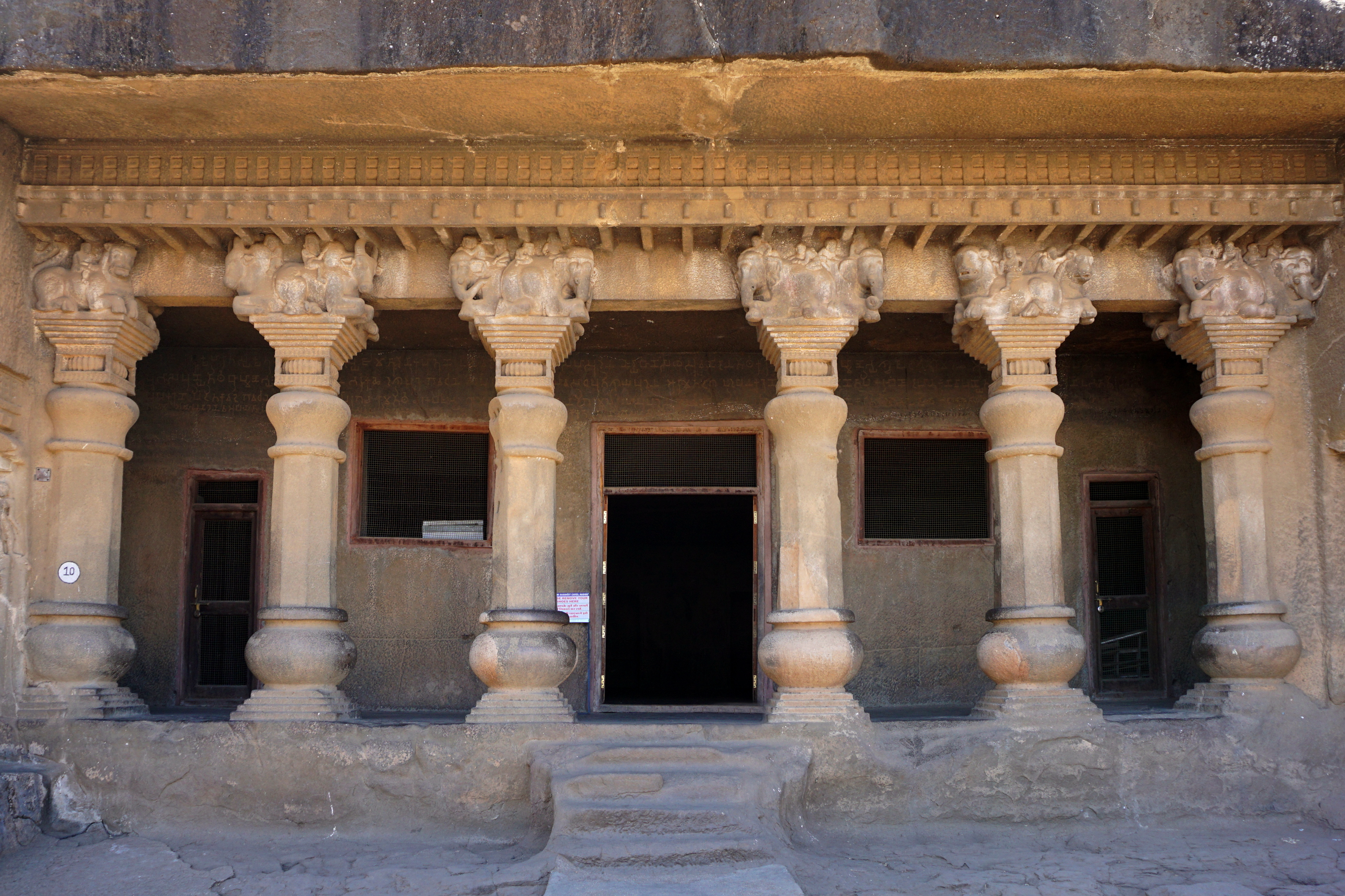
Front

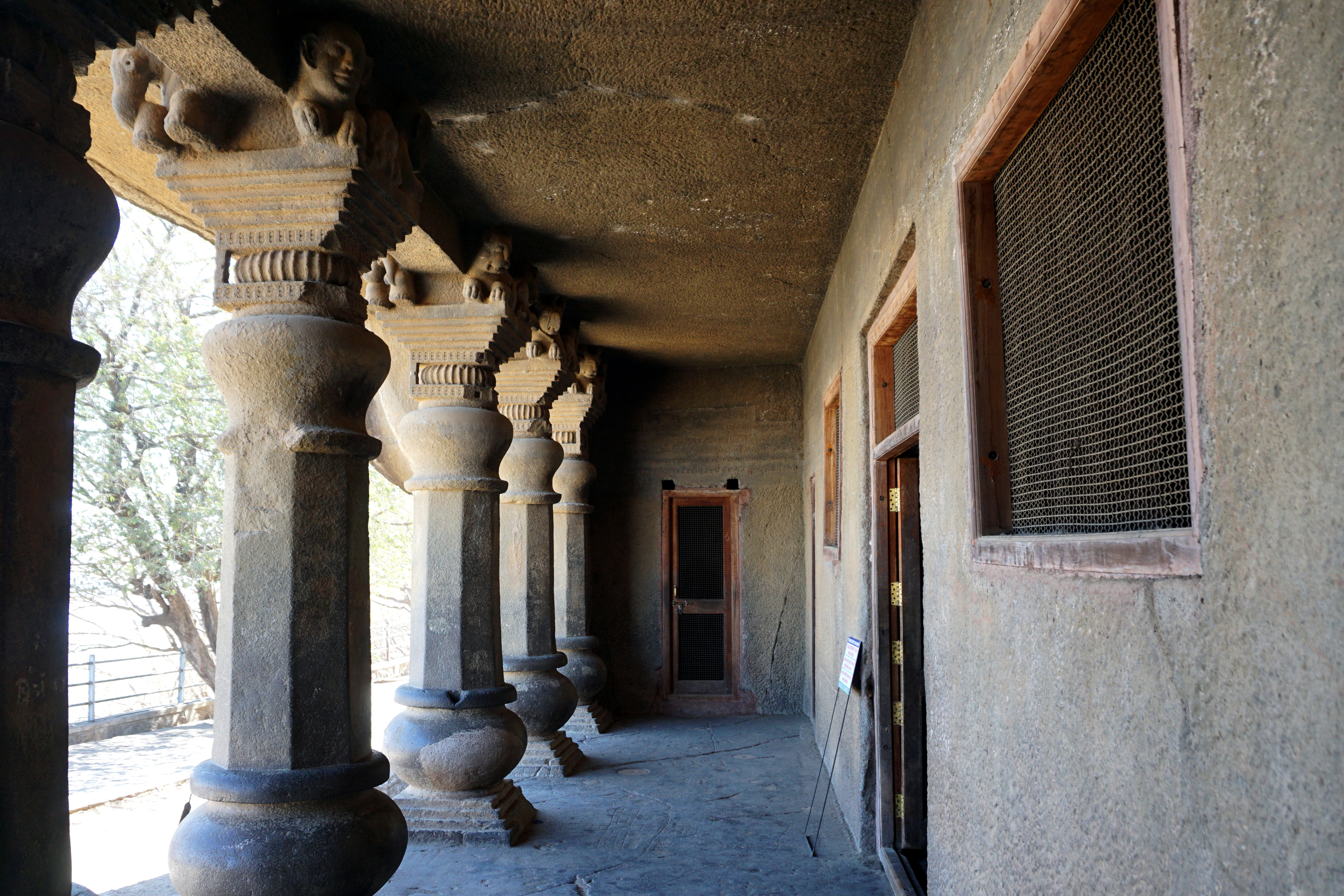
Veranda

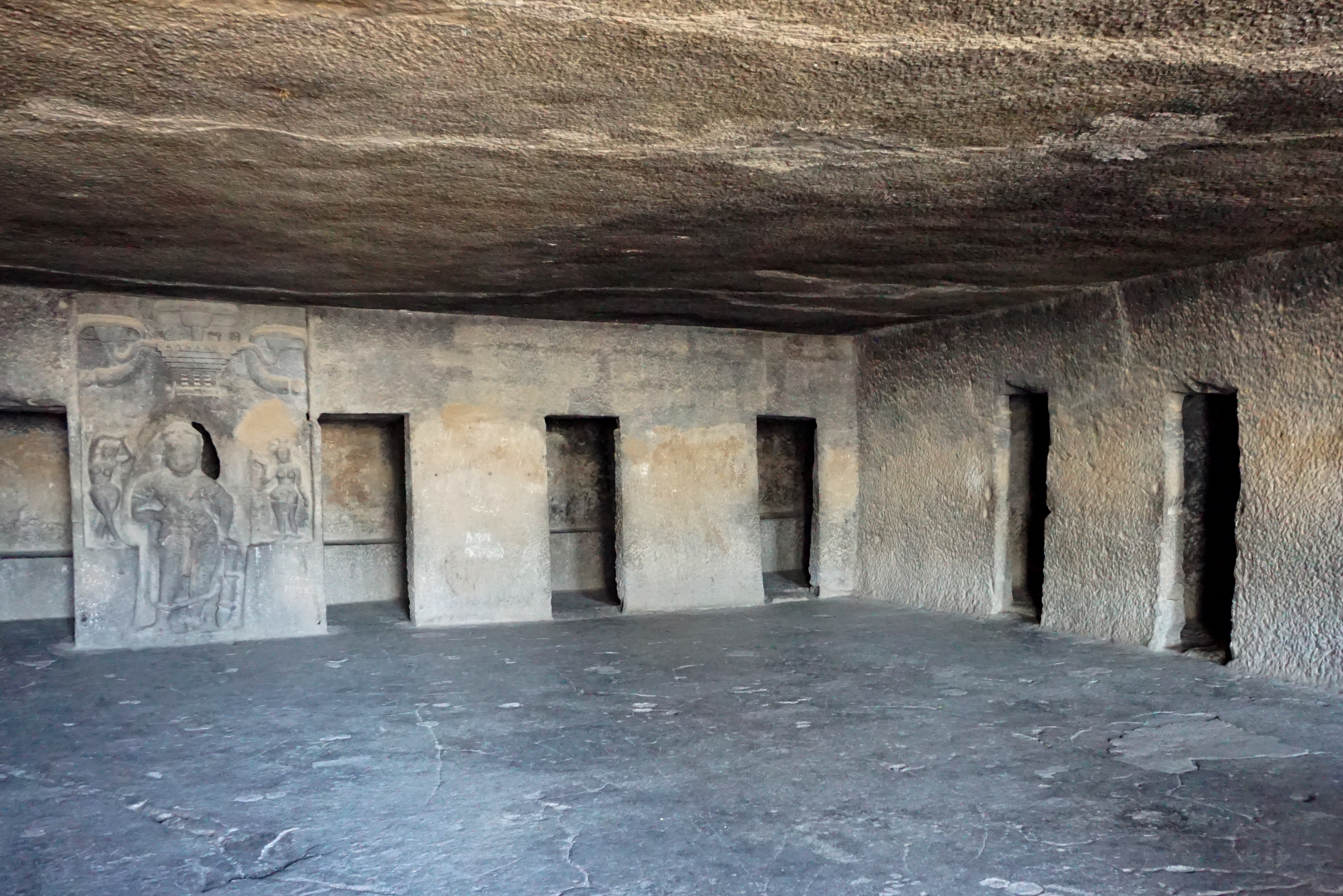
Interior

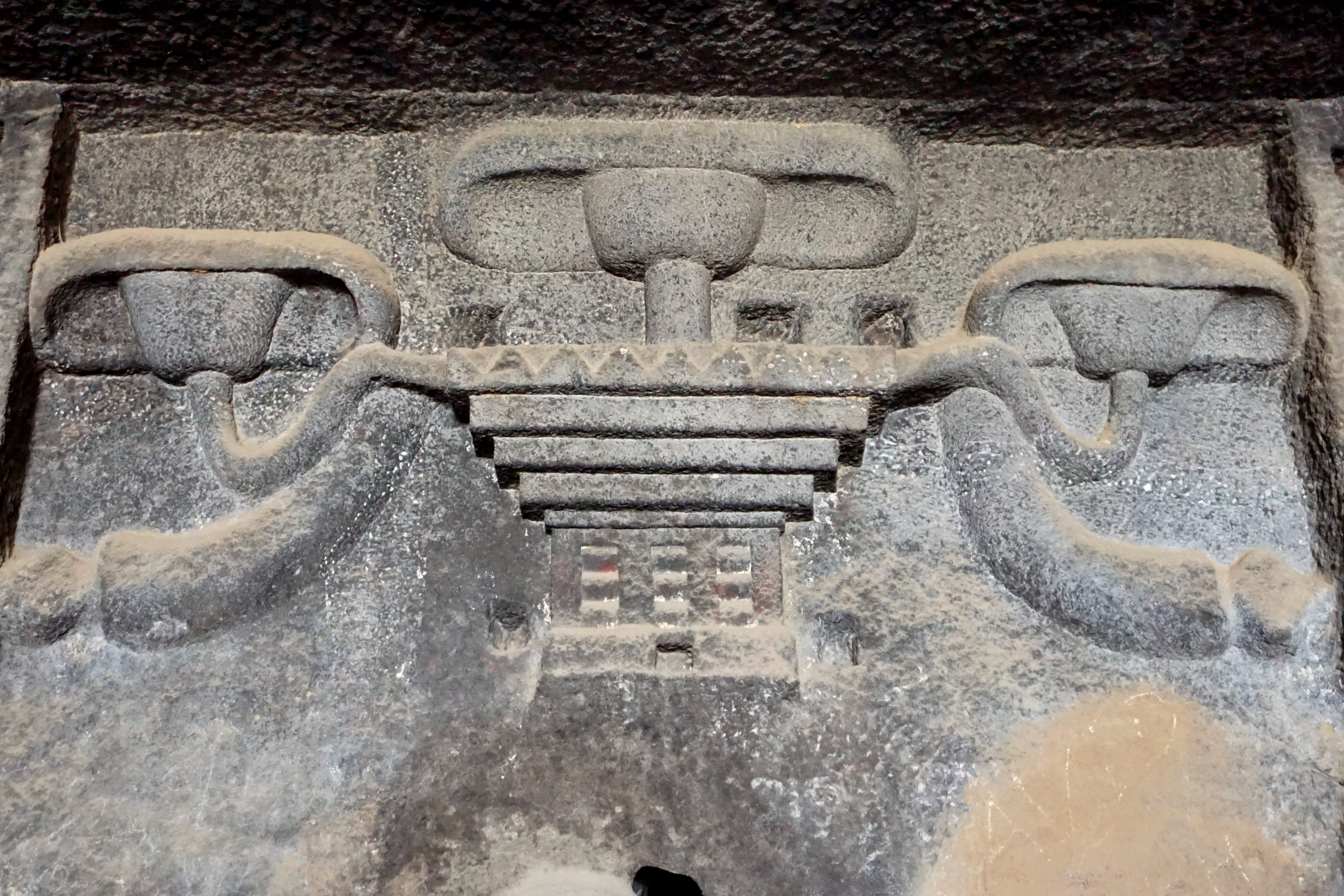
Chaitya and Umbrellas

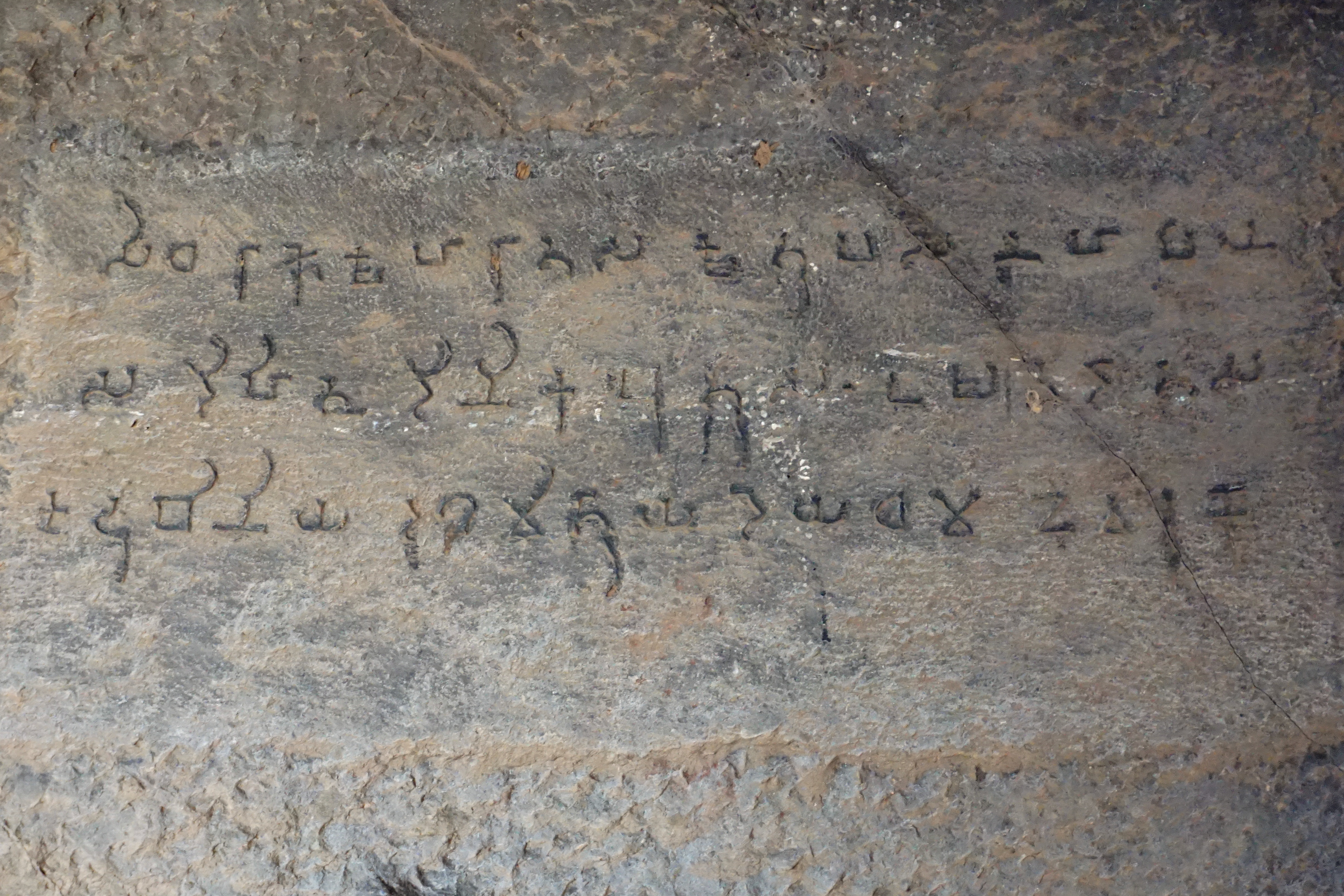
Inscription

Two inscriptions in Cave 10 mention the building and the gift of the whole cave to the Samgha by Ushavadata, the Saka son-in-law and viceroy of Nahapana:

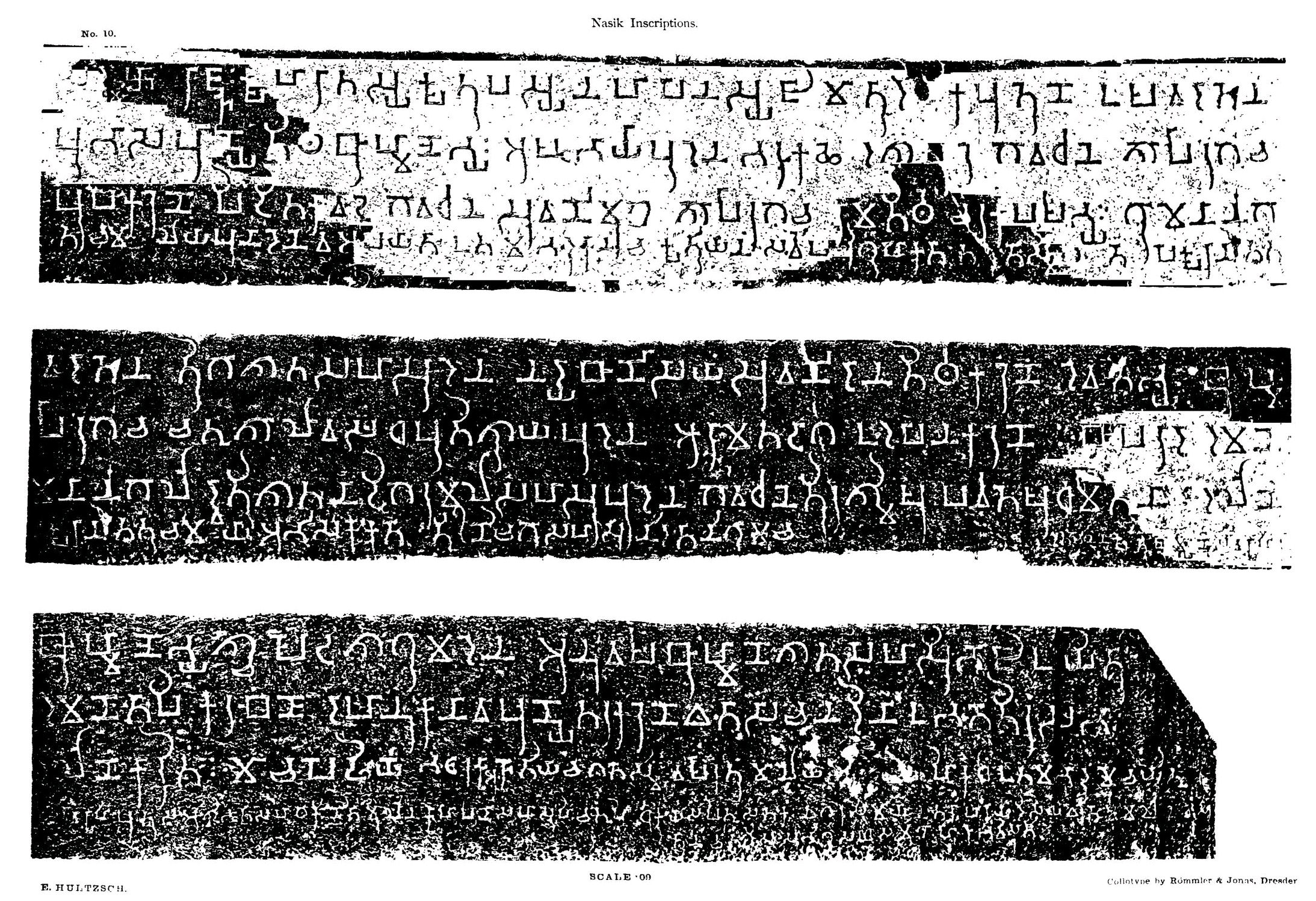
Nasik Cave inscription No.10. of Nahapana, Cave No.10.

Success! Ushavadata, son of Dinika, son-in-law of king Nahapana, the Kshaharata Kshatrapa, (...) inspired by (true) religion, in the Trirasmi hills at Govardhana, has caused this cave to be made and these cisterns.

— Inscription No.10 of Nahapana, Cave No.10, Nasik

Success! In the year 42, in the month Vesakha, Ushavadata, son of Dinika, son-in-law of king Nahapana, the Kshaharata Kshatrapa, has bestowed this cave on the Samgha generally....

— Inscription No.12 of Nahapana, Cave No.10, Nasik

According to the inscriptions, Ushavadata accomplished various charities and conquests on behalf of his father-in-law. He constructed rest-houses, gardens and tanks at Bharukachchha (Broach), Dashapura (Mandasor in Malva), Govardhana (near Nasik) and Shorparaga (Sopara in the Thana district).

==== Junnar dedication ====
A dedication in the Lenyadri complex of the Junnar caves (inscription No. 26 in Cave VI of the Bhimasankar group of caves), mentions a gift by Nahapana's prime minister Ayama in the "year 46":

The meritorious gift.... of Ayama of the Vachhasagotra, prime minister of the King Mahakshatrapa the lord Nahapana

— Junnar inscription No. 26, 124 CE

This inscription, the last one of the reign of Nahapana, suggests that Nahapana may have become an independent ruler since he is described as a King.

=== Other contributions to Buddhism ===
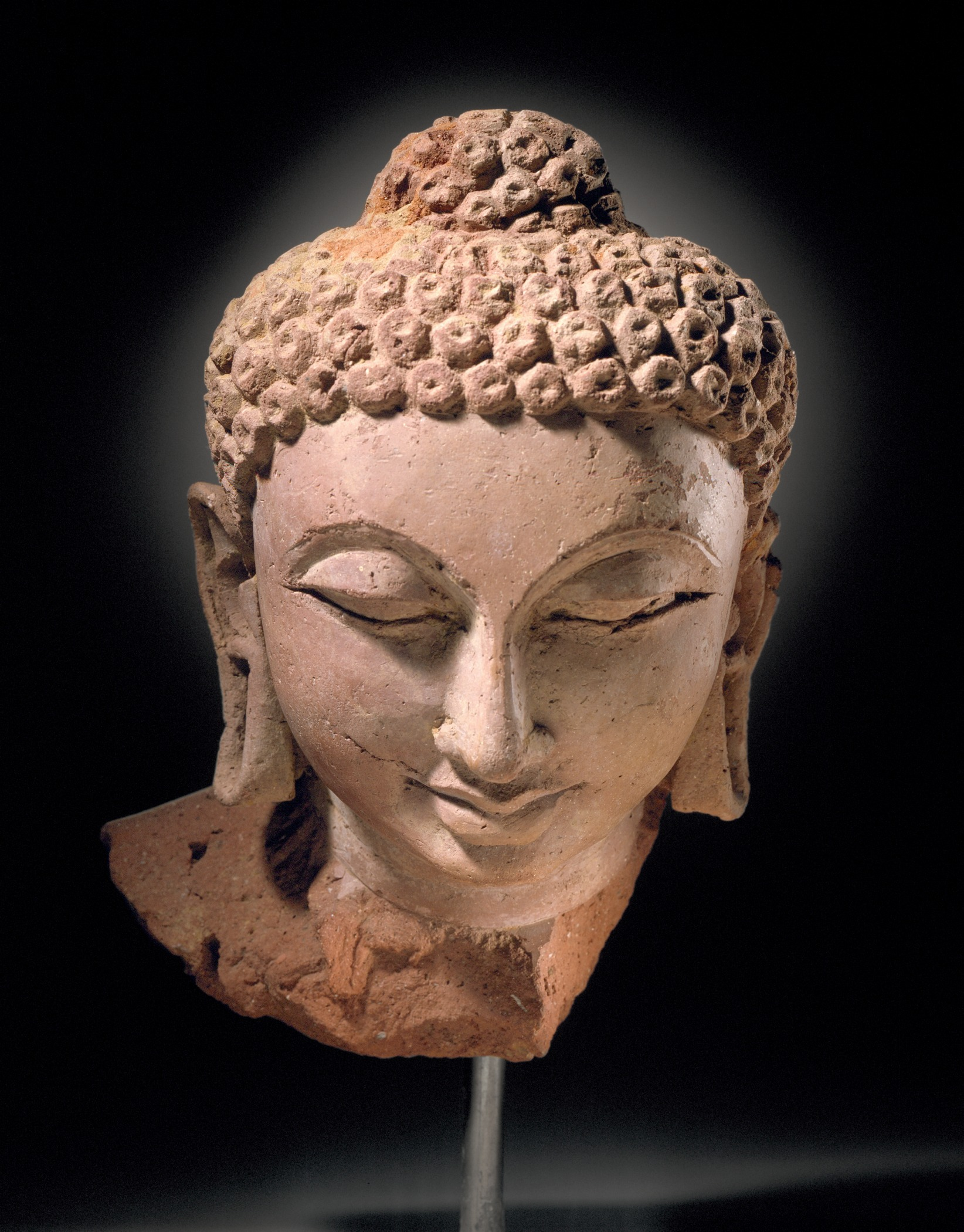
Head of Buddha Shakyamuni, Devnimori, Gujarat (375-400). Derived from the Greco-Buddhist art of Gandhara, an example of the Western Indian art of the Western Satraps.

Under Rudrasimha II, the Western Satraps are known to have maintained their presence in the Central Indian areas of Vidisha/Sanchi/Eran well into the 4th century: during his rule, in 319 CE, a Saka ruler inscribed the Kanakerha inscription, on the hill of Sanchi mentioning the construction of a well by the Saka chief and "righteous conqueror" (dharmaviyagi mahadandanayaka) Sridharavarman (339-368 CE). Another inscription of the same Sridhavarman with his military commander is known from Eran. These inscriptions point to the extent of Saka rule as of the time of Rudrasimha II.

The construction of Buddhist monuments in the area of Gujarat during the later part of Western Satrap rule is attested with the site of Devnimori, which incorporates viharas and a stupa. Coins of Rudrasimha were found inside the Buddhist stupa of Devnimori. The Buddha images in Devnimori clearly show the influence of the Greco-Buddhist art of Gandhara, and have been described as examples of the Western Indian art of the Western Satraps. It has been suggested that the art of Devnimori represented a Western Indian artistic tradition that was anterior to the rise of Gupta Empire art, and that it may have influenced not only the latter, but also the art of the Ajanta Caves, Sarnath and other places from the 5th century onward.

Overall, the Western Satraps may have played a role in the transmission of the art of Gandhara to the western Deccan region.
