= Nudity in religion =

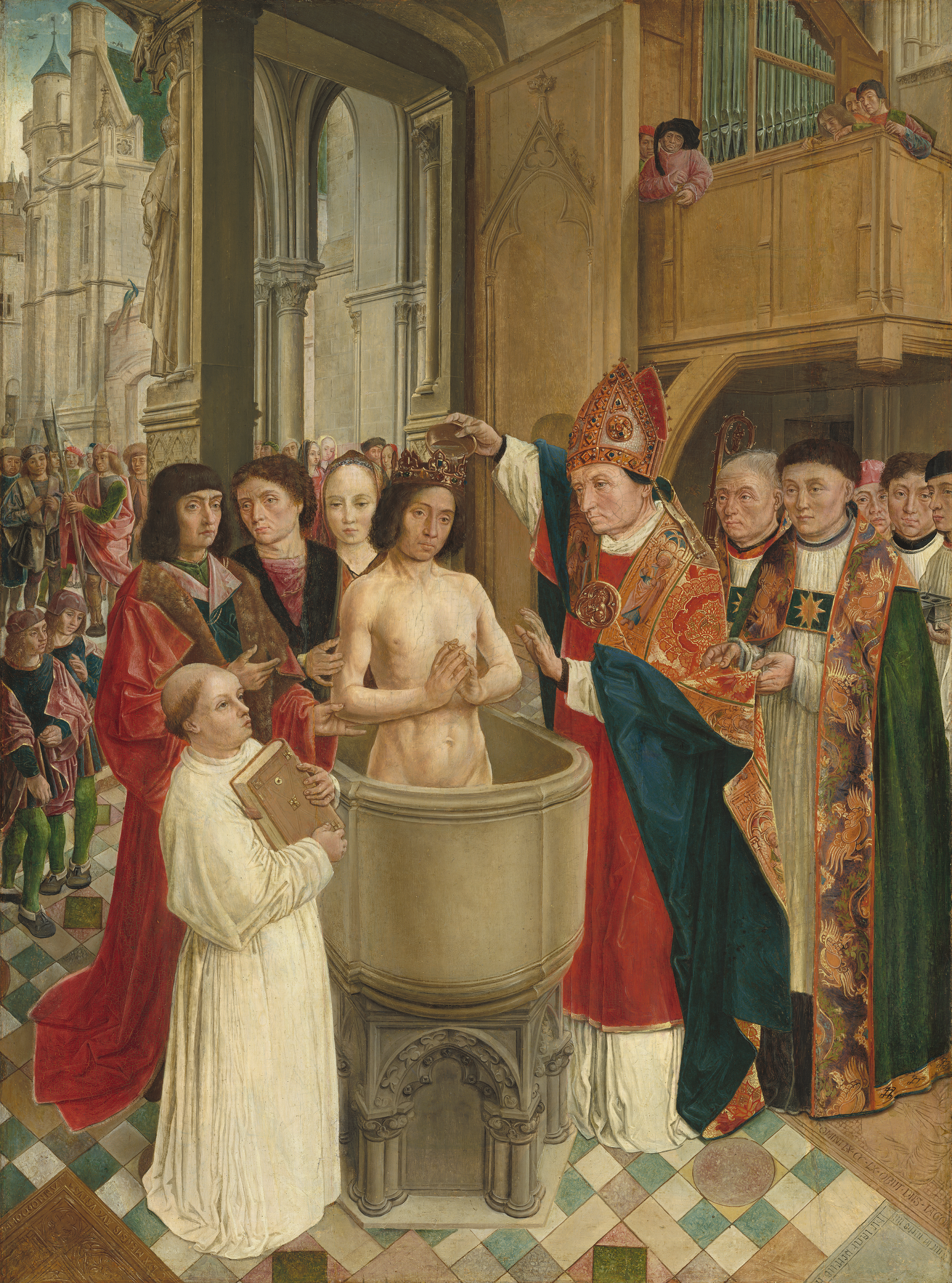
Baptism of Clovis I (496)

Nudity factors into various religious traditions and teachings, and forms part of the basis for modern attitudes and behaviors regarding nudity.

== Abrahamic religions ==
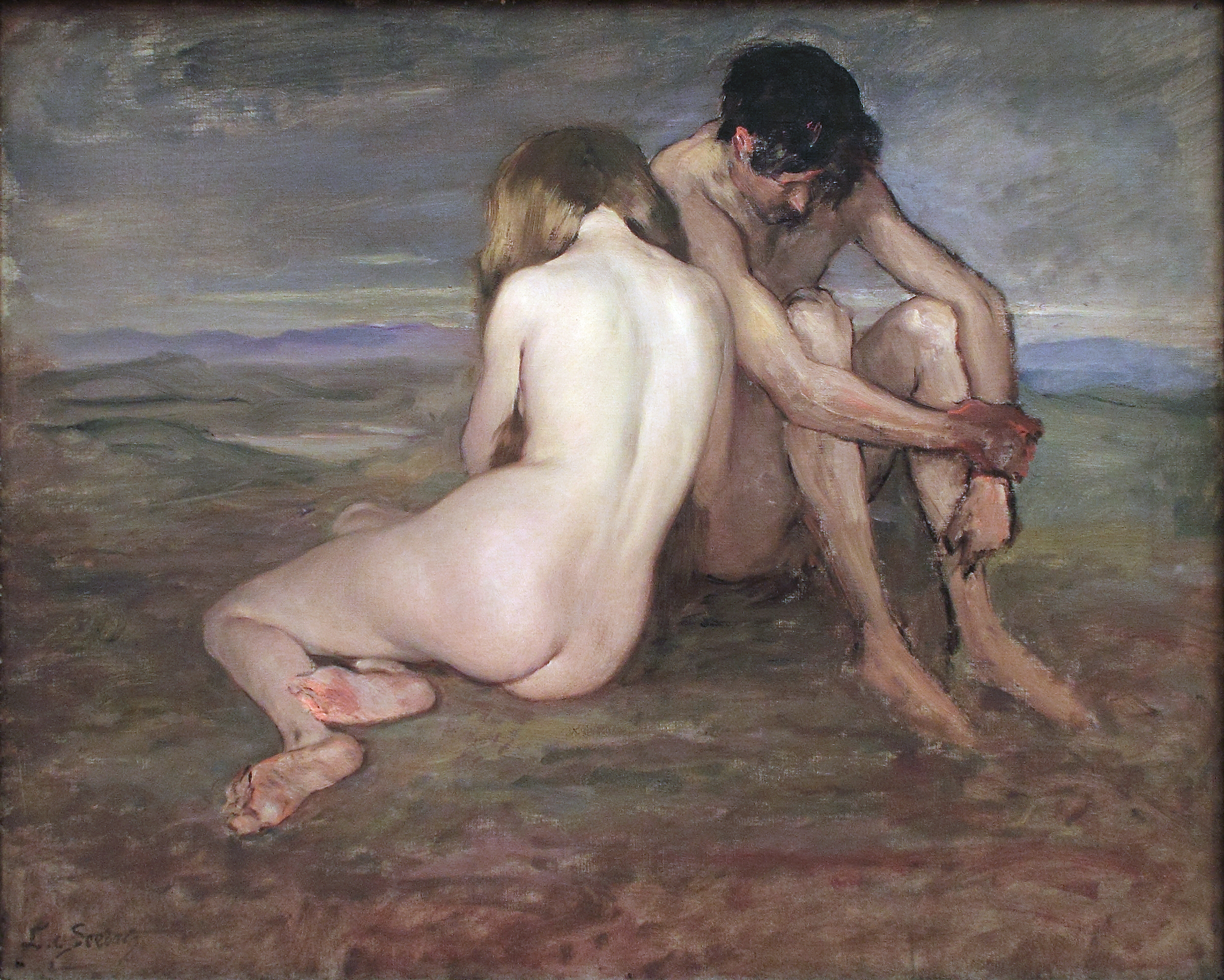
Adam and Eve, painting by Lothar von Seebach

The Abrahamic religions of Judaism, Christianity, and Islam all recount the Genesis creation narrative in which Adam and Eve are unaware of their nakedness until they eat the forbidden fruit of the Tree of Knowledge of Good and Evil. After this, they feel ashamed and try to cover themselves with fig leaves. Judaism does not share the Christian association of nakedness with original sin, an aspect integral to the doctrine of redemption and salvation. In Islam the garden is in Paradise, not on Earth. (Note: "So he brought about their fall through deception. And when they tasted of the tree, their nakedness was exposed to them, prompting them to cover themselves with leaves from Paradise. Then their Lord called out to them, "Did I not forbid you from that tree and ˹did I not˺ tell you that Satan is your sworn enemy?"" Quran 7:22) This is to show that women and men should be covered in clothing, for nudity has the stigma of shame attached to it. (Note: "O children of Adam! We have provided for you clothing to cover your nakedness and as an adornment. However, the best clothing is righteousness. This is one of Allah’s bounties, so perhaps you will be mindful." Quran 7:26) Each of these religions has its own unique understanding of what is meant to be taught with the recounting of the story of Adam and Eve.

The biblical story of Bathsheba and deutrocanonical story of Susanna provide no reference within the text for blame to be placed on women. Regardless, some have interpreted these passages placing the blame of the men's lusts on the women in the stories, despite the fact that the women are portrayed as victims in these stories rather than participants. In contrast, the deuterocanonical story of Judith portrays a woman who bathes publicly to seduce and later behead the enemy general Holofernes. Judith, in her deliberate attempts to seduce, contrasts with Susanna and Bathsheba, who were victims of the male gaze.

Of particular concern for both Islam and early Christians, as they extended their control over countries that had previously been part of the Byzantine or Roman empires, was the local custom of public bathing. While Christians were mainly concerned about mixed-gender bathing, which had been common, Islam also prohibited nudity for women in the company of non-Muslim women. In general, the Roman bathing facilities were adapted for separation of the genders, and the bathers retaining at least a loin-cloth as was the case in Victorian Turkish baths until the end of the 20th century.

=== Judaism ===
The Genesis creation narrative describes Adam and Eve as "naked and not ashamed" (Genesis 2:25) before eating from the Tree of Knowledge of Good and Evil. Awareness of nakedness as requiring covering comes only after the Fall (Genesis 3:7), presented as a consequence of disobedience rather than part of the original divine design. Judaism does not share the Christian association of nakedness with original sin, an aspect integral to Christian doctrines of redemption and salvation; in Jewish thought, shame arose from the knowledge of good and evil rather than from nakedness itself.

In practice, Judaism developed detailed norms around body modesty (Tzniut), though these vary considerably between movements and communities. In more strict (Orthodox) communities, tzniut encompasses detailed rules of appropriate behavior. Conservative and Reform Judaism generally promote modesty values but do not regard strict tzniut rules as binding, permitting individuals to set their own standards. With the exception of the Haredi community, Jewish communities generally dress according to the standards of the surrounding society.

Rabbinic sources distinguish between functional nudity and immodest exposure. The Talmud (Shabbos 118b) records that Rabbi Yossi dressed and undressed under his sheets to avoid standing bare even in private, which later authorities cite as pious practice rather than strict obligation. However, scholars note that male workers laboring in fields or fishing were commonly unclothed in ancient Palestine, as reflected in John 21:7 where Simon Peter is described as naked while fishing. A person entering a mikveh (ritual bath) does so without clothing or jewelry.

Orthodox Jewish Law (Halakha) traditionally placed greater concern on male nudity in religious contexts, viewing it as an offense against God, while female nudity was primarily addressed in terms of arousing sexual passion; thus private or female-only nudity was not inherently immodest. The category of ervah (nakedness) in halakhic literature is highly contextual—dependent on social norms, habituation, and setting rather than fixed body parts.

Care is needed when reading biblical texts, as some references to "nakedness" serve as euphemism for sexual activity. The story of Noah's nakedness involves Ham "seeing his father's nakedness," which many commentators interpret as involving more than mere viewing.

In the early twentieth century, anarcho-naturism attracted some Jewish immigrants in America as part of broader radical movements. Moyshe Yitzhok Littauer founded a vegetarian nudist colony in New Jersey in 1917 with approximately sixty Jewish immigrants from New York's Lower East Side, combining naturism with anarchist and vegetarian ideals. This represented a secular cultural phenomenon rather than a religious movement, and no representative Jewish religious teacher, whether Orthodox or Reform, has advocated naturism as compatible with Jewish practice.

=== Christianity ===
==== Mainstream Christian denominations ====
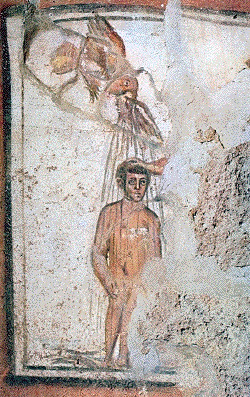
Representation of baptism in early Christian art

There are verses in the Christian Bible that discuss the issue of nudity. Before the fall of man, "Nakedness was 'very good' from the beginning, but its innocence was corrupted by the fall", a concept taught in Genesis 1:31 and Genesis 2:25. Genesis 3:8–10, Revelation 3:18 and Revelation 16:15 discuss that after the fall of man, "publicly exposed nakedness [became] a symbol of the shame of sin." In Genesis 3:7, Adam and Eve tried to cover their nakedness, though their attempt was inadequate for God and so God properly clothed humans in Genesis 3:21. Exodus 20:26 and 28:42–43 explicate that God instructed humans to cover their torso and thighs.

The early Church reflected the contemporary attitudes of Judaism towards nudity. The Old Testament is not positive towards nudity. In Isaiah 20, Isaiah walks nude as a sign of shame.

The first recorded liturgy of baptism, written down by Saint Hippolytus of Rome in his Apostolic Tradition, required men, women and children to remove all clothing, including all foreign objects such as jewelry and hair fastenings. However Laurie Guy argues that complete nudity for baptism candidates (especially women) would not be the norm. He notes that at certain times and in certain places candidates may have been totally naked at the point of baptism, but the Jewish taboo of female nakedness would have mitigated widespread practice of naked baptism.

Later Christian attitudes to nudity became more restrictive, and baptisms were segregated by sex and then later were usually performed with clothed participants. Some of the Eastern Orthodox churches today maintain the early church's liturgical use of baptismal nudity, particularly for infants but also for adults.

Several saints, such as a number of the Desert Fathers as well as Basil Fool for Christ, practiced nudity as a form of ascetic poverty.

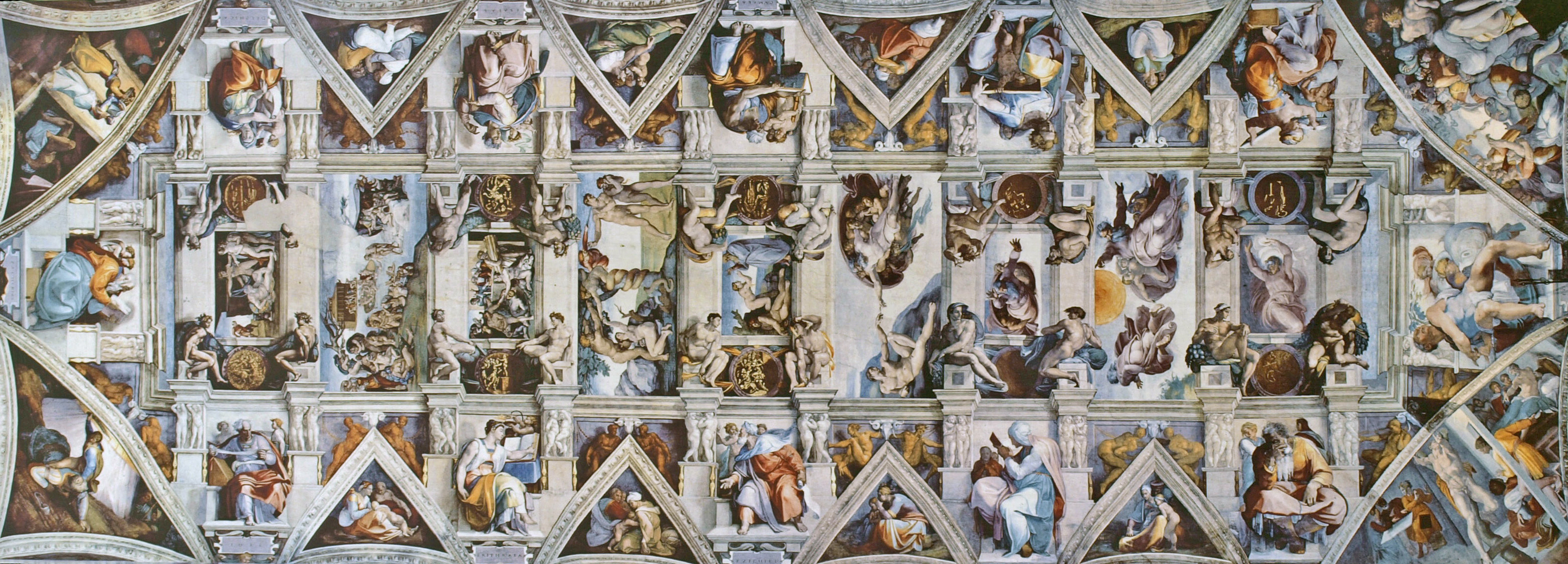
The Sistine Chapel ceiling by Michelangelo

Early Christian art included depictions of nudity in baptism. When artistic endeavours revived following the Renaissance, the Catholic Church was a major sponsor of art bearing a religious theme, many of which included subjects in various states of dress and including full nudity. Painters sponsored by the Church included Raphael, Caravaggio and Michelangelo, but there were many others. Many of these paintings and statues were and continue to be displayed in churches, some of which were painted as murals, the most famous of which are at the Sistine Chapel painted by Michelangelo.

Smith (1966), in discussing logion 37 (Note: Jesus' disciples ask, "When will you be revealed to us and when will we see you? Jesus said: When you unclothe yourselves without being ashamed and take off your clothes and put them under your feet as little children and tread on them, then [shall you see] the Son of the Living One and you shall not fear".) of the Gospel of Thomas, notes that early Christian art depicts, as one would expect, Adam and Eve in Paradise naked. The only other Old Testament figures who are depicted nude are Jonah emerging from the mouth of the Great Fish, Daniel emerging from the Lion's Den, and the resurrected in Ezekiel's vision of the dry bones: these Old Testament scenes containing nude figures are precisely those which were held to be types of the resurrection. Among the New Testament illustrations, apart from baptismal scenes, there are nudes only in one representation of the raising of Lazarus and one representation of the Miracle at Cana.

In light of Exodus 29:26 and 28:42–43 in the Bible, which teach that nakedness is inclusive of anything that exposes the torso and thighs, Methodists of the conservative holiness movement wear pants or dresses that go beyond the knees, as well as shirts that cover the underarms.

In 1981, Pope John Paul II expressed the Catholic Church's attitude to the exposure of the human body in Love and Responsibility: "The human body can remain nude and uncovered and preserve intact its splendour and its beauty... Nakedness as such is not to be equated with physical shamelessness... Immodesty is present only when nakedness plays a negative role with regard to the value of the person... The human body is not in itself shameful... Shamelessness (just like shame and modesty) is a function of the interior of a person."

==== Christian naturist sects ====
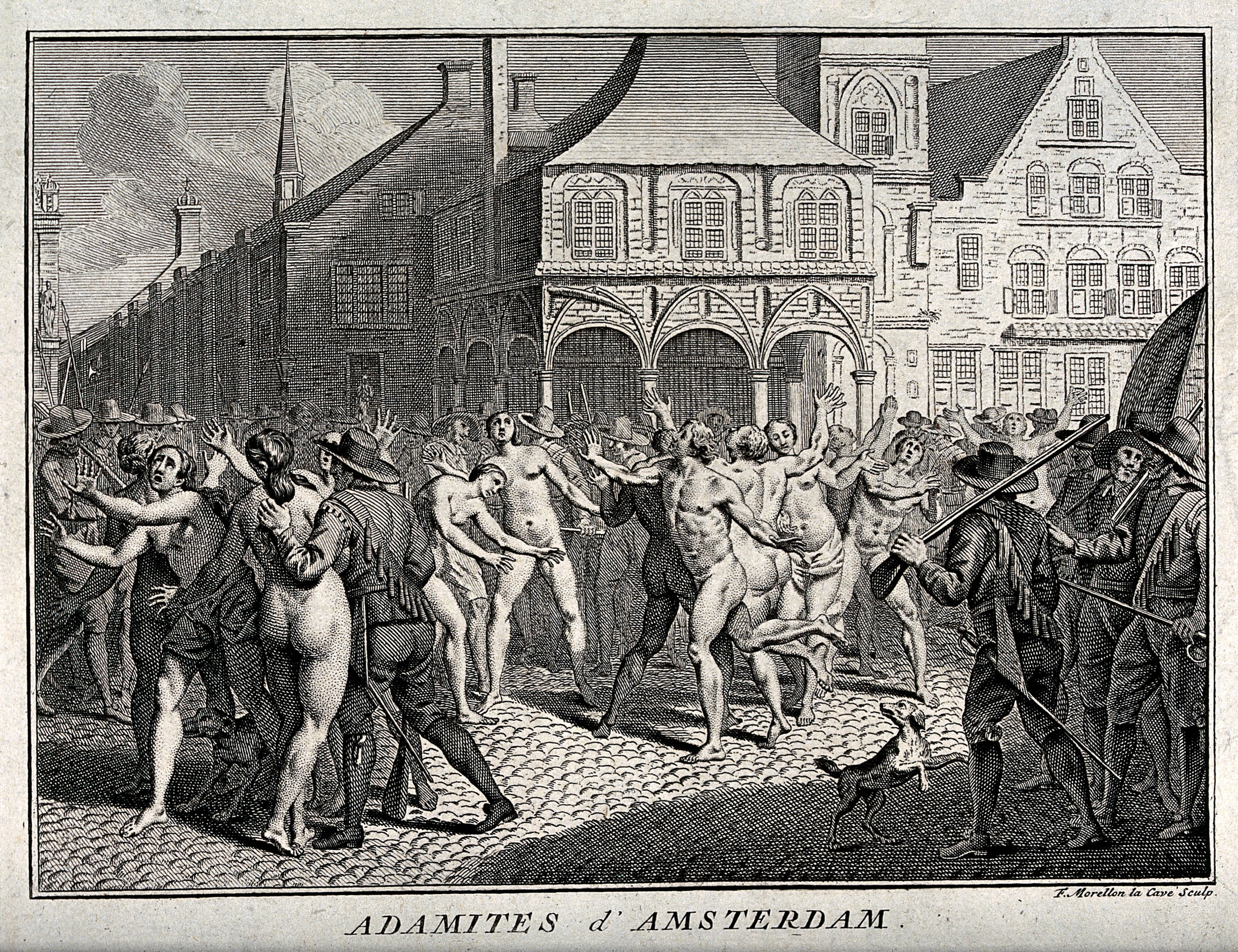
The arrest of Adamites in a public square in Amsterdam

Sects have arisen within Christianity from time to time that have viewed nudity in a more positive light. For example, to the Adamites and the Freedomites, social nudity was an integral part of their ritual. The Adamites, an early Christian sect, practiced "holy nudism", engaging in common worship in the nude. During the Middle Ages, the doctrines of this obscure sect were revived: in the Netherlands by the Brethren of the Free Spirit and the Taborites in Bohemia, and, in a grosser form, by the Beghards in Germany. Everywhere, they met with firm opposition from the mainstream Christian churches.

A religious sect in Canada that immigrated from Russia, the Sons of Freedom, went so far in the 20th century (1903–1950s) as to publicly strip in mass public demonstrations to protest against government policies which were meant to assimilate them.

Christian naturism contains various members associated with most denominations. Although beliefs vary, a common theme is that much of Christianity has misinterpreted the events regarding the Garden of Eden, and God was displeased with Adam and Eve for covering their bodies with fig leaves. De Clercq (2011) argues that the significance of the human need for clothing by far exceeds its theological meaning.

=== Islam ===
The practice known as purdah, i.e. the veiling of women in public, predates Islam in Persia, Assyria, and India. Islamic clothing for men covers the area from the waist to the knees. In the medieval period, Islamic norms became more patriarchal, and very concerned with the chastity of women before marriage and fidelity afterward. Women were not only veiled, but segregated from society, with no contact with men not of close kinship, the presence of whom defined the difference between public and private spaces.

Islamic countries are guided by rules of modesty that forbid nudity, with variations between five schools of Islamic law. The most conservative is the Hanbali School in Saudi Arabia and Qatar, where it is widespread for women wear the niqab, the garment covering the whole body and the face with a narrow opening for the eyes. Hands are also hidden within sleeves as much as possible. The burqa, limited mainly to Afghanistan, also has a mesh screen which covers the eye opening. Different rules apply to men, women, and children; and depend upon the gender and family relationship of others present. The Sunni scholar Yusuf al-Qaradawi states that looking at the intimate parts of the body of another of either sex must be avoided. For women after puberty, the prohibition includes the entire body except the hands and face. However, hands and face may be shown only if they may be viewed without temptation. Men must cover themselves from the navel to the knees. Shame dictates that the genitals should be covered even when a person is alone. The dress of women must not only cover virtually the entire body, but cannot be either transparent or close-fitting to reveal the shape of the body. When onlookers are close relations, prohibitions for women do not include hair, ears, neck, upper part of the chest, arms and legs. The same exceptions are also made for men seeing women to whom they are proposing marriage.

While mainstream Islamic jurisprudence mandates modesty, certain antinomian Sufi movements and individuals have historically practiced ritualistic or approved nudity as a form of spiritual expression. Beginning around the twelfth century, itinerant dervish orders such as the Qalandariyya deliberately violated social and religious norms, with practices including "dirt-caked nakedness" that served as a marker of "wild social transcendence" and a rejection of societal demands. In Sufi literature, a figure known as the majdhub (the "enraptured one")—who, under the shock of a mystical vision, is bereft of his senses—was described as walking around "stark naked," a state considered to belong to "the darker side of the Sufi world" and explicitly prohibited by religious law. The 14th-century Kashmiri mystic and poet Lalleshwari is venerated by both Hindus and Muslims in Kashmir and is said to have wandered in a nude state, dancing and singing in ecstatic frenzy. In Java, the heterodox Sufi tradition of Dul Birahi, as described in the early nineteenth-century Serat Tjentini, included ritual nakedness and sexual promiscuity as integral components of the dhikr (remembrance of God) ceremony. These practices have consistently been rejected by mainstream Sunni and Shi'a authorities as deviant and contrary to Islamic law.

== Indian religions ==
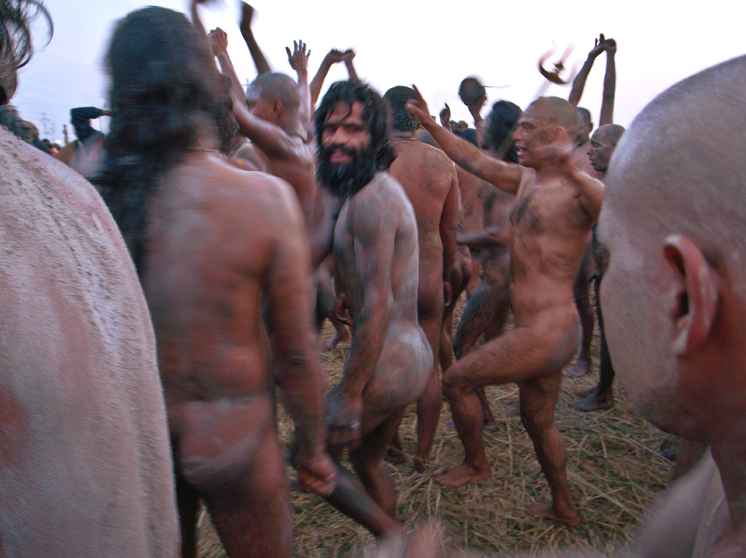
Naga mystics, at the Hindu bathing ceremony of Ardha Kumbh Mela, at Allahabad

In ancient Indian cultures, there was a tradition of extreme asceticism (minoritarian) that included full nudity. This tradition continued from the gymnosophists (philosophers in antiquity) to certain holy men (who may however cover themselves with ashes) in present-day Hindu devotion and in Jainism.

In the 4th century BC, Alexander the Great encountered, in India, wandering groups of naked holy men whom he dubbed the naked philosophers (Gr gymnos: naked; sophist: knowledge). The philosopher Onesicritus investigated their beliefs and lifestyle. Pyrrho the Sceptic was impressed and incorporated nudity into his philosophy. The Gymnosophists were Hindus, but Jain and Ajivika monks practiced nudity as a statement that they had given up all worldly goods.

=== Hinduism ===
==== Philosophical basis ====
The philosophical basis of nudity arises out of the concept of 'Purushartha' (four ends of human life). 'Purushartha' (Puruṣārtha) are 'Kama' (enjoyment), 'Artha' (wealth), ‘Dharma’ (virtue) and 'Moksha' (liberation). It is ‘Purushartha’ which impels a human being towards nudity or any of its related aspect(s) either for spiritual aim or for the aim of enjoyment. Practice of ‘Dharma’ (virtue) brings good result(s) and non-practice of 'Dharma' leads to negative result(s).

===== Spiritual basis =====
In the spiritual aspect of Hinduism nudity symbolises renunciation of the highest type. A nude person or deity (for example, some depictions of Kali) denotes one who is devoid of maya or attachment to the body and one who is an embodiment of infinity. Trailanga Swami, the famous nude saint of India, had given an explanation for nudity in religion in the following words, "Lahiri Mahasaya is like a divine kitten, remaining wherever the Cosmic Mother has placed him. While dutifully playing the part of a worldly man, he has received that perfect Self-realization which I have sought by renouncing everything – even my loincloth!"

===== Material basis =====
In comparison, in the material aspect nudity is considered an art. This view is supported by Sri Aurobindo in his book The Renaissance in India. He says about Hinduism in the book – "Its spiritual extremism could not prevent it from fathoming through a long era the life of the senses and its enjoyments, and there too it sought the utmost richness of sensuous detail and the depths and intensities of sensual experience. Yet it is notable that this pursuit of the most opposite extremes never resulted in disorder…" Extreme hedonists and materialists like the Charvakas are very candid with regard to pursuing of sensual pleasures. They say, "Marthakamaveva purusharthau" (Riches and pleasure is the summum bonum of life). There is another sloka in support of their view – "Anganalingananadijanyam sukhameva purusatha" (The sensual pleasure arising from the embrace of a woman and other objects is the highest good or end). For non-hedonists pursuing kama (sensual pleasures) accompanied with dharma (virtue) can be the highest ideal or goal in life. There is nothing wrong in it.

==== Occurrence ====
Some of the famous nude male and female yogi (male and female saints of India) of Hinduism include Akka Mahadevi, Lalla Yogishwari (Lalleshwari), Trailanga Swami, Harihar Baba, Tota Puri. Also in the biography of saint Gorakhnath we have reference to nude male and female yogis who had visited the famous Amarnath Temple during medieval period of India.

Among the Hindu religious sects, only the sadhus (monks) of the Nāga sect can be seen nude. They usually wear a loin-cloth around their waist, but not always; and usually remain in their Akhara or deep forest or isolation and come out in public only once every four years during Kumbh Mela. They have a very long history and are warrior monks, who usually also carry a talwar (sword), trishula (trident), bhala (javelin) or such weapons, and in medieval times have fought many wars to protect Hindu temples and shrines.

=== Jainism ===
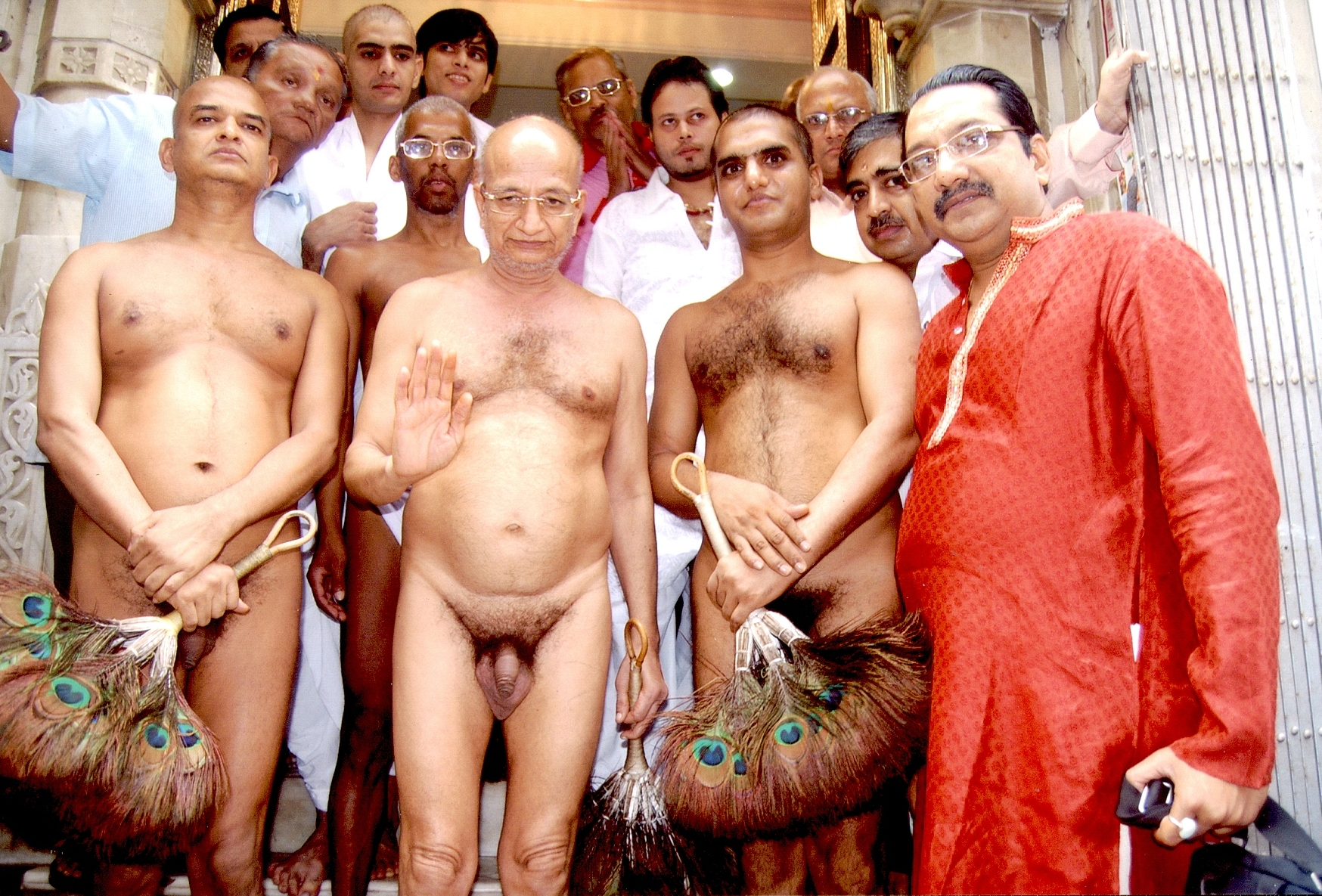
Digambara monk Acarya Pushpadantasagara with nude monks

In India, Digambara monks reject any form of clothing and practice nudity. Digambara (lit. 'sky clad') is one of the two main sects of Jainism. However, the Shvetambara sect is "white-clad" and their holy statues may or may not wear a loin cloth as seen in artefacts excavated from the Kankali Tila.

== New religious movements ==
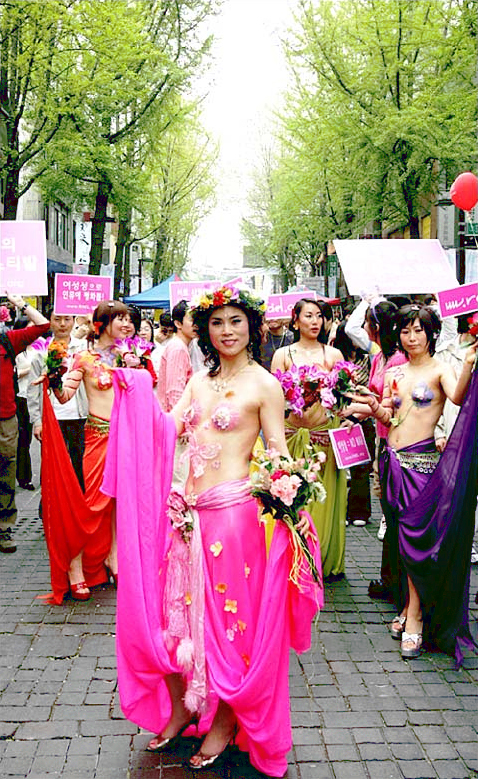
Raelians in South Korea

=== Neopaganism ===
In many modern neopagan religious movements, such as Wicca, social and ritual nudity is (relatively) commonplace. In Wicca, the term skyclad refers to ritual nudity instead of social nudity.

=== Raëlism ===
In Raëlism, nudity is not problematic. Raëlists in North America have formed GoTopless.org, which organizes demonstrations in support of topfreedom on the basis of the legal and public attitudes to the gender inequality. GoTopless sponsors an annual "Go Topless Day" protest (also known as "National GoTopless Day", "International Go-Topless Day", etc.) in advocacy for women's right to go topless on gender equality grounds.
