= Skyclad =

Skyclad may refer to:

- Digambara, a sect of Jainism often translated as "sky clad"
- Skyclad (Neopaganism), the practice of ritual nudity in Neopaganism
- Skyclad (band), a British folk metal band
