= Adamites =

Early Christian sect in North Africa

- Classification: Christianity
- Orientation: Gnostic (disputed)
- Founder: Prodicus (attributed)
- Origin: 2nd century North Africa (according to Epiphanius)
- Other name: Adamiani
- The historical existence of a distinct Adamite sect is disputed by modern scholars; the term may represent a heresiological construct.

The Adamites, also called Adamians, were adherents of an early Christian sect reportedly active in North Africa during the 2nd through 4th centuries. According to ancient sources, the group practiced ritual nudity, believing they had regained the primeval innocence of Adam and Eve before the Fall. Similar beliefs and practices were attributed to various groups in medieval and early modern Europe, whose adherents were also labeled Adamites by contemporary chroniclers.

== Ancient Adamites ==
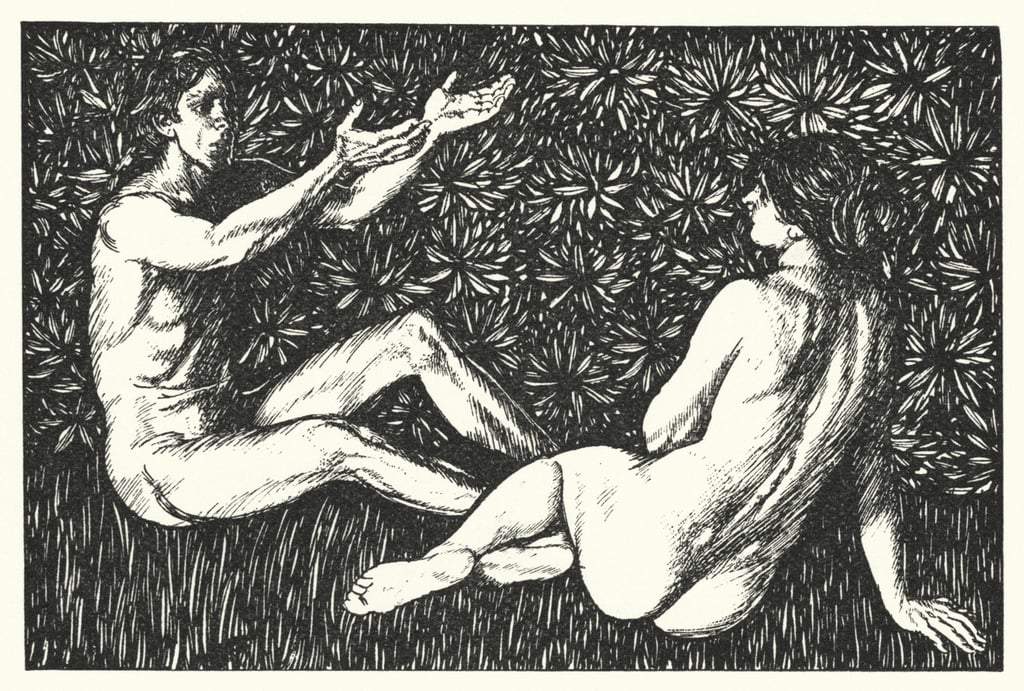
1898 illustration by E. J. Sullivan, heading to "Adamitism", chapter IX of Sartor Resartus (1833–34) by Thomas Carlyle

=== Sources and historical reliability ===
Knowledge of the ancient Adamites derives almost entirely from the writings of early Christian heresiologists. The principal source is Epiphanius of Salamis, who described the sect in his Panarion (c. 374–377 CE), a compendium of eighty heresies. Augustine of Hippo also mentioned the Adamites in his De Haeresibus, and Theodoret discussed them in his Compendium of Heretical Fables.

Modern scholars approach these accounts with caution. Epiphanius himself admitted that he knew of the Adamites only from hearsay and expressed uncertainty about whether they constituted a distinct sect. The historian Robert Lerner has emphasized that medieval and ancient heresiological literature frequently attributed similar transgressive practices to disparate groups, often copying from earlier catalogues of heresies rather than basing descriptions on direct observation. Peter van Egmond, writing in the Brill Encyclopedia of Early Christianity, notes that Theodoret's account contradicts Epiphanius's, with one emphasizing promiscuity and the other asceticism, "highlighting confusing narratives" about the sect's actual practices.

=== Reported beliefs and practices ===
According to the heresiological sources, the Adamites called their place of worship "Paradise" and claimed that through their practices they had been restored to Adam and Eve's state of innocence before the Fall. Members reportedly conducted religious services without clothing and rejected marriage as an institution that would not have existed without sin.

Ancient writers disagreed about the sect's origins and character. Theodoret considered them an offshoot of the Carpocratians, a group associated with sensual mysticism and rejection of conventional morality. Other accounts portrayed them as extreme ascetics who sought to overcome carnal desires through austere living. The heresiologists accused the Adamites of antinomian beliefs—holding that their actions could be neither good nor bad. Van Egmond suggests the sect likely emerged in the mid-4th century in regions such as Cyprus, Cilicia, or Syria, based on contextual clues in Epiphanius's writings.

== Medieval and early modern movements ==
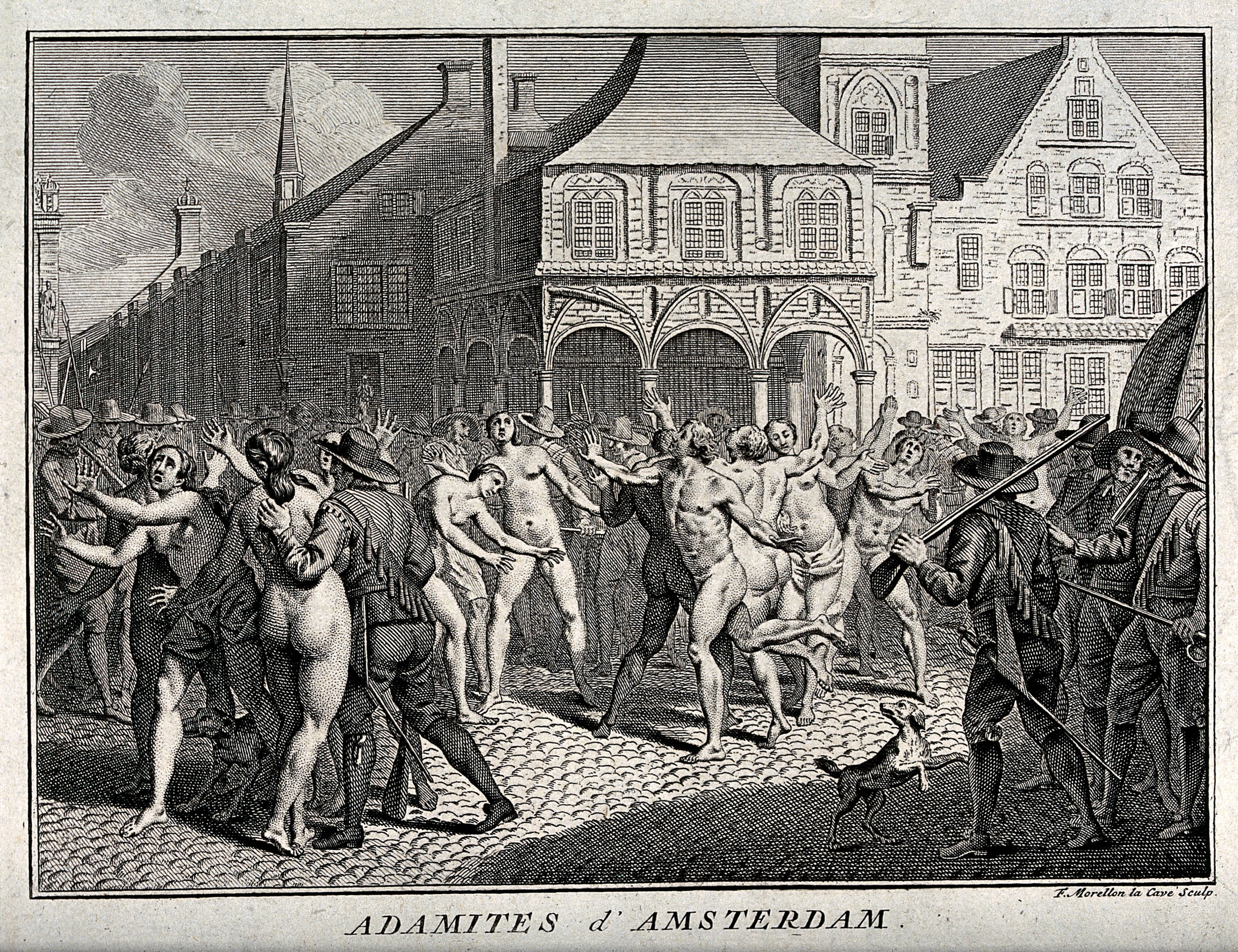
The arrest of Adamites in a public square in Amsterdam (engraving, mid-18th century).

Beginning in the 13th century, chroniclers applied the term "Adamites" to various European groups accused of practicing ritual nudity. Van Egmond observes that medieval heresiology "repurposed the term 'Adamites' to label various sects involved in nude, mixed worship," transforming ancient accounts "into a polemical tool against a range of contemporary movements." Hostile pamphleteers wrote that Adamites participated in sexual orgies. They were associated with witches and said to act with the inspiration or presence of Satan. Whether these groups had any connection to the ancient sect, or to each other, remains unclear.

=== Brethren of the Free Spirit ===
In the 13th-century Netherlands, members of the Brethren of the Free Spirit were sometimes called Adamites. Robert Lerner's definitive study of this movement concluded that the Free Spirit was "not a tightly organized sect of anarchistic deviants, but rather a spectrum of belief that emphasized voluntary poverty and quietist mysticism." Lerner cautioned against accepting at face value the sensationalized accusations made by inquisitors and chroniclers, noting that standardized lists of questions could produce similar-sounding confessions from unconnected individuals.

Reports of nude rituals among heretical groups became widespread in the 14th century, and chroniclers frequently labeled such groups as Adamites, though the accuracy of these reports is disputed.

=== Bohemian Adamites ===
Adamites being burned in Hussite wars

The most extensively documented medieval Adamites emerged from the Taborite movement in 15th-century Bohemia. The Taborites had formed in 1419 as a radical branch of Hussitism, opposing both the Holy Roman Empire and the Catholic Church. A splinter group, known as the Bohemian Adamites or Pikarti, broke from the main Taborite movement and adopted more extreme practices.

According to the historian Norman Cohn, the Bohemian Adamites established a commune on an island in the Nežárka river, where they practiced social nudity, rejected marriage in favor of free love, and held property in common. They reportedly held ritual dances around fires and preached that "God dwelt in the Saints of the Last Days." Cohn noted that while the mainstream Taborites practiced strict monogamy, the Adamites "declared that the chaste were unworthy to enter the Messianic Kingdom." However, Cohn also observed that "the charges against their moral character are in the highest degree suspicious," as similar accusations were routinely leveled against medieval heretics.

The Bohemian Adamites differed from the Taborites on theological matters, rejecting transubstantiation, the priesthood, and the Eucharist. In 1421, the Taborite military leader Jan Žižka attacked the Adamite settlement and suppressed the sect. Howard Kaminsky's study of the Hussite revolution places this suppression in the context of the Taborites' own efforts to consolidate their movement and distance themselves from more radical elements.

The conflict between the Adamites and Taborites is depicted in Against All (1958), the third film in Otakar Vávra's Hussite trilogy.

=== Later references ===
During the religious fragmentation accompanying the Wars of the Three Kingdoms in the 17th century, Adamites appeared in the Catalogue of the Several Sects and Opinions in England, indicating continued use of the term, whether to describe an actual group or as a polemical category.

== See also ==
- Christian naturism
- Nudity in religion
- Brethren of the Free Spirit
- Taborites
- Hussites
