= Skyclad (Neopaganism) =

Ritual nudity in Wicca

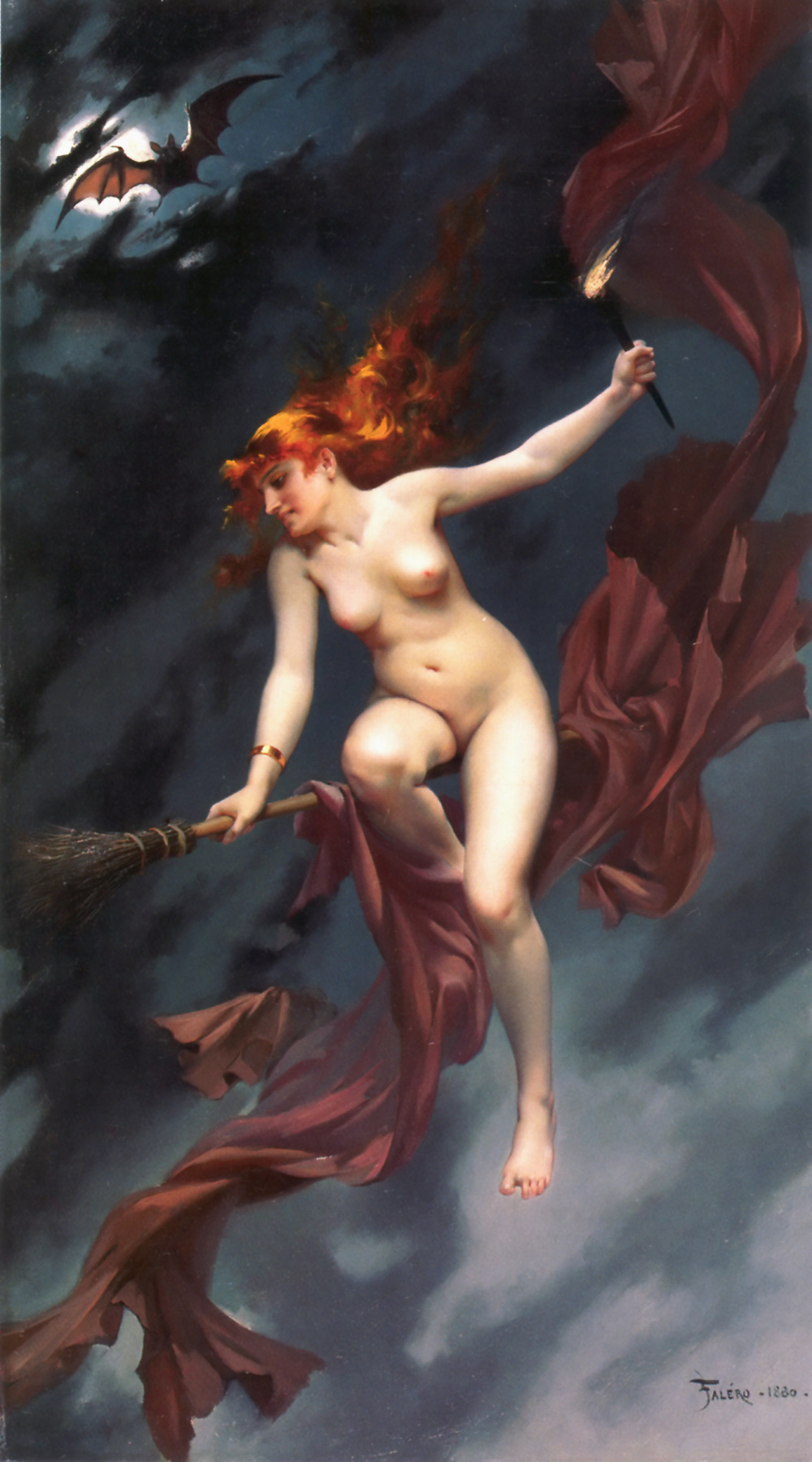
Artistic representation of a skyclad witch in Festival of the Witches by Luis Ricardo Falero, 1880

Skyclad refers to ritual nudity in Wicca and Modern Paganism. Some groups, or Traditions, perform most or all of their rituals skyclad. Whilst nudity and the practice of witchcraft have long been associated in the visual arts, this contemporary ritual nudity is typically attributed to either the influence of Gerald Gardner or to a passage from Charles Godfrey Leland's 1899 book Aradia, or the Gospel of the Witches, and as such is mainly attributed to the Gardnerian and Aradian covens.

== Origins ==
=== Gardner ===
Gardner's Witchcraft Today was published in 1954. The book claimed to report on the contemporary practice of Pagan religious witchcraft in England, which had supposedly survived as an underground religion for centuries. Ritual nudity was included as a regular part of Wiccan practice, but in the modern day it is mainly used by Alexandrian, Georgian, and Blue Star Wiccans. The "Charge of the Goddess", a part of Gardnerian ritual liturgy, does instruct Wiccans to practice ritual in the nude. Gardner spent several years in India, and may have picked up the concept from the Digambara Jains, a religious sect in which the monks may not wear clothing.

The term Digambara literally means "sky-clad". England had close links with India at the time when Wicca first became public in England, so this usage could well have been familiar to English speakers with a knowledge of Far Eastern religions. In particular, Gerald Gardner, who first popularized Wicca in England, was a noted folklorist with an interest in Far Eastern culture who spent much of his adult life in Ceylon and Burma, so it's plausible he was familiar with this Jain term.

Dr. Leo Ruickbie also notes that the traditional and artistic representation of witches cannot be overlooked as a source for nudity in Gardner's system, citing artists such as Albrecht Dürer and Salvator Rosa.

=== Aradia ===
The origins of this instruction have been traced to Aradia, or the Gospel of the Witches. The following speech by Aradia appears at the end of the book's first chapter;

And as the sign that ye are truly free,
Ye shall be naked in your rites, both men
And women also: this shall last until
The last of your oppressors shall be dead;

Doreen Valiente, one of Gardner's priestesses, recalls Gardner's surprise at Valiente's recognition of material from Aradia in the original version of the "Charge" that she was given. Valiente later rewrote the "Charge", preserving the lines from Aradia. Valiente's version was then widely circulated and reprinted.

Accepting Aradia as the source of skyclad practice, Robert Chartowich points to the 1998 Pazzaglini translation of these lines, which read "Men and Women / You will all be naked, until / Yet he shall be dead, the last / Of your oppressors is dead." Chartowich argues that the ritual nudity of Wicca was based upon Leland's mistranslation of these lines by incorporating the clause "in your rites".

=== Outside Wiccan traditions ===
Ritual nudity is not exclusive to traditional Wicca. Amongst those groups that do, only some rituals may involve ritual nudity. The Arician tradition, as an example, practices skyclad for six months of the year, and performs their ceremonies in ritual robes for the other half of the year. Within, and especially outside of, specific areas of Wicca and Pagan, reasons other than tradition may be given to explain a preference for skyclad worship. Starhawk states in Spiral Dance, "The naked body represents truth, the truth that goes deeper than social custom" and "is a sign that a Witch's loyalty is to the truth before any ideology or any comforting illusions."
