= Kankali Tila =

Mound located in the Indian state of Uttar Pradesh

- Jaini Mound
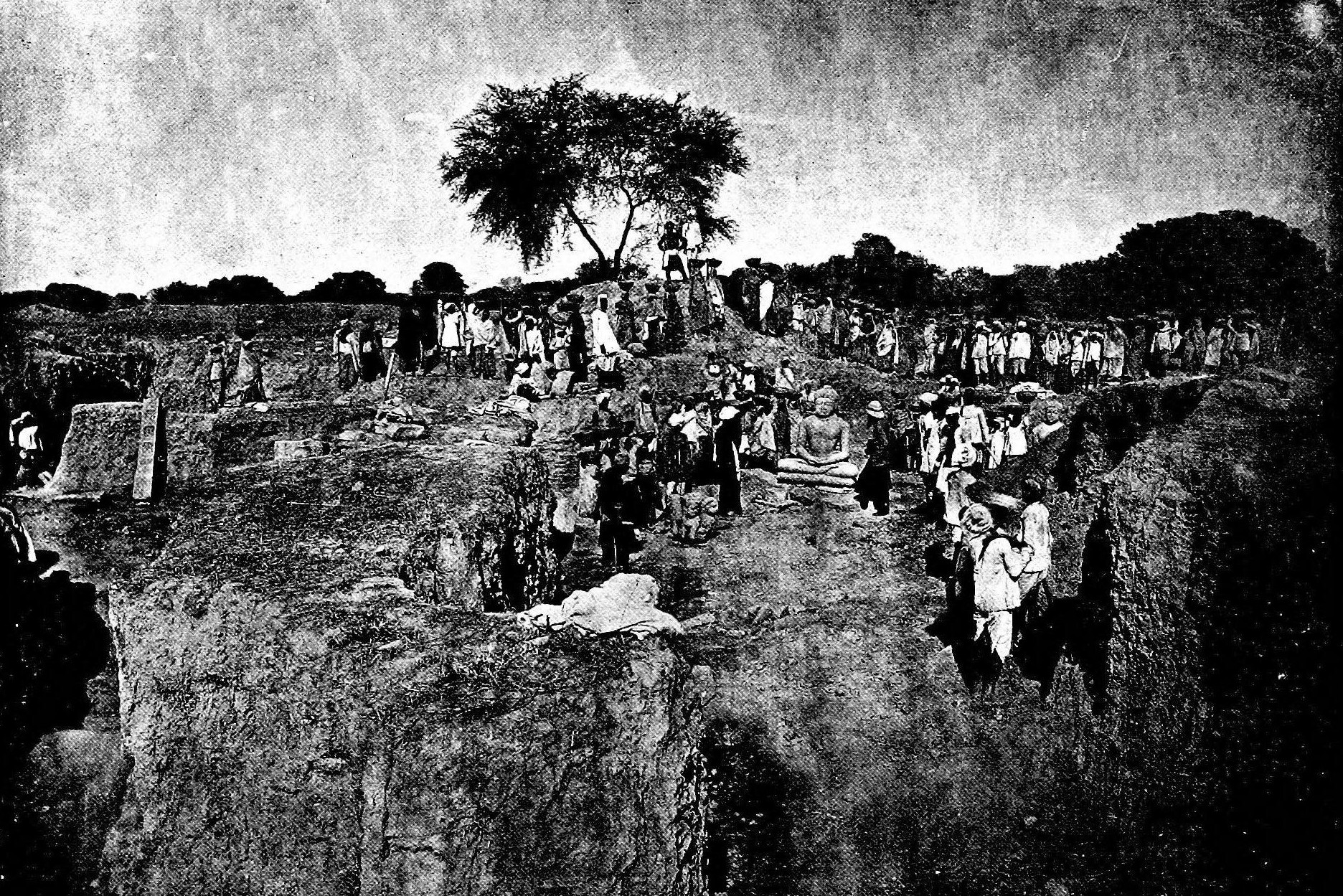
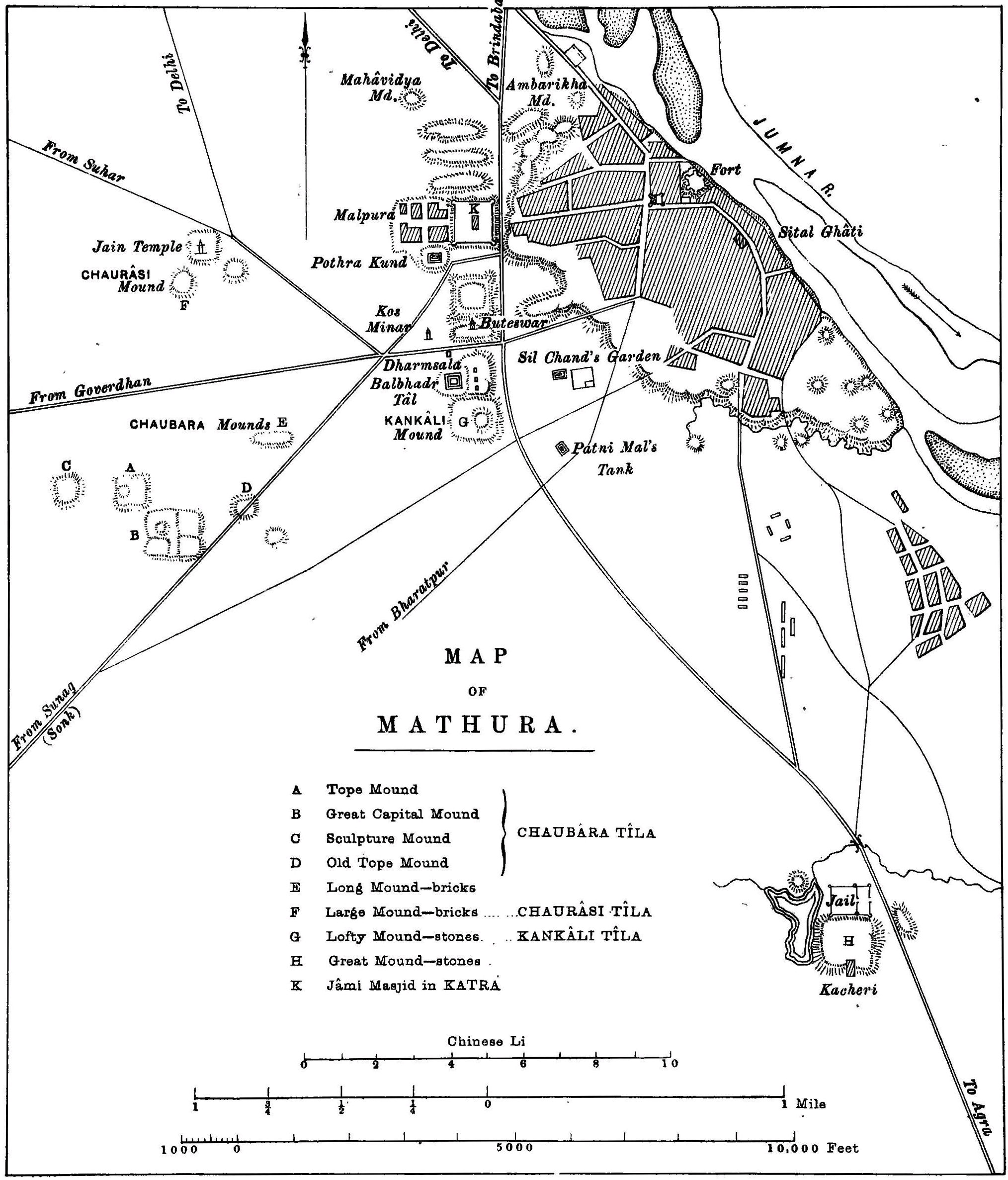
- General view of the excavations at Kankali Tila in January 1889 Kankali Mound in Map of Mathura (1901)

- Location within India Location within Uttar Pradesh Location within Asia
- 27°29′29″N 77°40′26″E

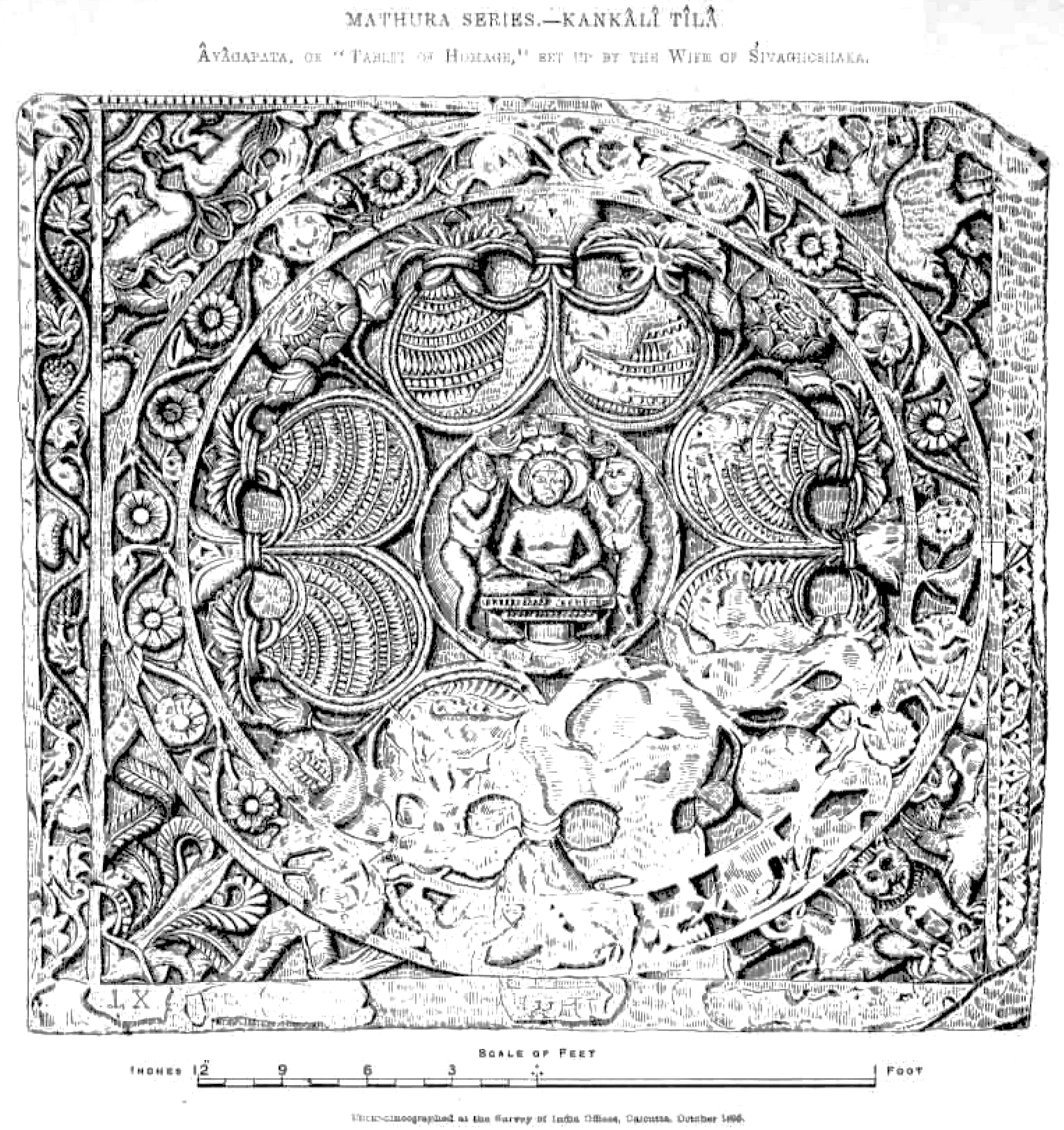
Pārśvanātha āyāgapaṭa, a tablet of homage to Parshvanatha, dates back to 15 CE

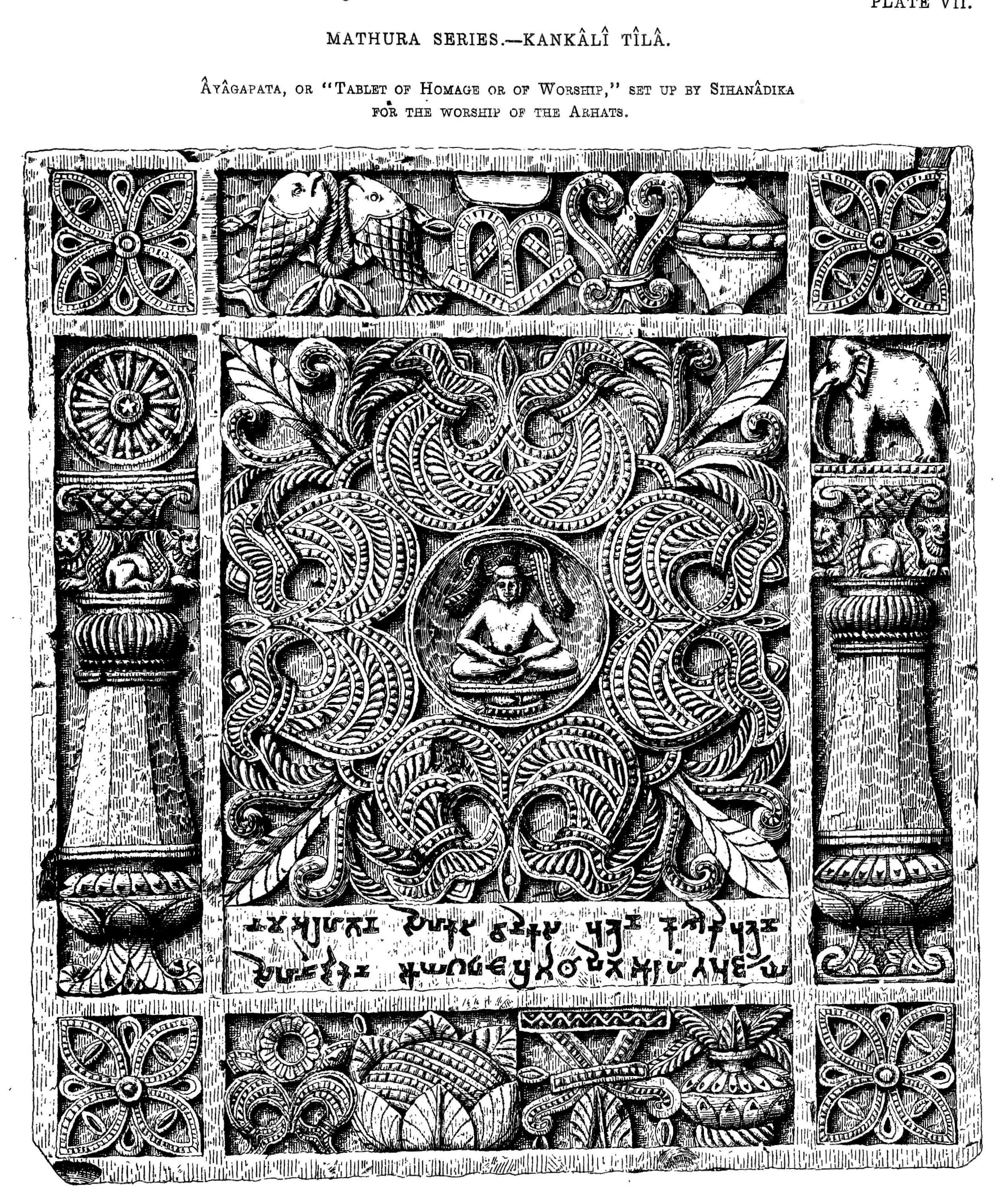
Ayagapata votive plate excavated from Kankali Tila, c. 25-50 CE

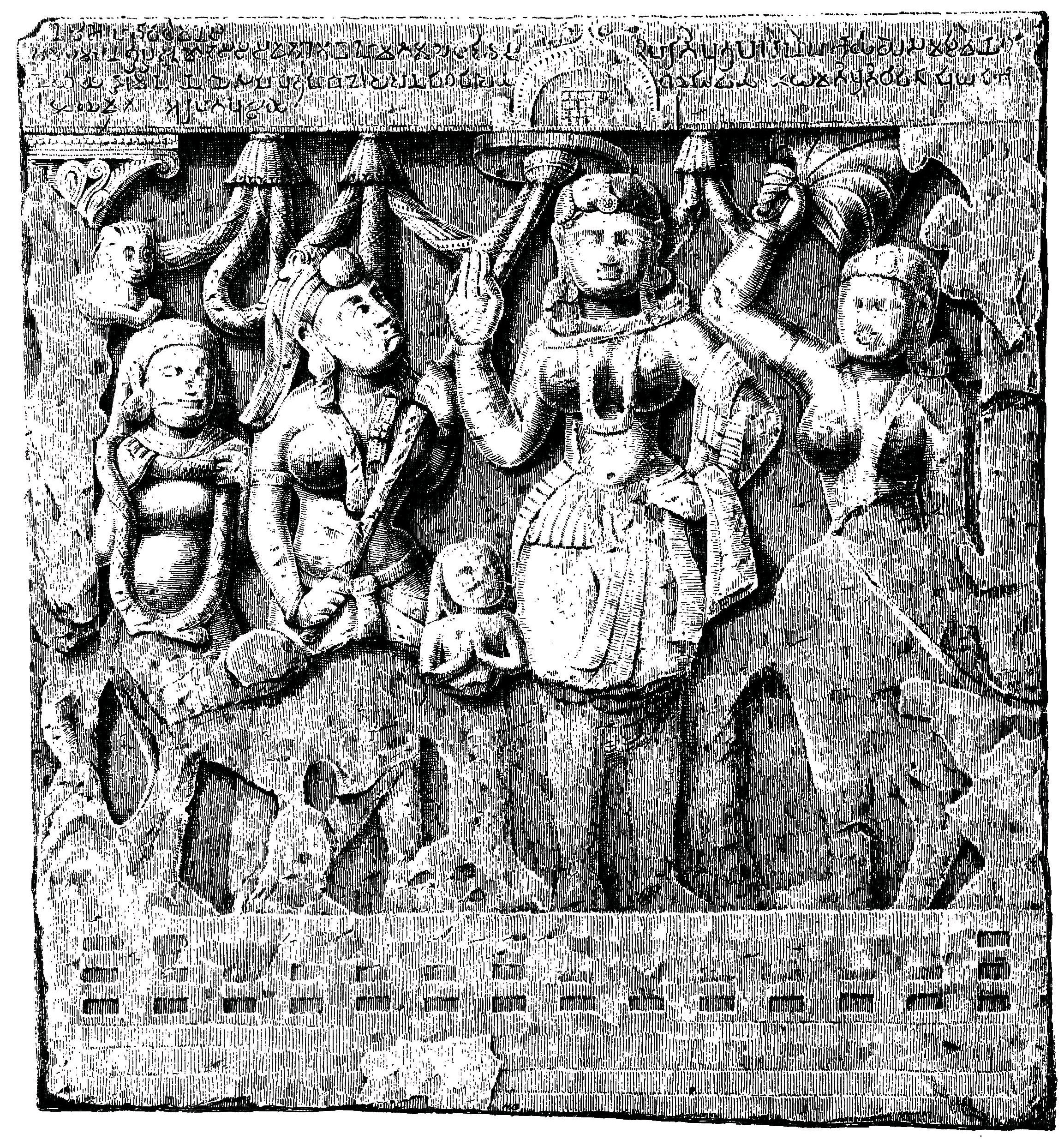
A Kankali Tila plate, with an inscription mentioning the year 42 of the reign of Northern Satraps ruler Sodasa.

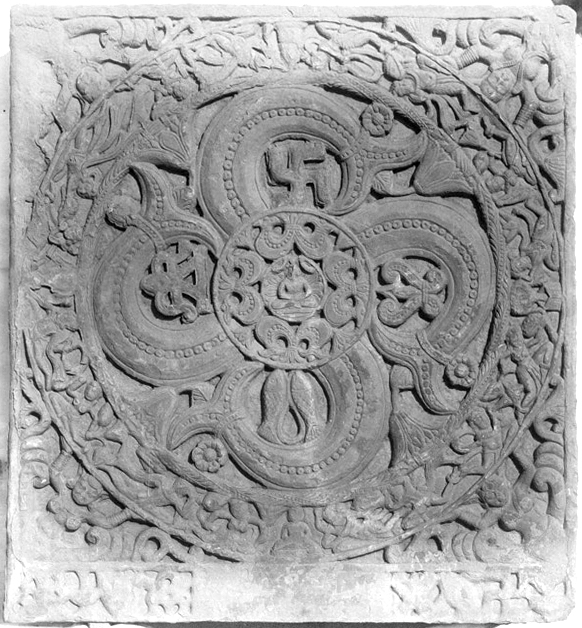
Dhanamitra Ayagapata, c. 25 CE

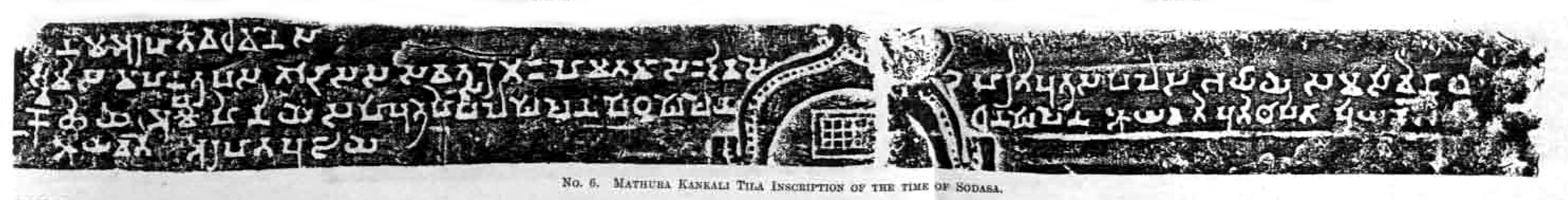
The inscription mentioned in Kankali Tila tablet of Sodasa.

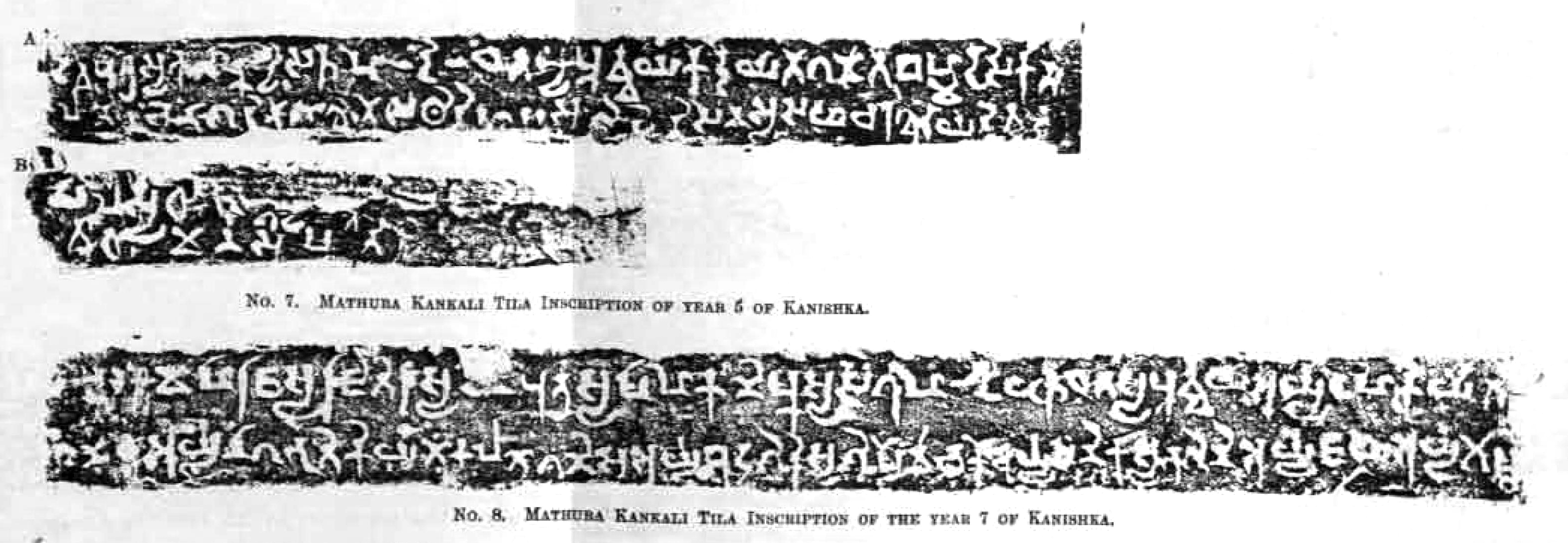
Kankali Tila inscription of Kanishka, Year 5 and 7

Kankali Tila (also Kankali mound or Jaini mound) is a mound located at Mathura in the Indian state of Uttar Pradesh. The name of the mound is derived from a modern temple of Hindu goddess Kankali. The famous Jain stupa was excavated here in 1890-91 by Alois Anton Führer (Dr. Führer).

== Images and inscriptions ==
The mound almost rectangular in shape is 500 feet long by 350 feet broad. Kankali Tila brought forth many treasures of Jain art. The archaeological findings testifies the existence of two Jain temples and stupas. Numerous Jain sculptures, Ayagapattas (tablet of homage), pillars, crossbeams and lintels were found during archaeological excavations. Some of the sculptures are provided with inscriptions that report on the contemporary society and organization of the Jain community. Most sculptures could be dated from the 2nd century BC to the 12th century CE, thus representing a continuous period of about 14 centuries during which Jainism flourished at Mathura. These sculptures are now housed in the State Museum Lucknow and in the Mathura Museum.

Images of Rishabhanatha, first tirthankara in Jainism, dating back to 100 BCE were found along with images of Nilanjana's dance in his court. Images of Neminatha, 22nd tirthankara in Jainism, is found in Kankali Tila dating back to Kushan period depicts him as a cousin of Krishna and Balarama. Headless image of Parsvanatha, 23rd tirthankara in Jainism, is dated from 100 BCE to 75 BCE.

== Excavation ==
Alexander Cunningham worked at the western end in March and November 1871. The objects found by Mr. Cunningham were all Jain, with the exception of one ten-armed Brahmanical figure. Mr. Growse operated on the northern portion in 1875. In Volume XVII of the "Reports" (page 111), Mr. Cunningham noted that in the season of 1881-82 he dug up many Jain figures, including one inscribed with the name of Vardhamana, the last of the 24 Jain Tirthankara.

Dr. Burgess and Dr. Fuhrer extended the excavations to the eastern end at different times from 1887 to 1896. Mr. Harding, a predecessor of Mr. Growse as Magistrate of Mathura, also made some excavations. The excavations at Kankali Tila acted as a testimony to the claims made by Jains regarding the great antiquity of their religion.

== Significance ==
The sculptures and the inscriptions found at Kankali Tila suggest that in that period a clear Digambar-Shwetabar division had not risen. The Tirthankar images are all unclothed and monks are represented as not wearing a loincloth, but with cloth on one forearm as described in ancient Śvetāmbara texts such as the Ācārāṅga Sūtra and the Kalpa Sūtra. The names of divisions of the monastic orders in inscriptions found at the Kankali Tila match exactly with those given in the ancient Śvetāmbara text Kalpasutra.

== Gallery ==
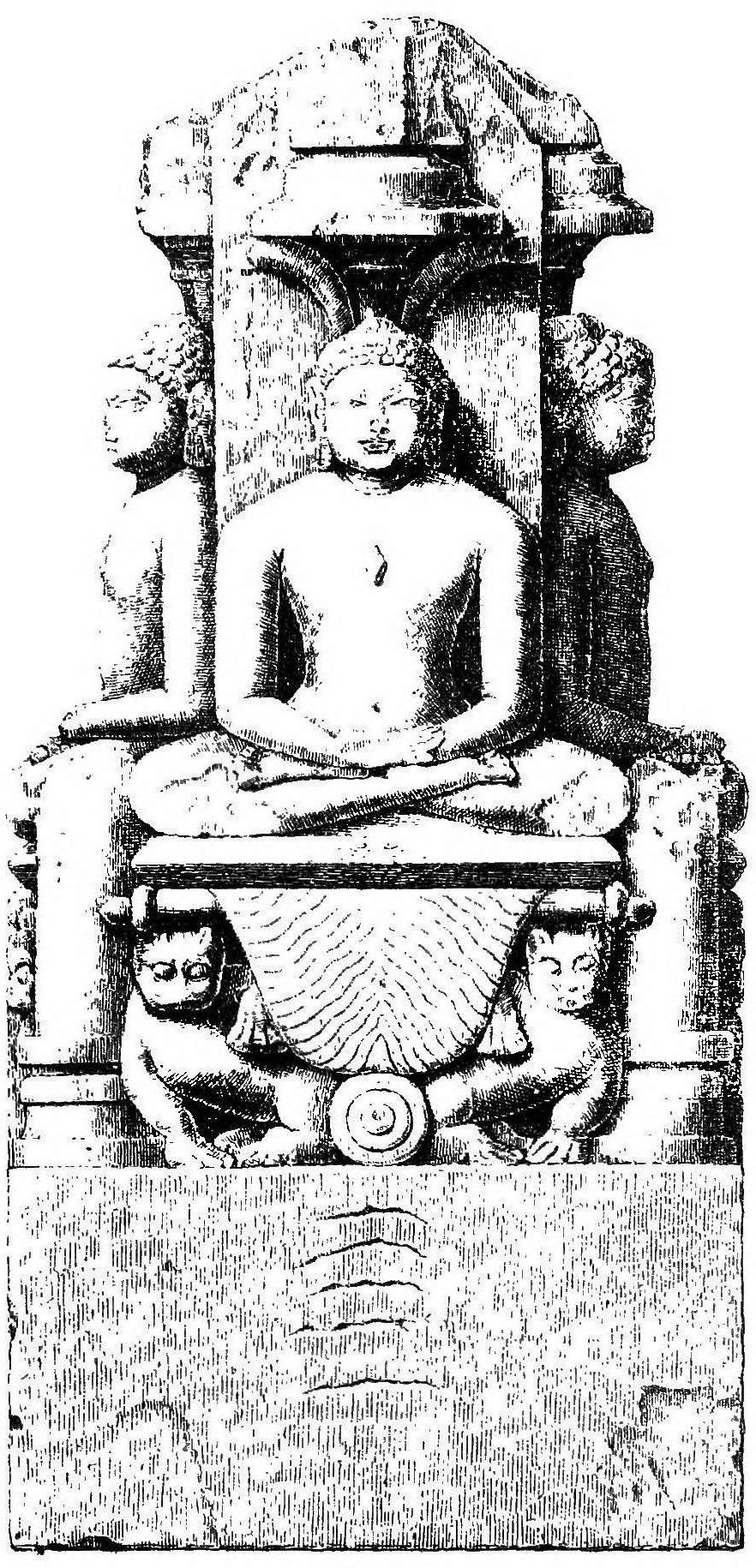
A quadruple Jain Image

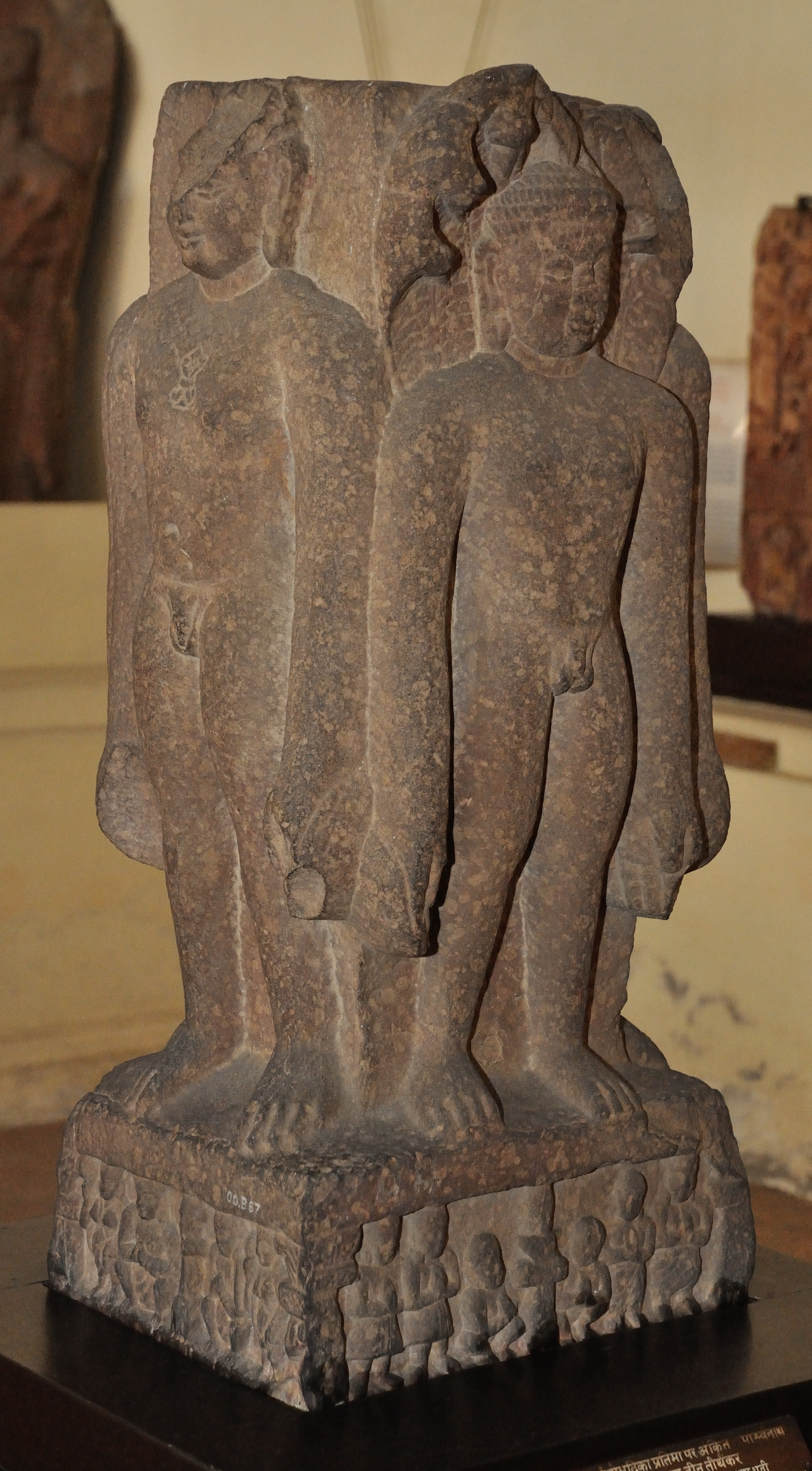
Quadruple Jain Image, excavated from Kankali Tila, c. 1st century CE

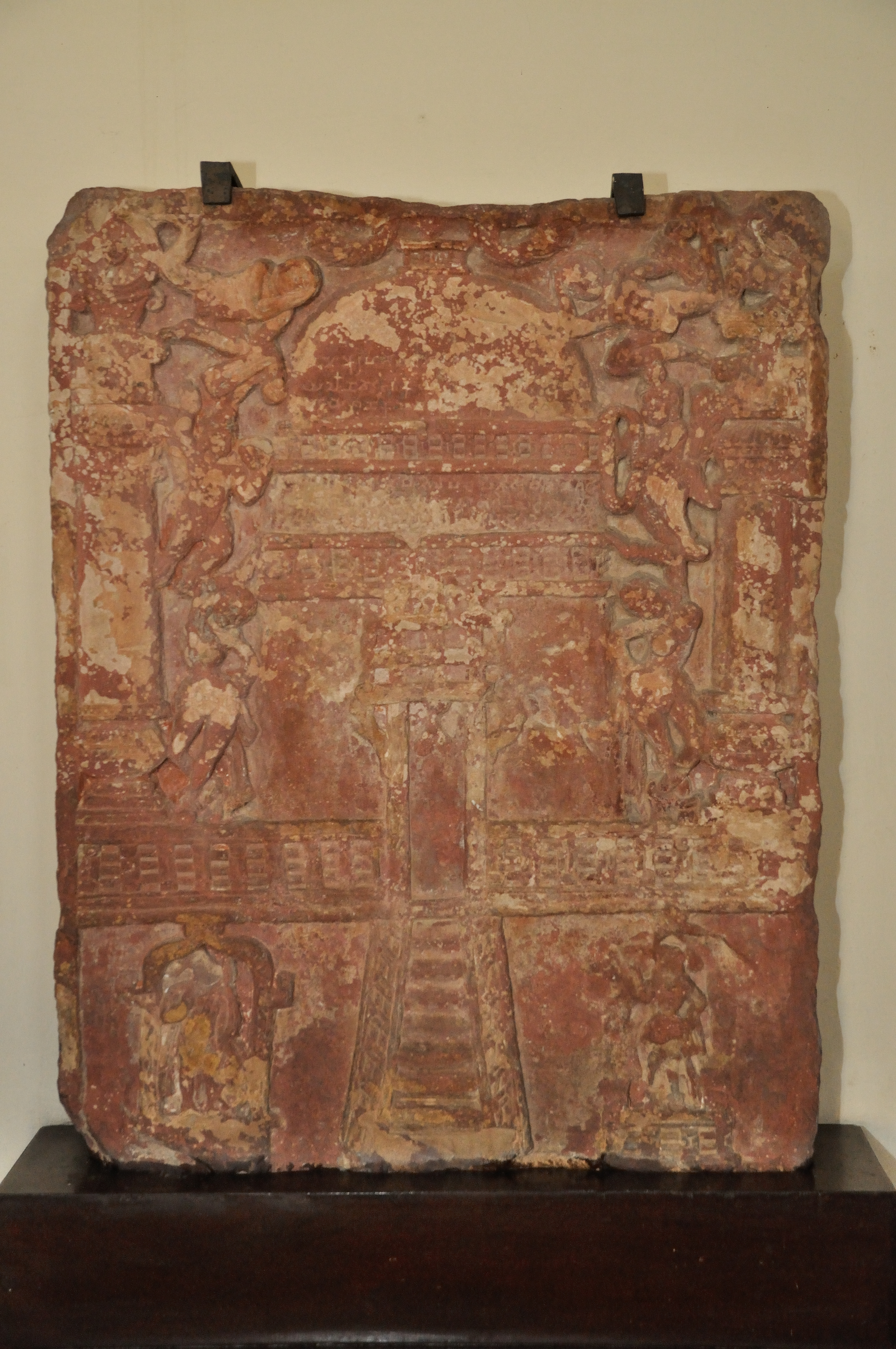
Vasu Śilāpaṭa, Jain Tablet Homage Set-up by Vasu the daughter of Courtesan Lavana Sobhika - Circa 1st Century CE - Kankali Mound (ACCN 00-Q-7 - Government Museum, Mathura)

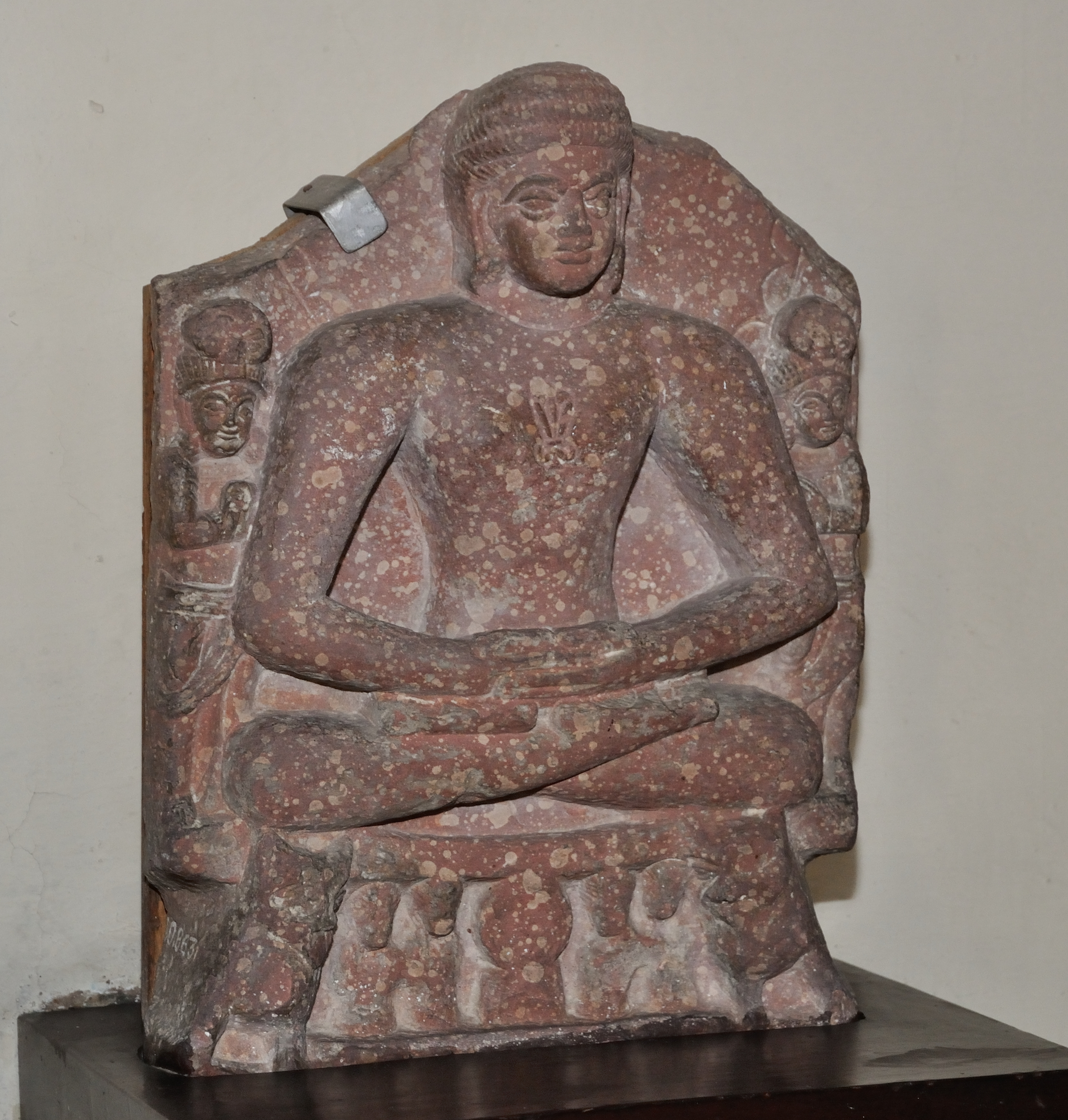
Jina in meditation, Kushan art

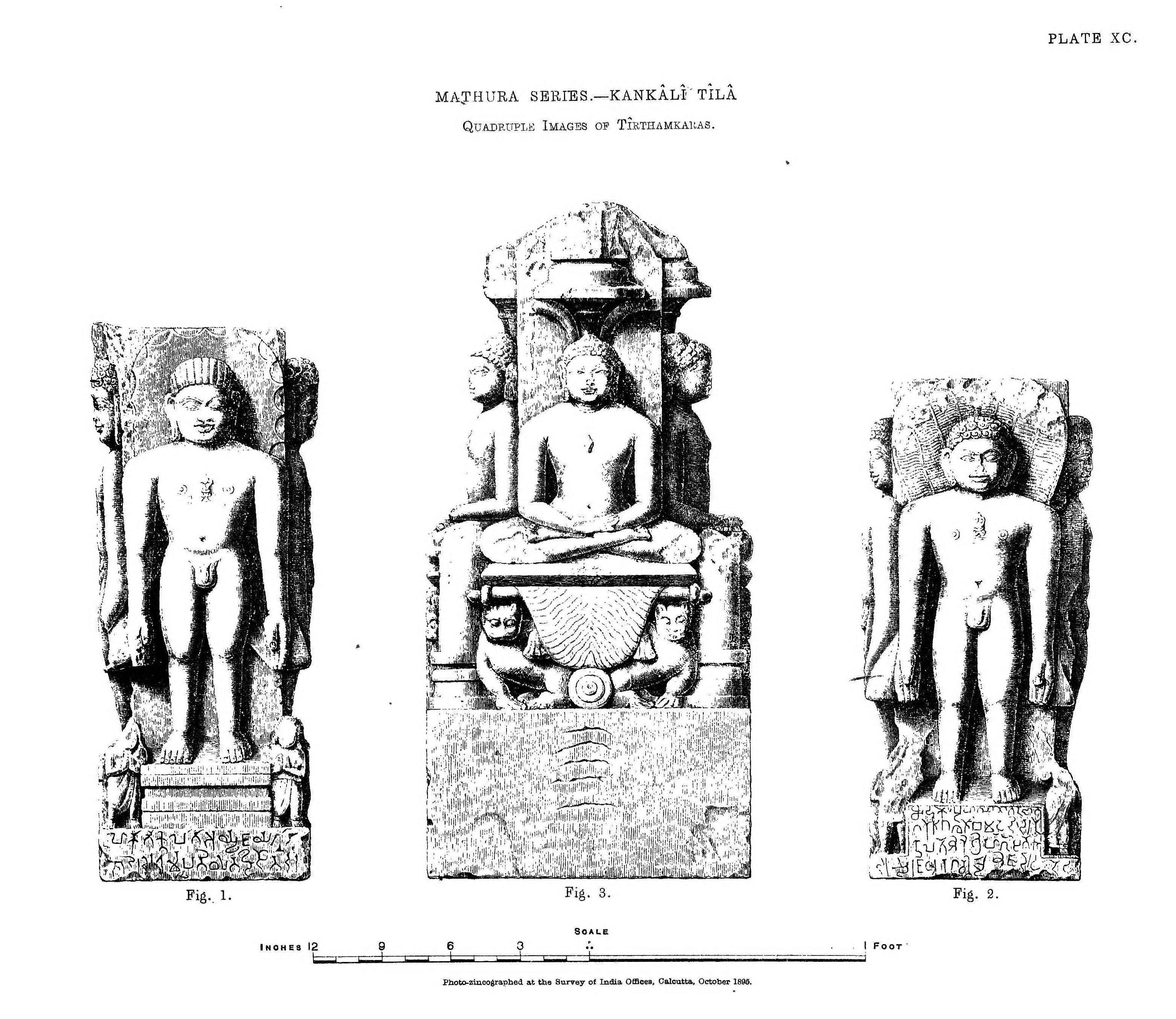
Three Quadruple images of Tirthankar excavated from Kankali Tila, c. 42 BCE(V.S. 15)

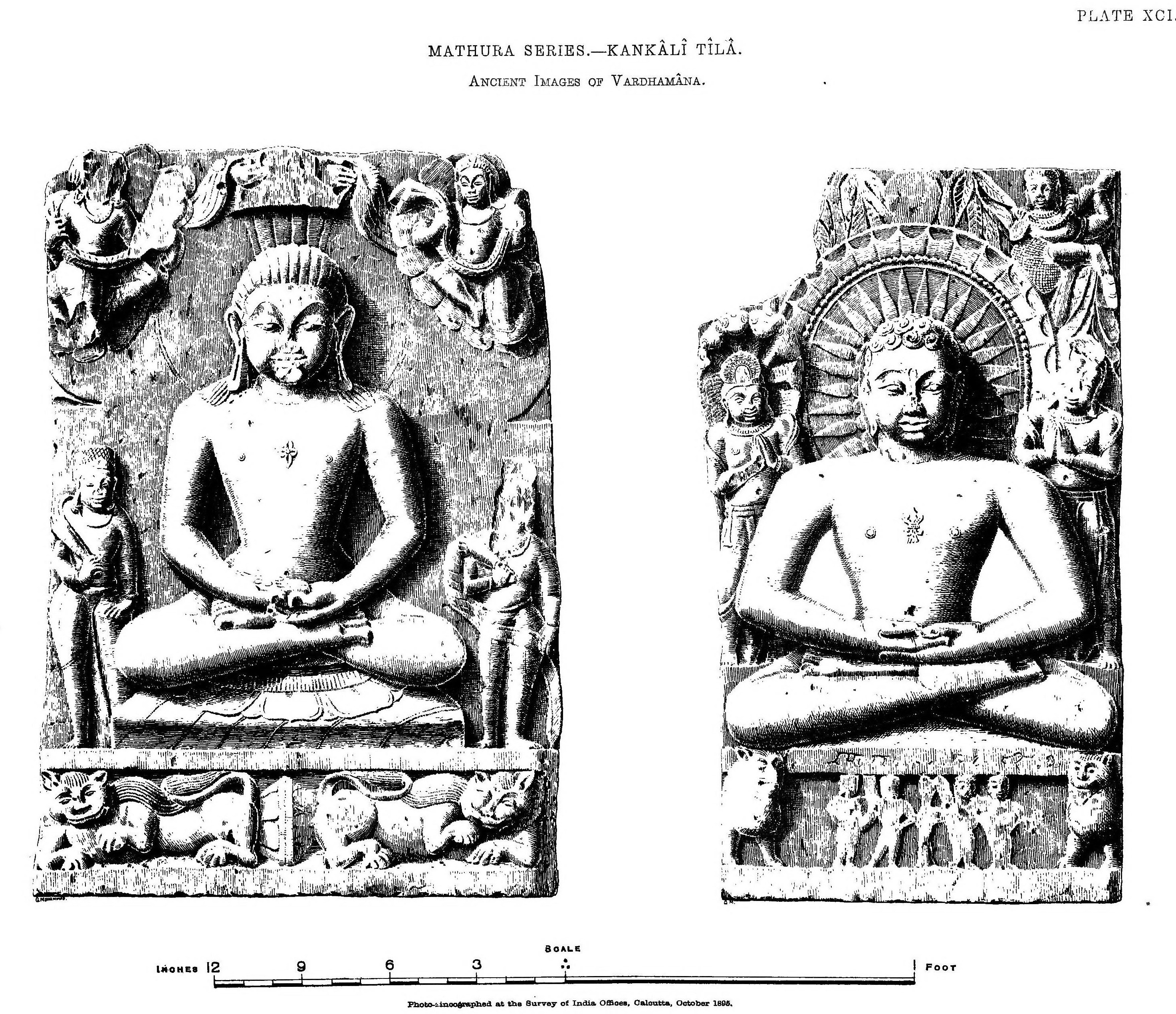
Images of Tirthankar Mahavira excavated from Kankali Tila

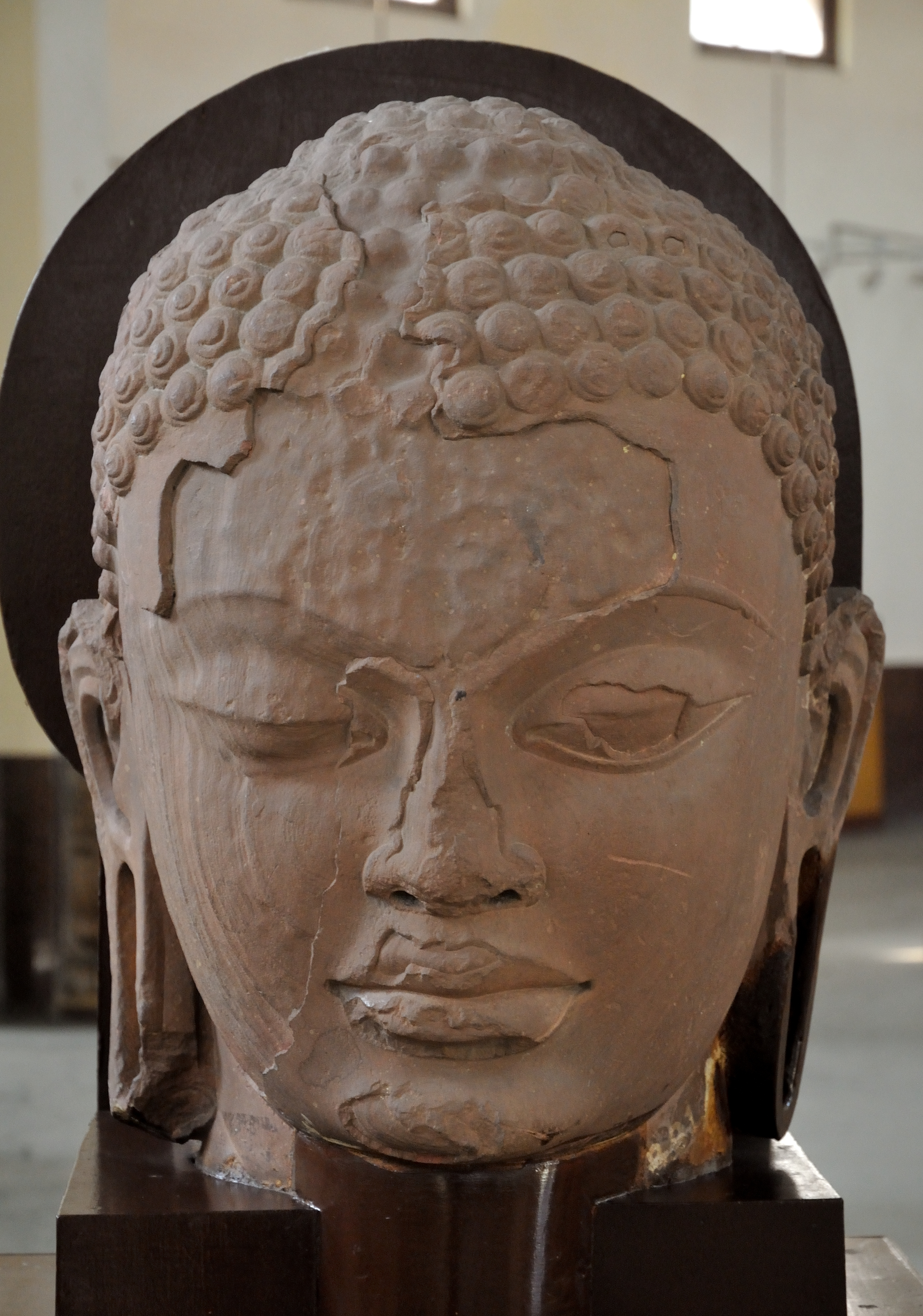
Colossal Head of Jineshvara (Gupta Period)

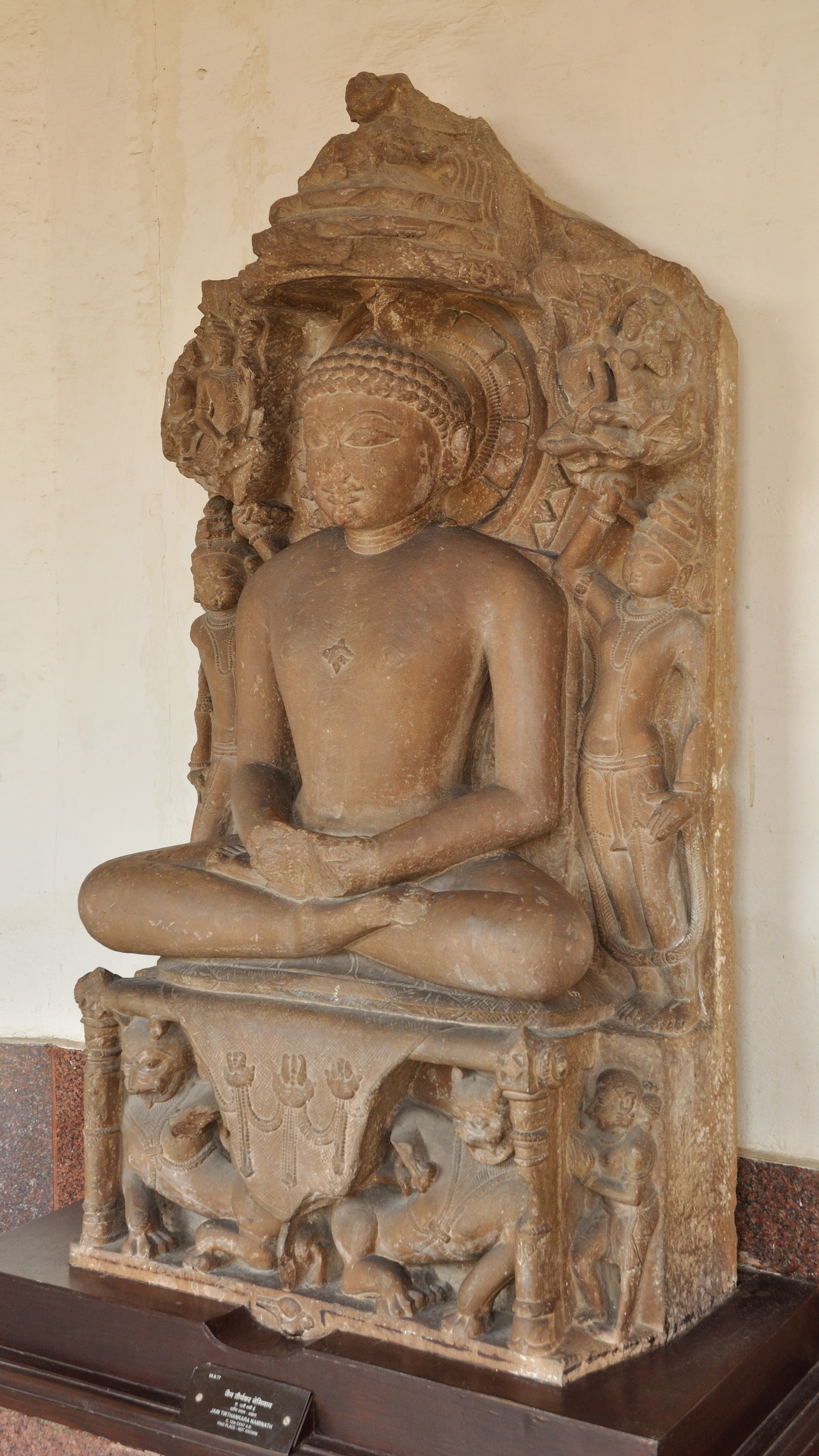
Jain Tirthankara Lord Naminatha - (Circa 12th Century CE) ACCN 00-B-77. Government Museum Mathura

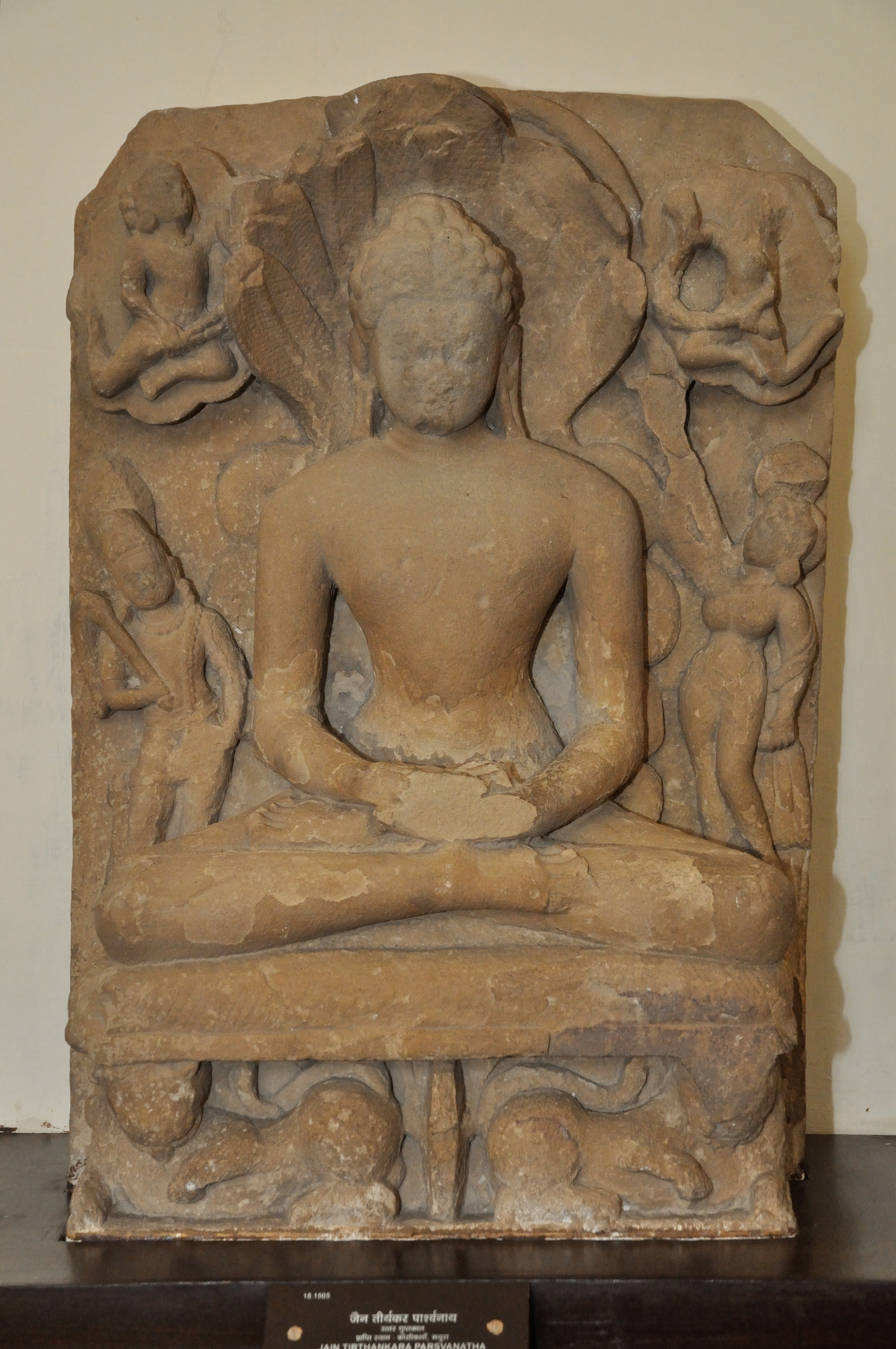
Tirthankara Lord Parsvanatha (Post Gupta Period) - Kosi Kalan ACCN 18-1505 Government Museum Mathura

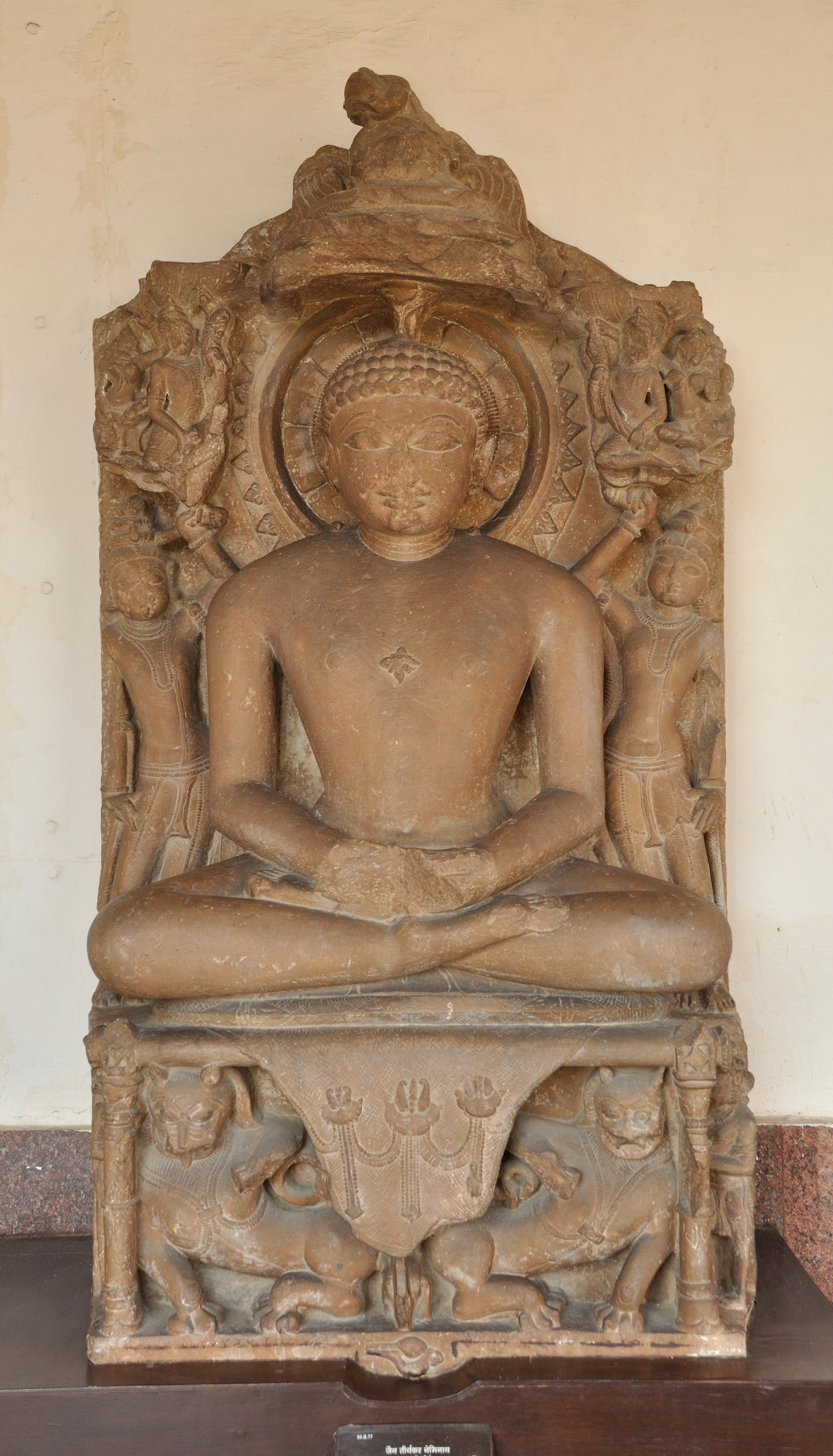
Tirthankara Lord Neminatha (Circa 12th Century CE) ACCN 00-B-77 Government Museum Mathura

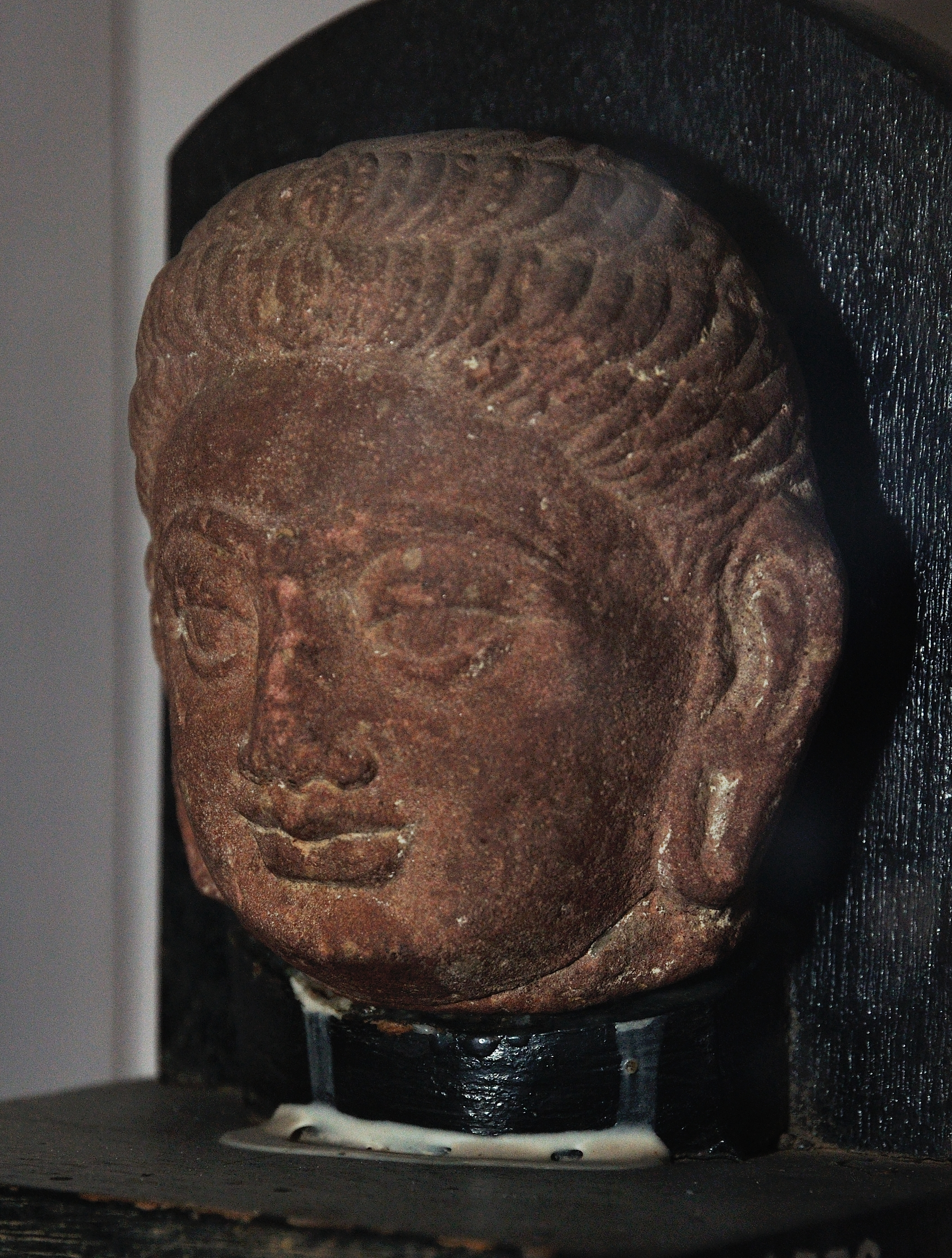

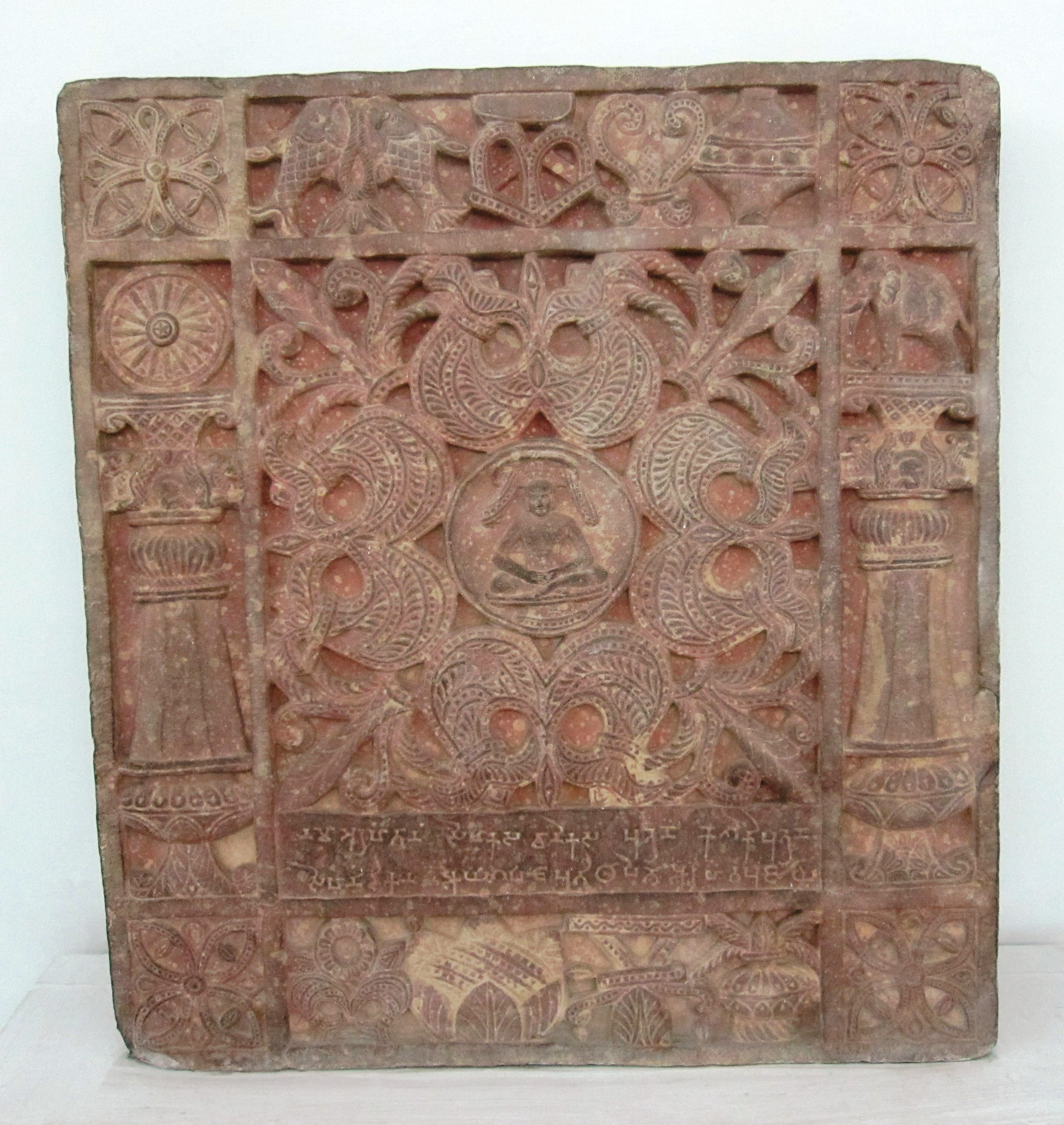
Jain votive plaque (c. 200 CE)

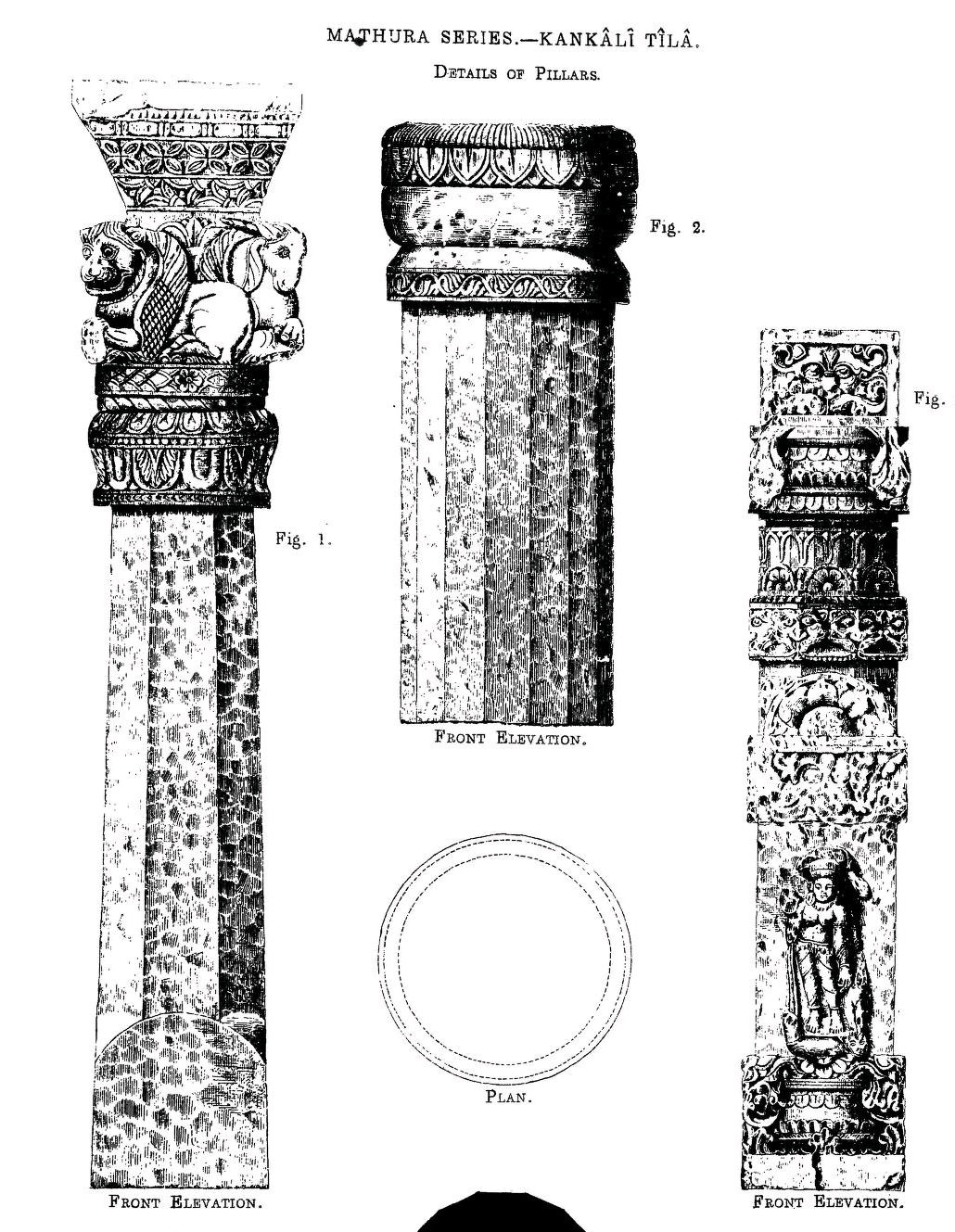
Pillars

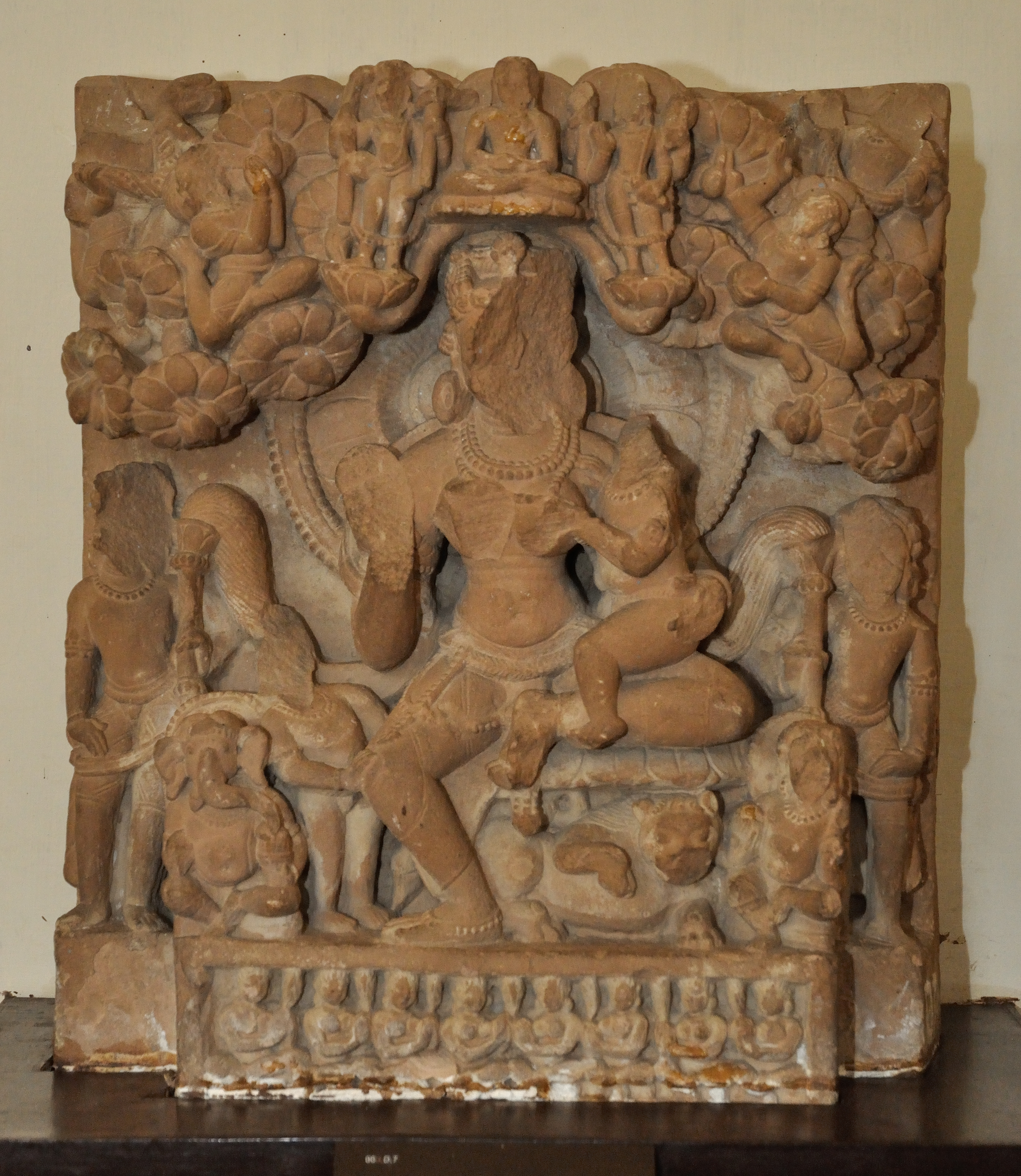
Jain Yakshini Ambika (Mediaeval Period) Government Museum Mathura

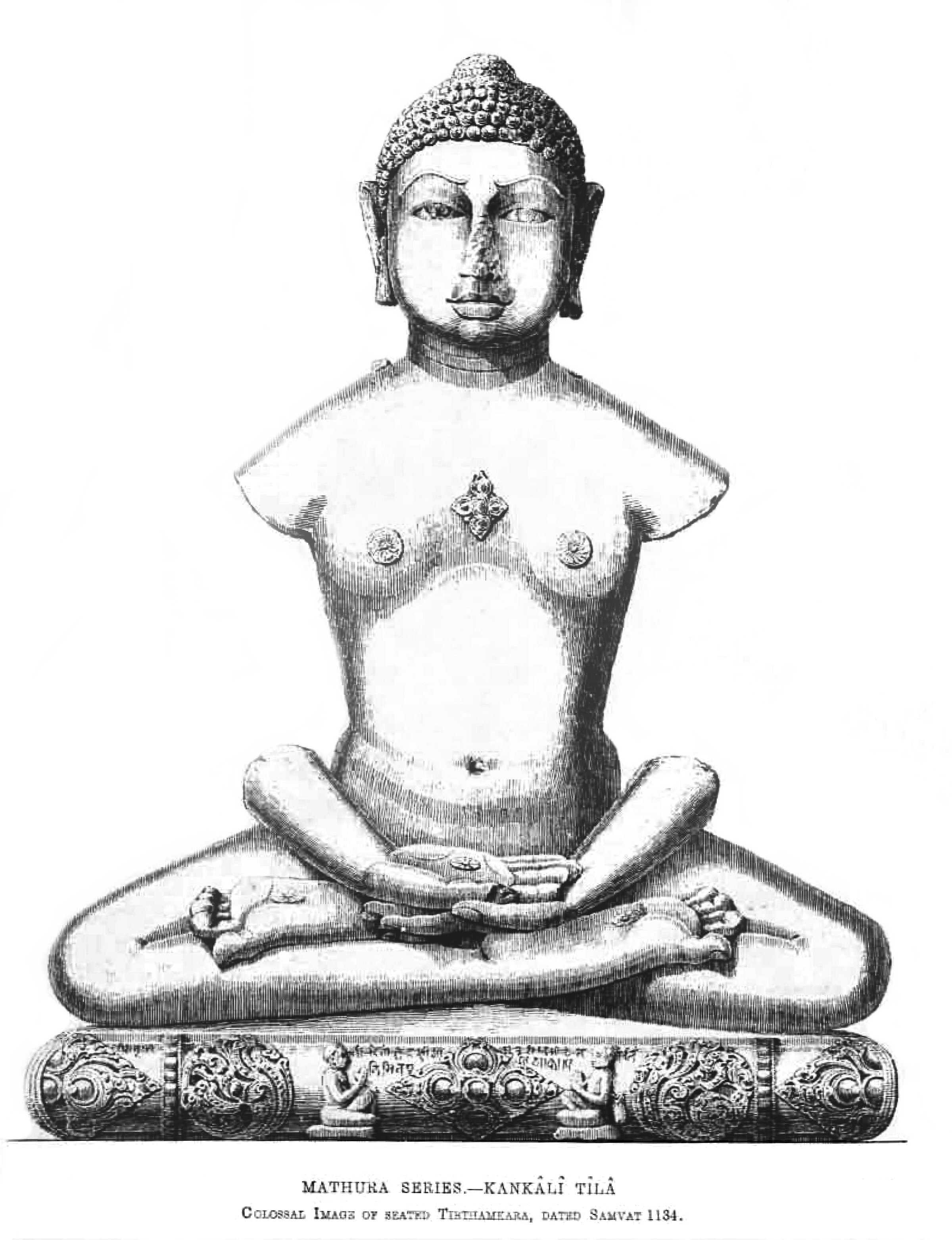
Jain statue inscribed Samvat 1134 (1077 CE), about 60 years after the sack of Mathura by Mahmud of Ghazni. Kankali Tila, Mathura.

== See also ==
- List of Monuments of National Importance in Agra circle
- Chausa hoard
