= Ayagapata =

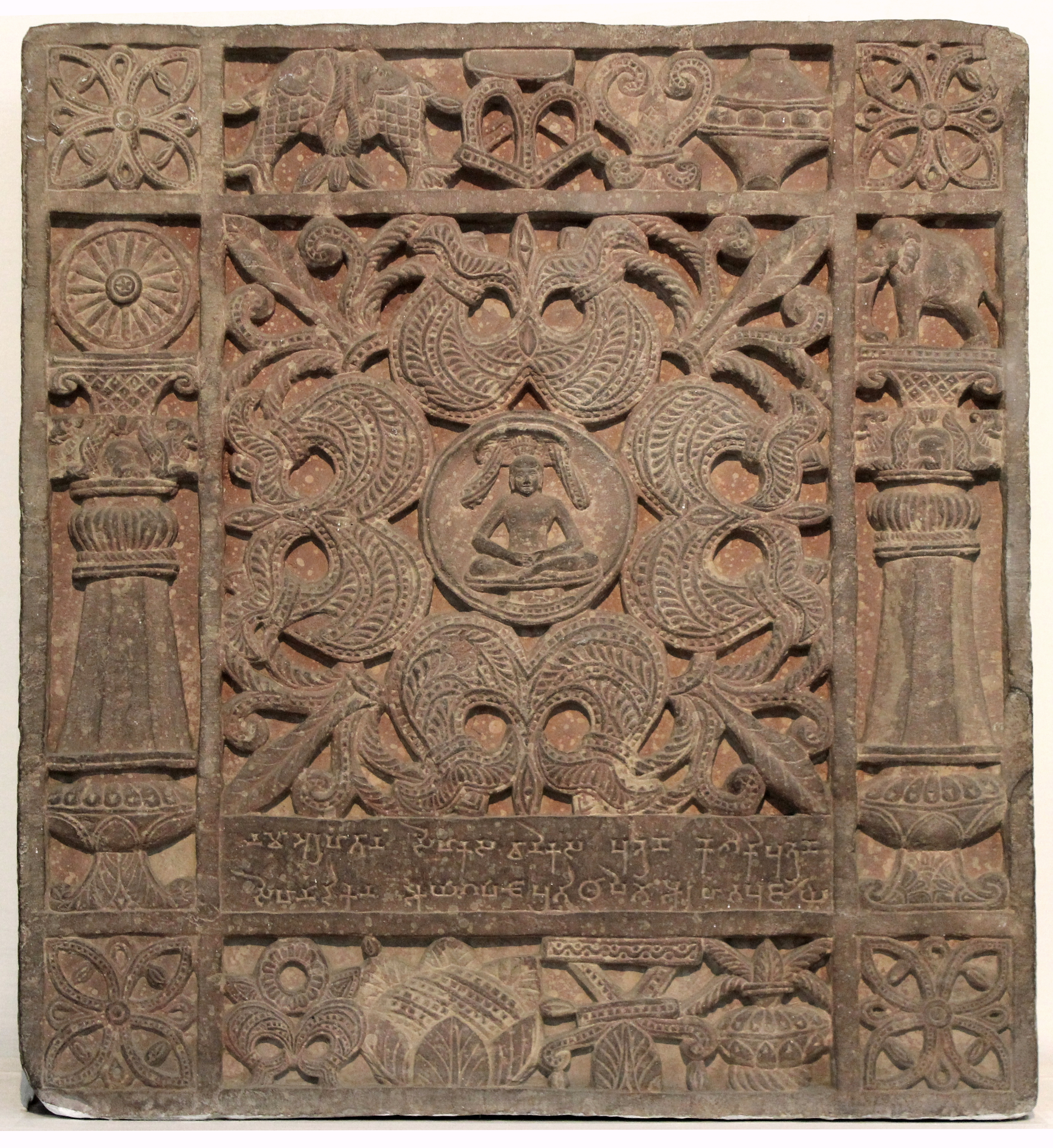
Ayagapata, excavated from Kankali Tila, circa 25-50 CE

Ayagapata (Hindi:अयागपट्ट) or Ayagapatta is a type of votive slab associated with worship in Jainism.

== Background ==
Numerous such stone tablets discovered during excavations at ancient Jain sites like Kankali Tila near Mathura in India. Some of them date back to 1st century C.E. These slabs are decorated with objects and designs central to Jain worship such as the stupa, dharmacakra and triratna.

A large number of ayagapata (tablet of homage), votive tablets for offerings and the worship of tirthankara, were found at Mathura.

== Description ==
These stone tablets bear a resemblance to the earlier Shilapatas - stone tablets that were placed under trees to worship Yakshas. However, this was done by indigenous folk communities before Jainism originated suggesting that both have commonalities in rituals. A scholar on Jain art wrote about an Ayagapata discovered around Kankali Tila, "The technical name of such a tablet was Ayagapata meaning homage panel." Kankali Tila tablet of Sodasa and Parsvanatha ayagapata are one of the important Ayagapata. Tablet of Sodasa is an adoration to Mahavira dating back to c. 42 CE and Parsvanatha ayagapata is an adoration to Parsvanatha dating back to c. 15 CE.

== Gallery ==
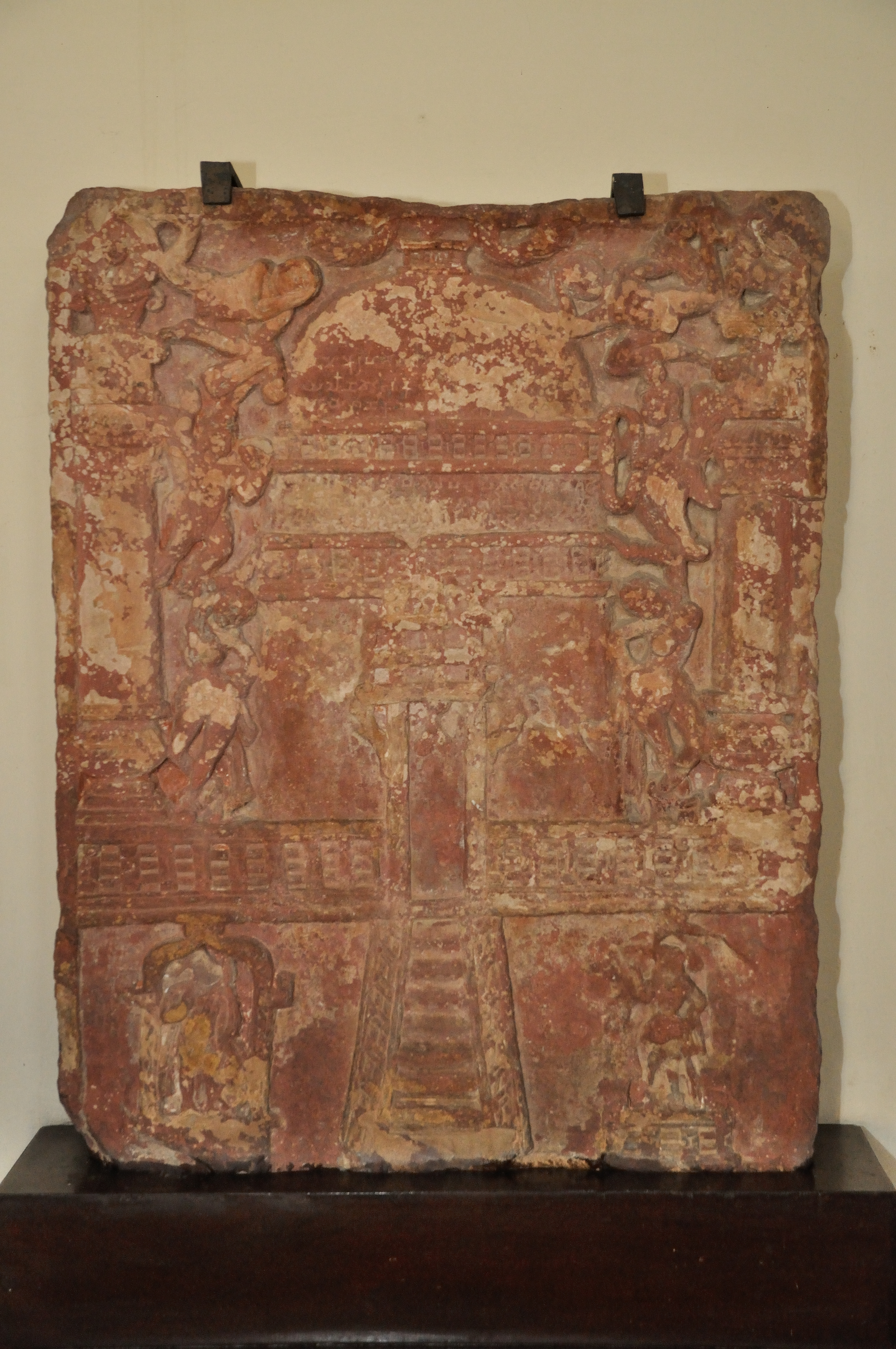
Vasu Śilāpaṭa, Jain Tablet of homage showing a Jain stupa (Circa 1st Century CE) (Photo:Government Museum, Mathura)

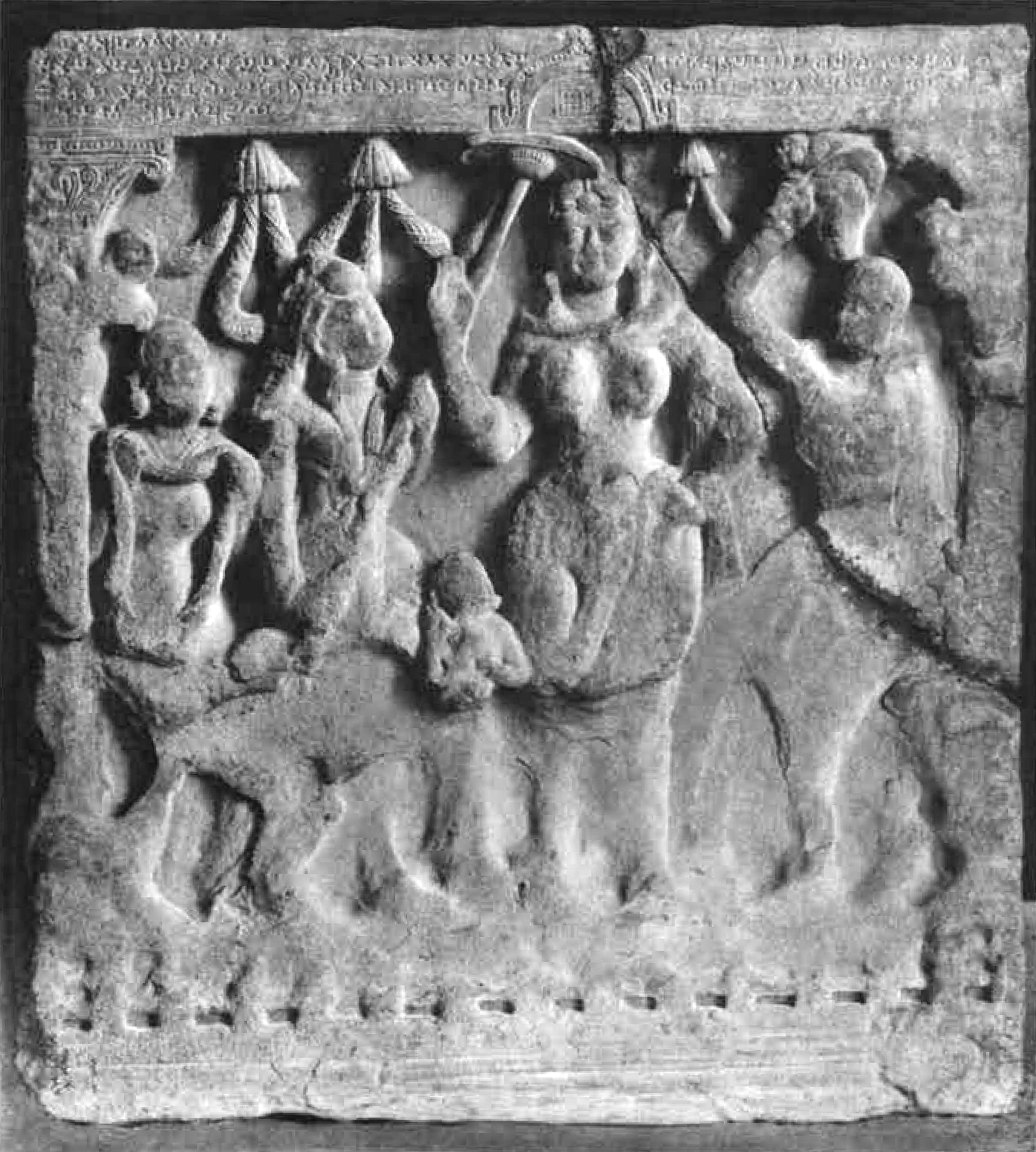
A Kankali Tila plate, with an inscription mentioning the year 42 of the reign of Northern Satraps ruler Sodasa

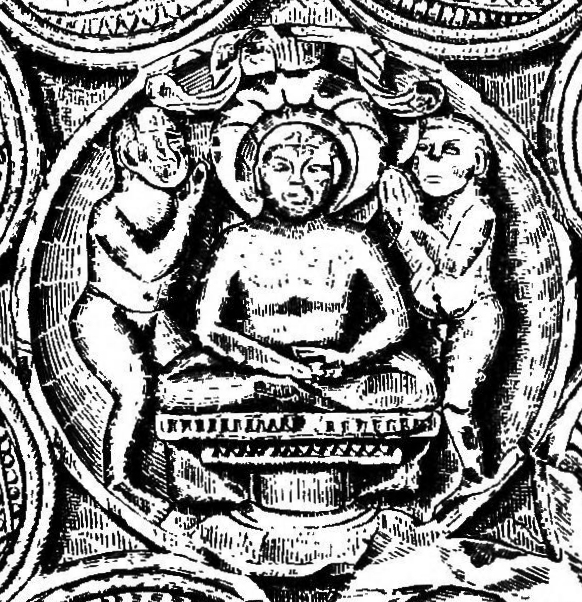
The Jina Parsvanatha (detail of Parsvanatha ayagapata), Mathura circa 15 CE, Lucknow Museum.

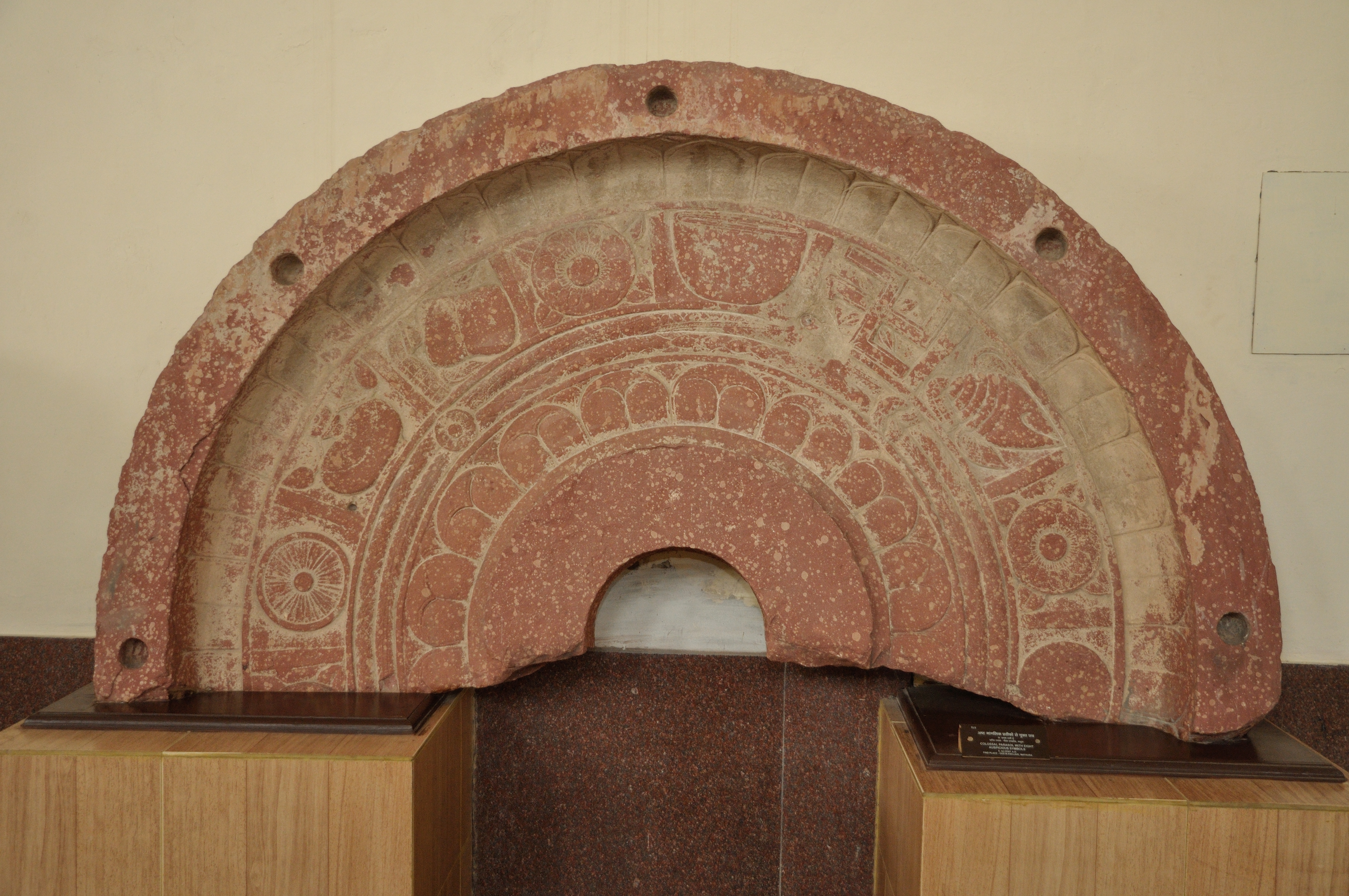
Jain Ashtamangala, 1st century

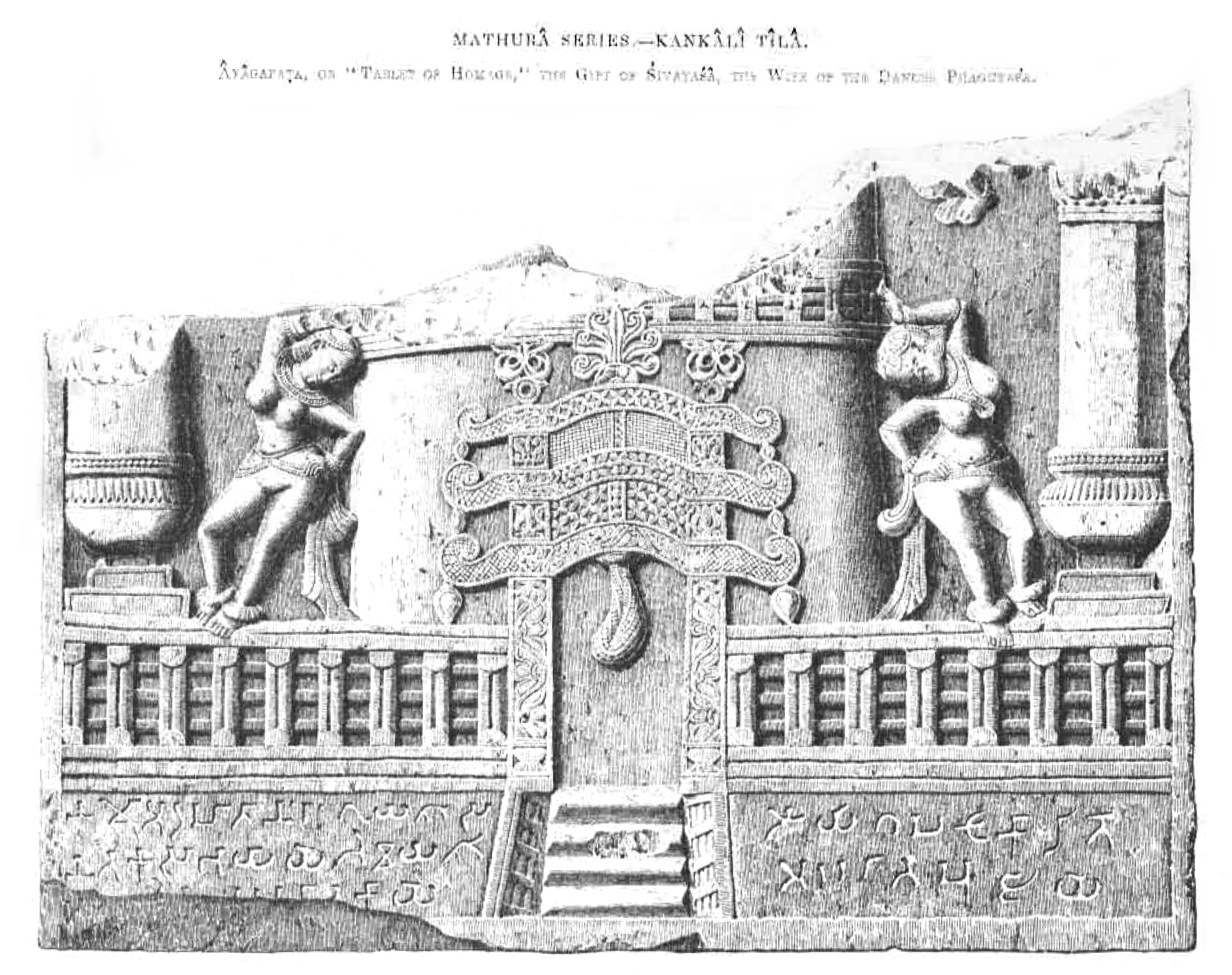
Sivayasa Ayagapata, Kankali Tila

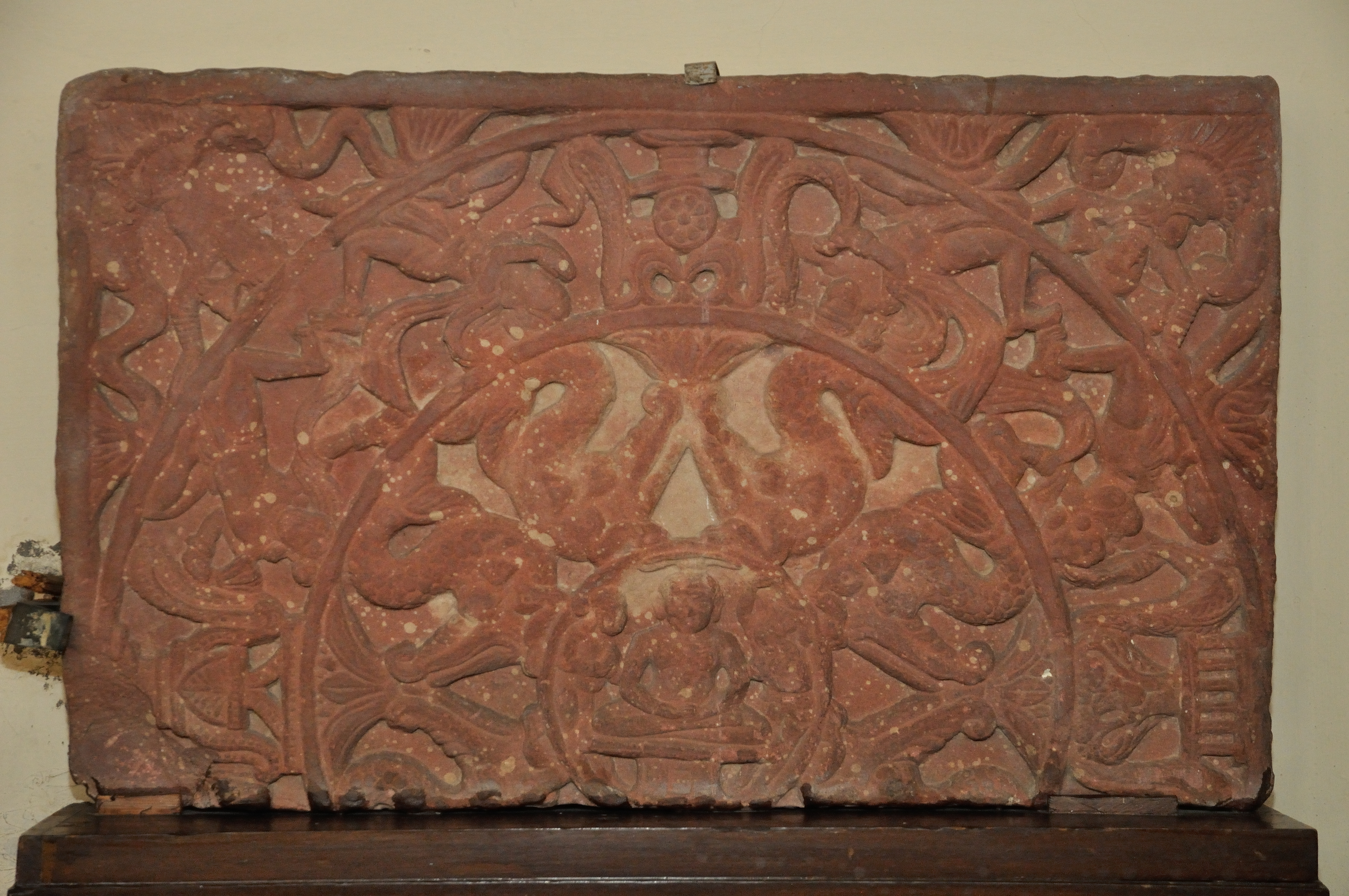
Upper Half of Ayagapatta with Miniature Tirthankara and other sacred symbols, circa 1st Century CE

== See also ==
- Jain art
- Kankali Tila
- Mathura museum
