= Parsvanatha ayagapata =

Jain ayagapata from Kankali Tila near Mathura

Pārśvanātha Āyāgapaṭa
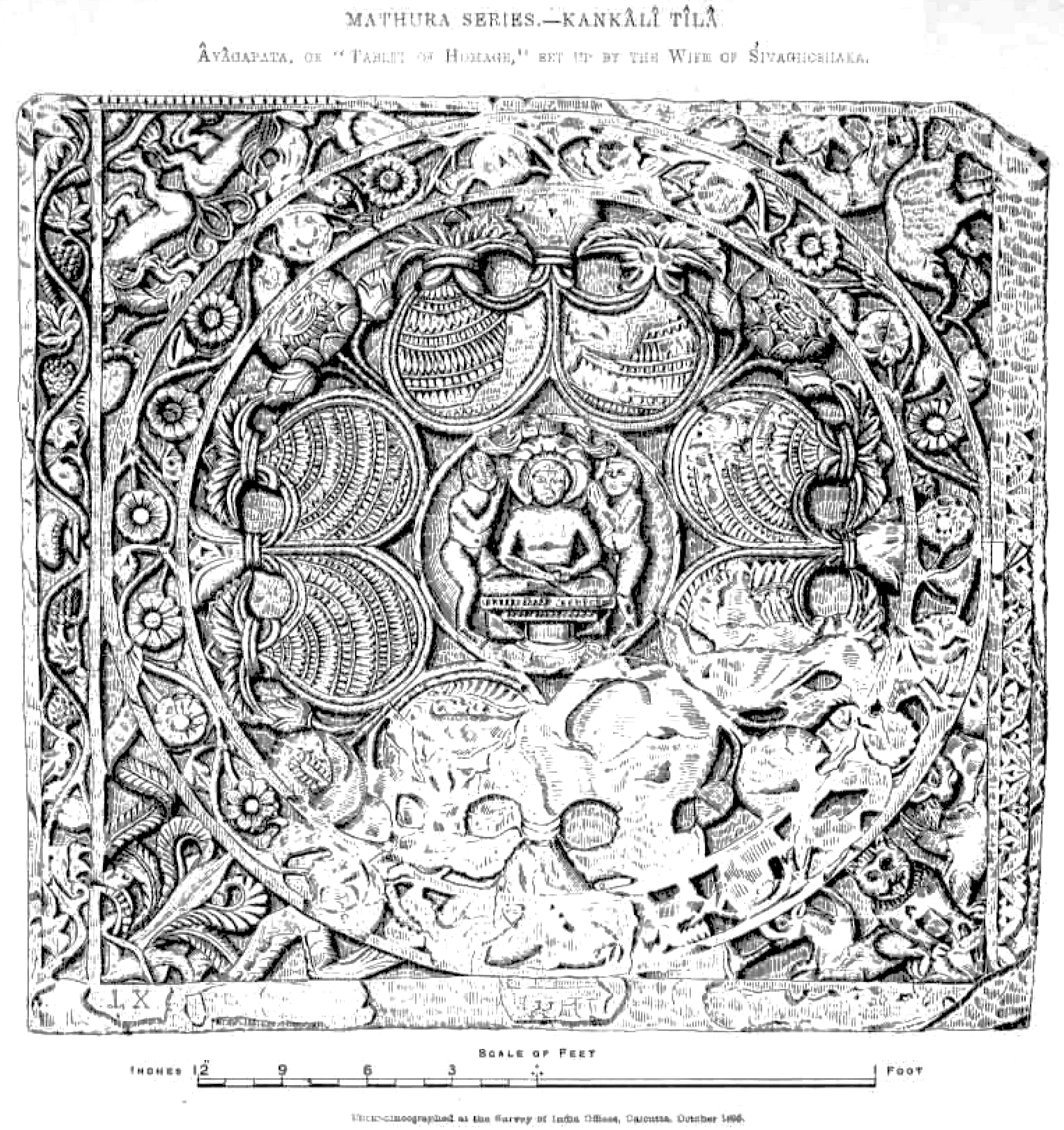
- Pārśvanātha āyāgapaṭa, a tablet of homage to Parshvanatha, the 23th Tirthankara of Jainism
- Type: Ayagapata
- Material: Red sandstone
- Size: 86 by 94 centimetres (34 by 37 in)
- Created: circa 15 CE
- Period/culture: Northern Satraps
- Discovered: January 1891; 27°36′00″N 77°39′00″E
- Place: Kankali Tila, Mathura, India.
- Present location: State Museum Lucknow
- Classification: Jain art

Location

The Pārśvanātha āyāgapaṭa, is a large stone slab discovered in Kankali (area of Mathura) which has an image of Parshvanatha, dating back to reign Sodasa, of Indo-Scythian Northern Satrap, the ruler Sodasa in Mathura. The tablet in the State Museum Lucknow (room J.253). It is an important example of Mathura art.

== Description ==
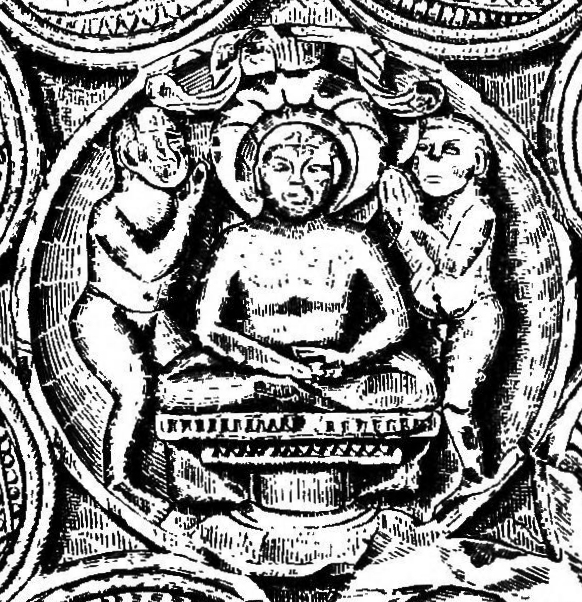
Image of Parshvanatha flanked by two monks in the centre of ayagapata

This votive tablet, which is essentially an ayagapata, though not so called, represents an image of Parshvanatha in the center surrounded by a bunches of lotus. Parshvanatha is depicted in lotus position seated on a pedestal with a seven-hooded sesha hood above his head. The iconography flanked by two ardhaphalaka monks with colapatta draped over left arms, with their hands in añjali mudrā. Similar to Dhanamitra ayagapata, Parshvanatha is in dhyāna mudrā with ankle crossed in padmasana position and shrivatsa on the chest. The moulding of sawtooth design below the pedestal on which Jina is seated is considered to be a version of Mount Meru type of pedestal, which underscores Jina seated on the axis of the world.

Surrounding the central circle in a larger concentric ring with four nandavarta, between each interstice of nandavarta is a half-opened lotus flanked by two smaller buds. In four spandrels there are carvings of different motifs namely an elephant frolicking with lotuses, a seated lion, honeysuckle, and rearing gryphons with lotus in their mouth. There is a carving of a grapevine growing out of a pot at the median on the left border.

== Inscription ==
The inscription at the base is much mutilated. The characters are of an archaic type before the Kushan era. What is left of the record reads as follows:

Namo arahaňtânâ Sivagho[shaka] sa bhari[yá] ... nâ ... nâ

"Adoration to the Arhats! .... the wife of Sivaghoshaka ...."

— Inscription of the Parsvanatha ayagapata (Translation by Alois Anton Führer)

== Date ==
The Parsvanatha ayagapata was originally dated back to 1st century BCE by Bühler. However, was later identified by Quintanilla to be datable to c. 15 CE during the reign Sodasa, of Indo-Scythian Northern Satrap, the ruler Sodasa in Mathura.

== See also ==
- Vasu Śilāpaṭa
- Kankali Tila tablet of Sodasa
- Jain stupa
- Lohanipur torso
