= Kankali Tila tablet of Sodasa =

Large stone slab discovered in Kankali

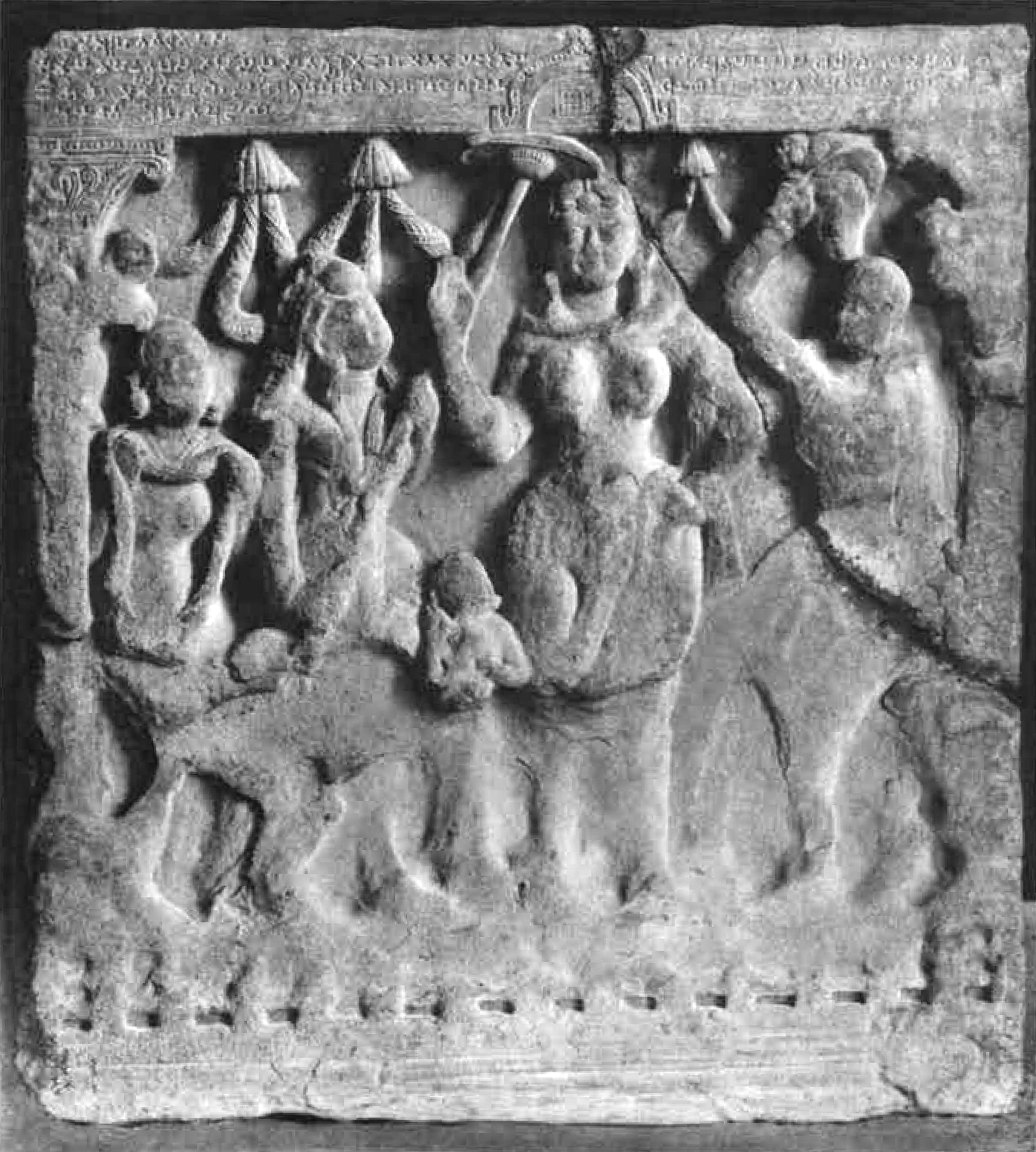
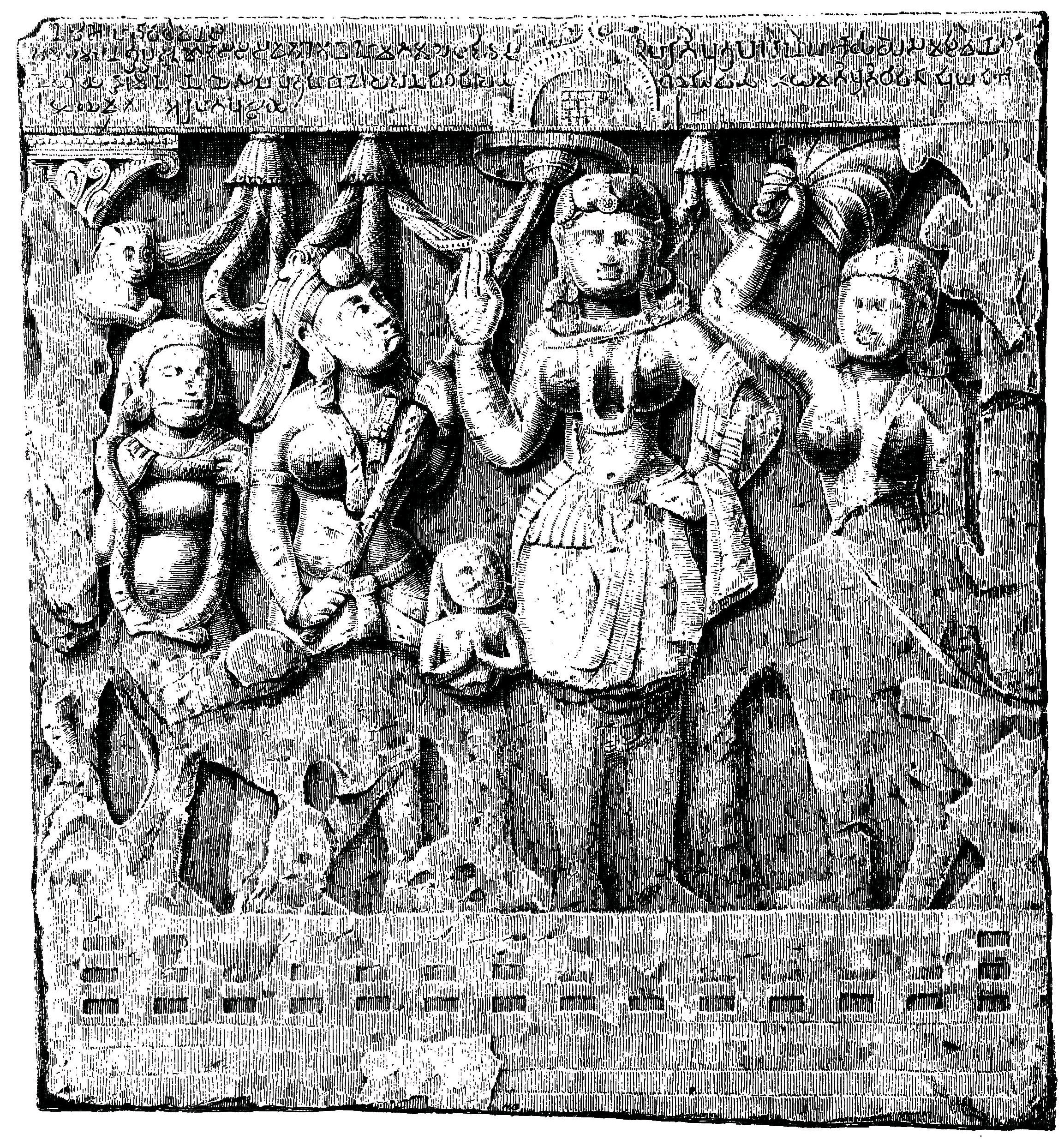
- The Kankali Tila tablet of Sodasa (photograph and drawing), with an inscription mentioning the year 42 of the reign of Northern Satraps ruler Sodasa.
- Material: Red sandstone
- Period/culture: 1st century CE
- Discovered: 27°36′00″N 77°39′00″E
- Place: Kankali Tila, Mathura, India.
- Present location: State Museum Lucknow

Location

The Kankali Tila tablet of Sodasa, also called the Iryavati stone tablet, or Amohini ayagapata, is a large stone slab discovered in Kankali (area of Mathura) which mentions the rule of the Northern Satraps ruler Sodasa in Mathura. The tablet in the State Museum Lucknow (room J.1). It is an important example of Mathura art.

== Description ==
This votive tablet, which is essentially an ayagapata, though not so called, represents a royal lady attended by three women and a child. The attendant women, in accordance with the ancient Indian fashion, are naked to the waist. One holds an umbrella over her mistress, whom another fans. The third holds a wreath ready for presentation. The execution is bold, and quite artistic.

== Inscription ==
The tablet bears a three line epigraph mentioning that in the year 42 of "the Lord, the Great Satrap Sodasa" ( Svamisa Mahakṣatrapasa Śodasa) a monument for worship was set up by a certain Amohini. The text is as follows :

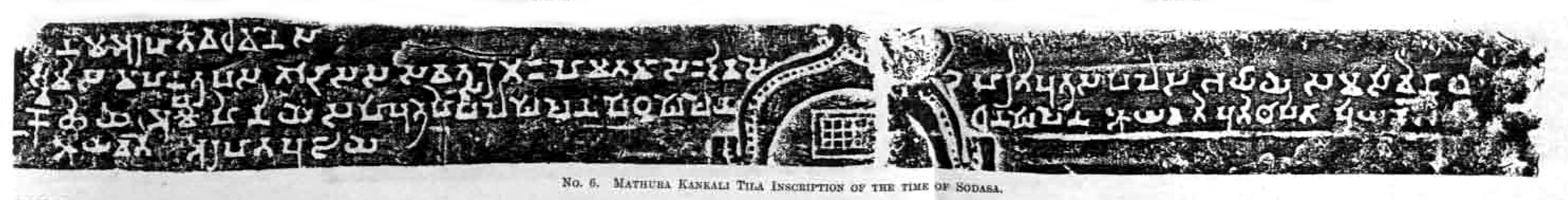

L1. Nama arahato Vardhamanasa
2. Sv[a]misa mahakshatrapasa Sodasasa savatsare XL(?)II hemantamase II divase IX Haritiputrasa Palasa bhayaye samasavikaye
3. Kochhiye Amohiniye saha putrehi Palaghoshena Pothaghoshena Dhanaghoshena Ayavati pratihapita praya[bha]
4. Aryavati arahatapujaye.

"Adoration to the Arhat Vardhamana! In the year 42 of the Lord, the Mahakshatrapa Sodasa, in the second month of winter, on the 9th day, an Ayavati (Aryavati) was set up by Amohini (Amohint), the Kochhi (Kautsi), a female lay-disciple of the ascetics (and) wife of Pala, son of a Hariti (Hariti or Hariti mother), together with her sons Palaghosha, Pothaghosha and Dhanaghosha .... the Aryavati (is) for the worship of the Arhat."

— Inscription of the Kankali Tila tablet of Sodasa (Translation by Buhler)

== Question of the date ==
The inscription shows that the tablet was presented to the Jain shrine by a lady named Amohini in the year 42 or 72, in the reign of the Great Satrap Sodasa. The first numerals for the date may be read as 40, or possibly 70 (according to Buhler), so that the regnal date could be either 42 or 72 (with 72 being favoured by most).

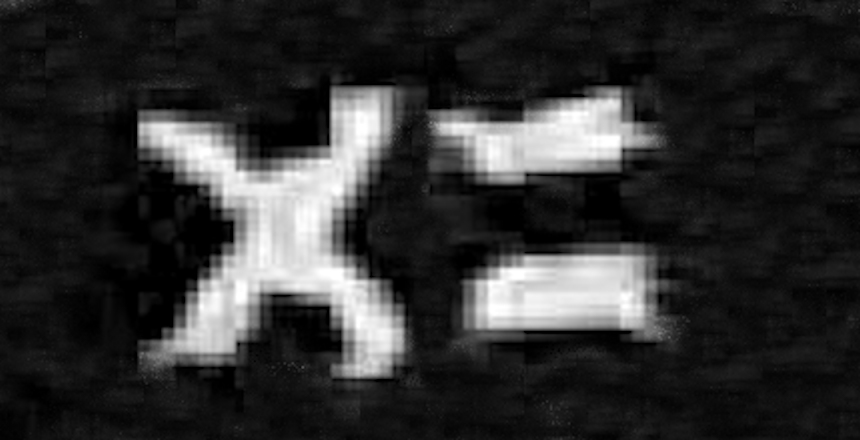
The date in Brahmi numerals appears clearly (𑁞𑁓, 40+2), but interpretations diverge between 42 and 72.

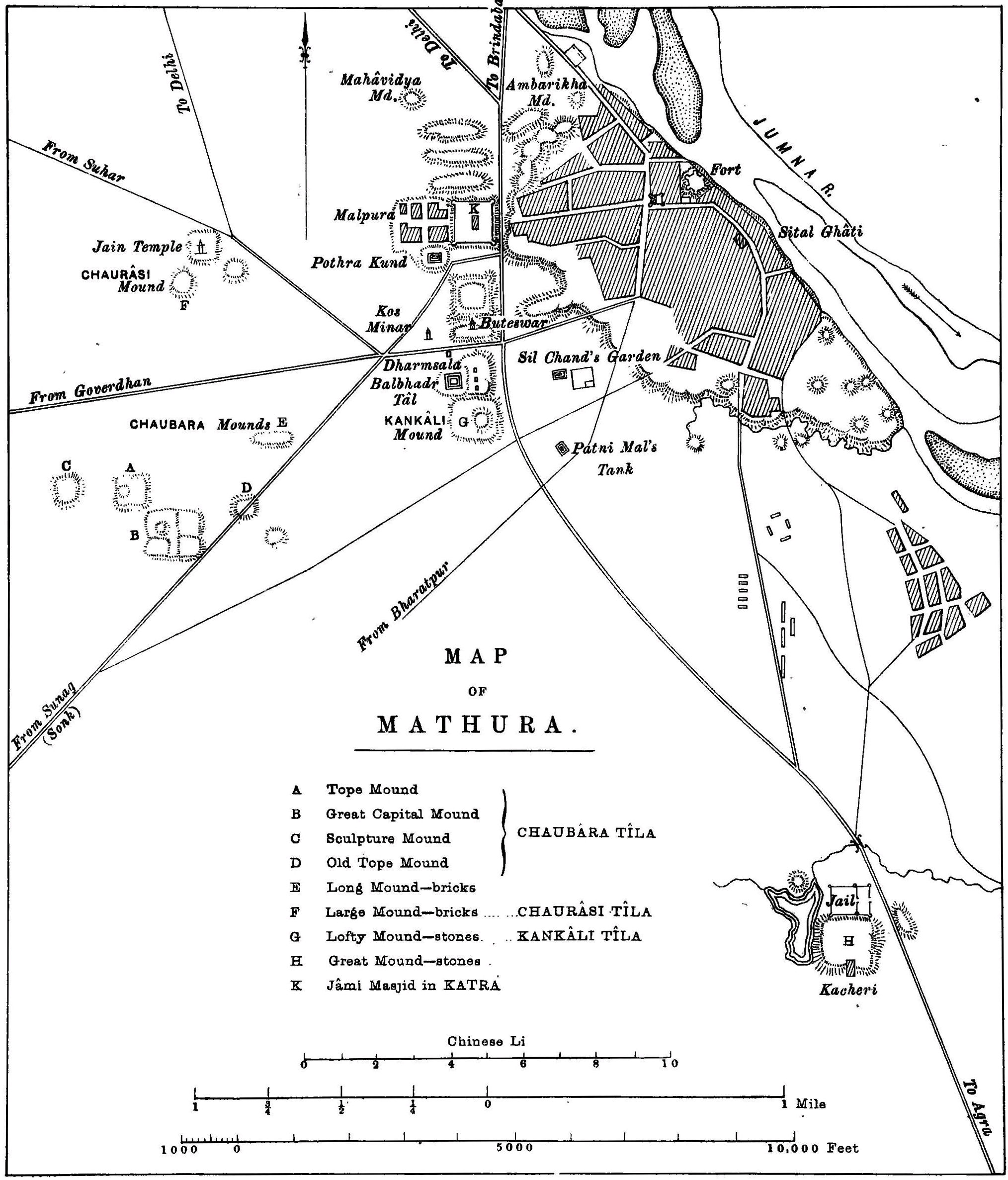
The tablet was found in Kankali Tila, right outside Mathura.

According to Smith, the initial year of the era used by the great Satrap Sodasa is not known, but the inscription may be considered as dating a few years earlier than the Christian era or the 1st century. According to others, it is not known if the date 42/72 is a regnal year of Sodasa, or an era founded by his father or another ruler.

According to some authors, the regnal date for Sodasa was 80 CE, so that the tablet would have been dedicated in 152 CE (50+72). A recent date for Sodasa's reign was given as 15 CE, meaning that the regnal date of the inscription would start from the Vikrama era started by Indo-Scythian king Azes I (Bikrami calendar (starting in 57 BCE)+72=15 CE). This would put the long reign of his father Rajuvula in the last quarter of the 1st century BCE, which is probable.

Another inscription of the Satrap Sodasa was found by Alexander Cunningham in the Jail mound at Mathura. His coins also are found in the neighborhood.

== Design ==
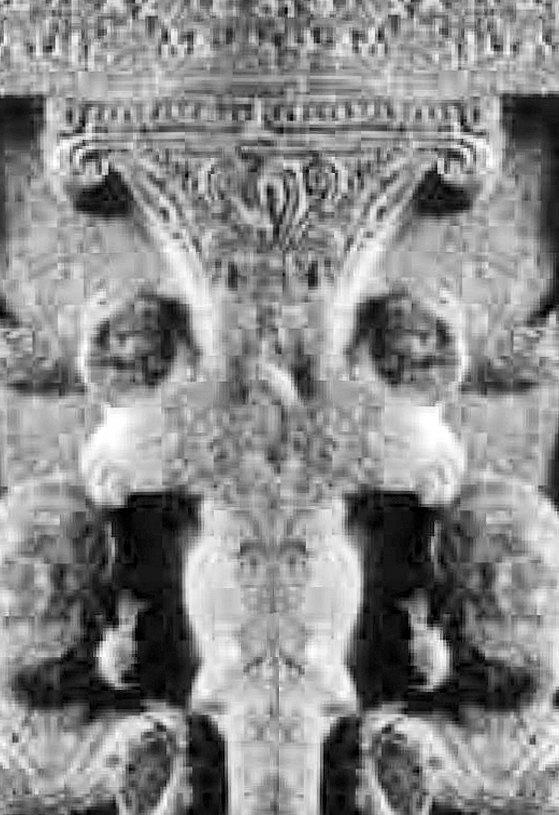
Splayed pillar with recumbent lions and central palmette on the Amohini ayagapata Mathura (mirrored half portion), 15 CE

The Amohini tablet being quite securely dated to circa 15 CE under the reign of Sodasa, the design elements function as artistic markers for many other works of art in northern Indian. Particularly, the splayed pillar with recumbent lions and central palmette is considered as derived from Hellenistic Indo-Greek designs, and similar pillars are depicted in Bharhut, Sanchi or Bodhgaya, suggesting similar dates.

== See also ==
- Parsvanatha ayagapata
- Vasu Śilāpaṭa
- Jain stupa
