= Vasu Śilāpaṭa =

Ancient Jain votive tablet from Mathura

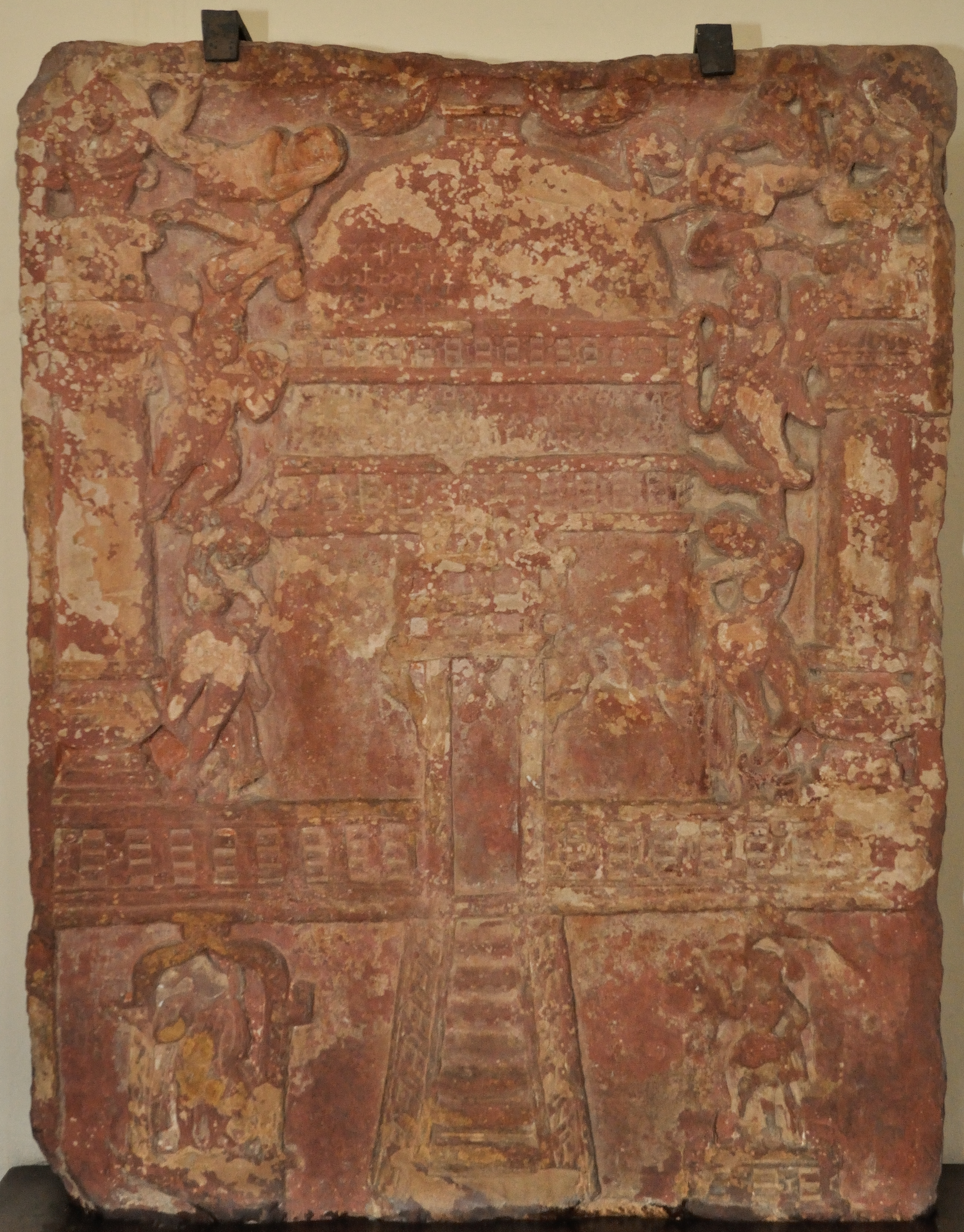
- Vasu Śilāpaṭa depicting a Jain stupa
- Type: Ayagapata
- Material: Red sandstone
- Created: 1st century CE
- Period/culture: Northern Satraps
- Discovered: January 1891; Kankali Tila, Mathura; 27°36′00″N 77°39′00″E
- Present location: Government Museum, Mathura
- Culture: Jainism

Location

The Vasu Śilāpaṭa is an ancient Jain votive tablet (āyāgapaṭa) from Kankali Tila, Mathura, dating to the early centuries of the Common Era. It was dedicated by a Jain laywoman named Vasu, daughter of the courtesan Loṇaśobhikā. The inscription on the tablet describes it as a śilāpaṭa ("stone slab") and records a group of religious donations made by Vasu and members of her family for the worship of the Arhats.

The tablet is particularly important for the study of early Jain worship at Mathura because its relief depicts a Jain stupa and its inscription records a shrine, an assembly hall, a cistern and the stone slab itself within a sanctuary of the Nirgrantha Arhats.

== Discovery and context ==
The Vasu Śilāpaṭa was discovered at Kankali Tila, an archaeological mound at Mathura that yielded a substantial collection of Jain sculptures, inscriptions and architectural remains. Numerous āyāgapaṭas, or tablets of homage, were recovered from the site. The āyāgapaṭas of Mathura are carved stone plaques associated with early Jain religious practice. They were produced principally during the first century BCE and first century CE and incorporate representations of Jinas, stupas, auspicious symbols and other objects associated with Jain worship. The Vasu tablet is unusual in that its own inscription employs the term śilāpaṭa rather than āyāgapaṭa. U. P. Shah regarded this inscription as important evidence for connecting the archaeological āyāgapaṭas of Mathura with the śilāpaṭas mentioned in Jain canonical literature.

== Inscription ==
The inscription begins with an invocation to Arhat Vardhamana, or Mahavira, the twenty-fourth Tirthankara. It identifies the donor as Vasu, daughter of Loṇaśobhikā (also rendered Lavaṇaśobhikā), a courtesan. Vasu herself is described as a courtesan and as a female disciple of Jain ascetics. The inscription records that Vasu established several religious structures and objects in the sanctuary of the Nirgrantha Arhats. These comprised a shrine of the Arhat (devikula), an assembly or worship hall (āyāgasabhā), a cistern (prapā) and a stone slab (śilāpaṭa). The dedication was made together with members of Vasu's family and household for the worship of the Arhats. The inscription is significant for documenting female patronage of Jain religious establishments at ancient Mathura. It also provides direct epigraphical evidence for the terminology and religious setting associated with early Jain votive tablets.

== Iconography ==
The central architectural subject of the relief is a Jain stupa. The stupa stands on an elevated platform approached by a flight of steps and is enclosed by a railing. The composition includes architectural columns flanking the stupa. The relief therefore provides evidence for the visual representation of Jain stupas and their associated sacred architecture at Mathura during the early historic period. The relief also contains figures associated with worship of the stupa. Among them are partially clothed Jain monks represented in association with the monument. Quintanilla relates these figures to the early Jain monastic tradition represented in the art of Mathura. Female figures appear near the railing of the stupa, while subsidiary divine figures occupy niches in the lower part of the composition.

== The stupa representation ==
The Vasu Śilāpaṭa is an important visual source for reconstructing the form of early Jain stupas at Mathura. The represented stupa is elevated above its surroundings on a high platform reached by a stairway. The drum of the stupa is represented as a tall cylindrical structure composed of superimposed sections separated by decorative bands and railings. The architectural representation differs in several respects from contemporary Buddhist stupa imagery and has been used in studies of the development of Jain sacred architecture at Mathura. The relief also depicts a monumental gateway and columns associated with the approach to the stupa.

== Religious significance ==
The inscription provides evidence that the tablet formed part of a wider Jain religious establishment rather than functioning as an isolated object. Vasu's donation included not only the śilāpaṭa but also a shrine, an āyāgasabhā and a cistern. Shah connected the Vasu inscription with descriptions in Jain canonical literature of śilāpaṭas placed on seats beneath sacred caitya trees. On this basis, he argued that the Mathura āyāgapaṭas developed from an older tradition of worship involving such stone tablets. The tablet also illustrates the role of lay patronage in early Jainism at Mathura. Vasu's inscription records the participation of members of her family and household in the dedication.

== Significance in Jain art ==
The Vasu Śilāpaṭa belongs to the substantial corpus of Jain votive tablets discovered at Kankali Tila. These tablets are among the principal archaeological sources for the development of Jain imagery and ritual practices at ancient Mathura. The combination of inscription and relief makes the Vasu tablet particularly valuable. The inscription identifies the donor, the religious community and the structures associated with the donation, while the relief preserves a representation of a Jain stupa and its worshippers. Its use of the term śilāpaṭa has additionally played an important role in scholarly attempts to interpret the function and origins of the Mathura āyāgapaṭas.

== See also ==
- Ayagapata
- Kankali Tila
- Jain stupa
- Parsvanatha ayagapata
- Kankali Tila tablet of Sodasa
- Mathura art

== Sources ==
- Lüders, Heinrich (1912). "Appendix: A List of Brahmi Inscriptions from the Earliest Times to about A.D. 400". Epigraphia Indica. Vol. 10. Calcutta: Government of India.
- Quintanilla, Sonya Rhie (2000). "Āyāgapaṭas: Characteristics, Symbolism, and Chronology". Artibus Asiae. 60 (1): 79–137. doi:10.2307/3249941. JSTOR 3249941.
- Quintanilla, Sonya Rhie (2007). History of Early Stone Sculpture at Mathura: Ca. 150 BCE–100 CE. Studies in Asian Art and Archaeology. Vol. 25. Leiden: Brill. doi:10.1163/ej.9789004155374.i-524. ISBN 9789004155374.
- Shah, Umakant P. (1987). Jaina-rūpa-maṇḍana: Jaina Iconography. New Delhi: Abhinav Publications. ISBN 9788170172086.
- Sharma, U. K. (2001). History of Jainism with Special Reference to Mathura. New Delhi: D. K. Printworld. ISBN 9788124601587.
