= State Museum, Lucknow =

Museum in Uttar Pradesh, India

State Museum Lucknow
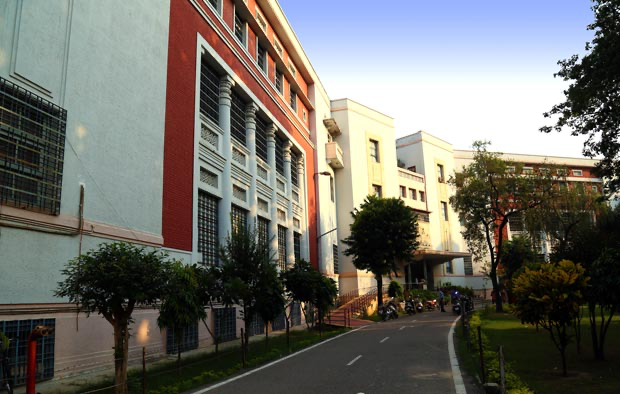
- State Museum, Lucknow (exterior)

- Location within India
- Established: 1863; 163 years ago
- Location: Lucknow, Uttar Pradesh
- Coordinates: 26°50′43″N 80°57′17″E
- Type: State museum
- Collections: Archeology, Painting, Manuscripts, Numismatic, Decorative Arts
- Owner: Uttar Pradesh Government

The State Museum in Lucknow is a prominent museum located in the capital city of Uttar Pradesh, India. The museum is in the Nawab Wajid Ali Shah Zoological Gardens, Banarasi Bagh, Lucknow. The museum was established in 1863 from the collection of Colonel Saunders Alexius Abbott, and was given the status of ‘Provincial Museum’ before being renamed the ‘State Museum’ in 1950.

The collection housed in the museum consists of objects from the prehistoric period, Bronze Age, plaster casts of famous figurines from the Indus Valley civilization, as well as collections of numismatics, paintings, manuscripts and textiles.

== History ==
The museum began in 1863 with a collection of artifacts that were housed in the building of the Choti Chattar Manzil in Qaisar Bagh by the then commissioner of Lucknow, Colonel Abbott. This repository functioned as a municipal institution in its early days until 1883, when it was given the status of a "Provincial Museum". The museum was transferred to a larger space in the erstwhile coronation hall of the Nawabs of Awadh, Lal Baradari in June 1884.

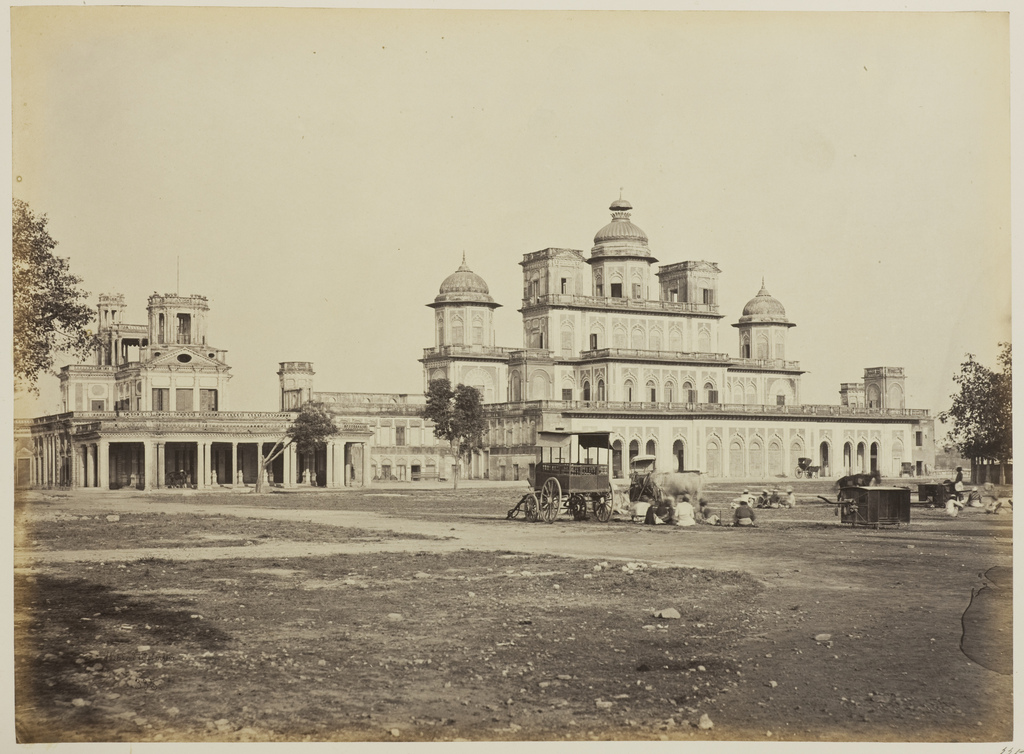
Building of the Choti Chattar Manzil, initial location of the Lucknow Provincial Museum.

A special archeological section of the museum was established in 1909, using the premises of the old Canning College in Qaiser Bagh. The museum was formally organized in the same year with the constitution of a Management Committee.

Some important figures who also contributed to the formation of the museum from the colonial period include Mr. A. O. Hume, who was an important member of the management committee. In 1867 the first superintendent of the museum was Emanuel Bonavia, a surgeon. The first curator of the museum, archeologist Dr. A.A. Fuhrer was appointed on 30 March 1885. Fuhrer's expertise and interest in the field of archeology was reflected in his first contribution to the collection of the museum, excavation at Kankali Mound at Mathura in three consecutive periods covering 1888–89, 1889–90 and 1890–91. All the excavated antiquities recovered from the site were relocated to the erstwhile Provincial Museum.

The museum undertook other important excavations including one at Ahichchhatra in 1891–92, the 1912–12 at Kasia and subsequent excavations at Indor Khera, Sankisa, Unchgaon and Astabhuja. These excavations and subsequent collections from the same contributed to the important Archeological section of the museum.

The museum was renamed the "State Museum" in 1950, with an expanded collection that necessitated better organization and a separate space. The museum was eventually moved to an independent building in Banarasibagh. The building is located in the middle of the Nawab Wajid Ali Shah Zoological Gardens (formerly the Prince of Wales Zoological Gardens) and the new museum premises were inaugurated by the then Prime Minister Jawaharlal Nehru in 1963.

== Collections ==
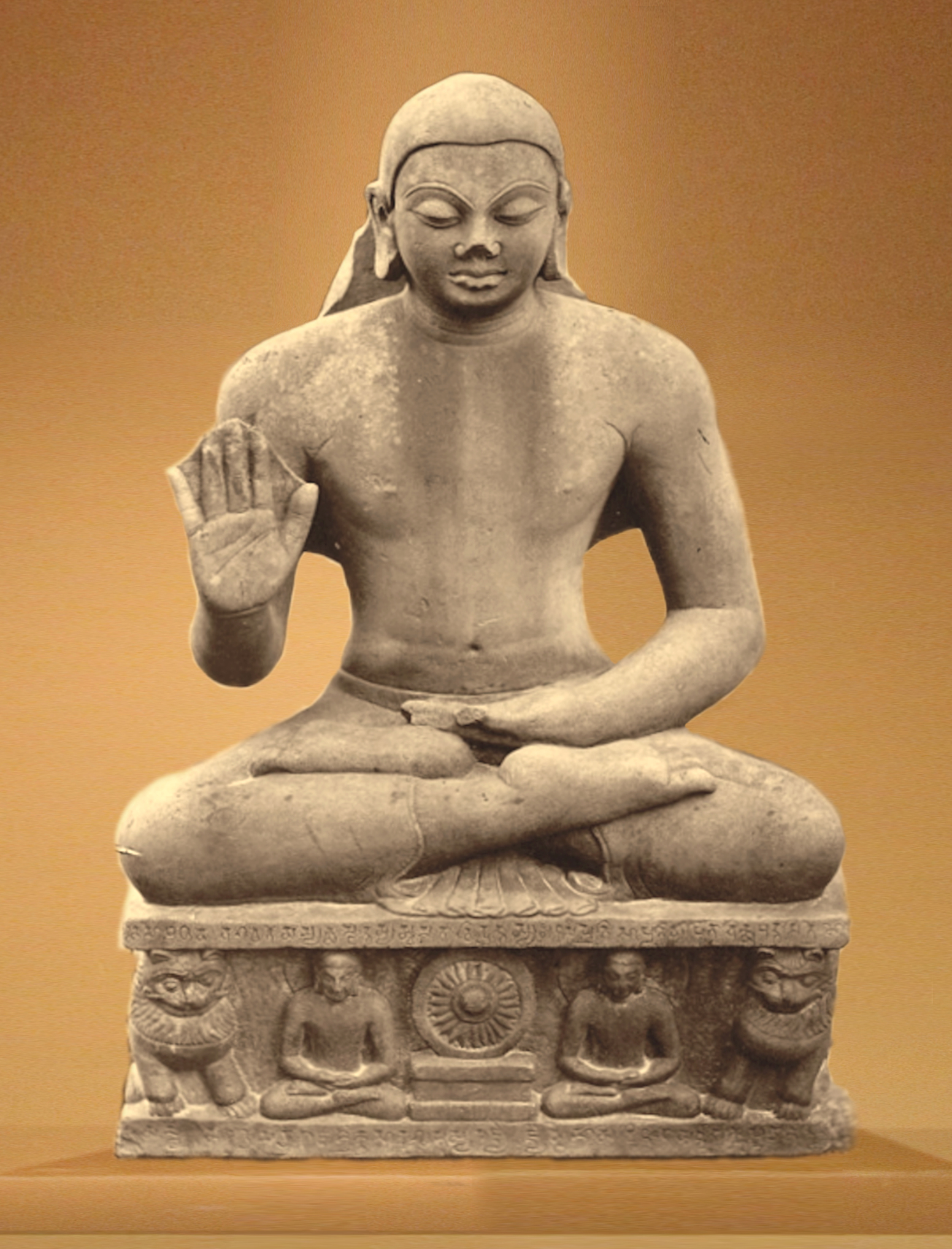
The Mankuwar Buddha, with inscribed date "year 129 in the reign of Maharaja Kumaragupta", hence 448 CE, is an important chronological marker for Gupta art. Mankuwar, District of Allahabad. Lucknow Museum.

The museum has a variety of collections ranging from archeological assets to paintings and a rich numismatic collection. These items are housed in specialized galleries based on the type of collection and display a select few objects. The history of the museum is rooted in practices of colonial collecting, with the vast number of archeological expeditions that had been undertaken by the museum corresponding to the primary collection of the institution. The archeological gallery therefore becomes an important part of the museum and is highlighted as a result of it being a primary and vast collection.

=== Archeological collection ===
The archeological collection is considered to be the central most in the museum. It consists of antiquities from the prehistoric period, the Bronze Age, plaster casts of famous figurines from the Indus Valley, clay seals, inscriptions, pottery and other miscellaneous objects including bricks and weights. This collection is divided into two galleries, with the first containing early, medieval and late Stone Age implements from the Uttar Pradesh and Sindh area. The first archeological gallery includes objects of the Bronze Age from the Doab area, Mathura grey schist sculptures and friezes as well as sandstone sculptures, sculptures from the Mauryan dynasty and Sunga dynasty, Kushana period terracotta sculptures, terracottas from the Gupta period with significant objects being the inscribed clay tablets of Shravasti and Bhitargaon.

The second archeological gallery includes Buddhist sculptures, narrative friezes, decapitated images of Bodhisattva, and an inscription bearing Buddhist sculpture from Shravasti. It displays examples of Gandharan art, such as a frieze of Buddha giving a sermon, and the head of Buddha.

The gallery also houses images of Hindu gods such as Lakshmi and Shiva. It houses art of the medieval period including Pala art, as well as the Gajalakshmi from Bhitri, Durga from Sultanpur, Avalokiteshvara seated on a lion. Dr. N.P Joshi highlights the Brahmanical sculptures in the museum in a two volume work and their importance in studying iconographic representations. Joshi was also the former director of the museum in the 1970s and uses this expertise and access to write two academically significant volumes specifically detailing the sculptural works of the museum.

The museum guide mentions a reserve collection of stone and terracotta images, plaster casts, copper plates and royal inscriptions. The reserve collection houses some important and notable items including the Bhitri seal, Hadaha inscription, as well as more than four hundred metal sculptures with Jain, Buddhist and Hindu affiliations. These objects, however, are part of the museum collection but not regularly displayed in the museum.

=== Numismatics ===
The State Museum of Lucknow also contains the Uttar Pradesh Coin Committee's headquarters, and the director of the museum is the ex-officio secretary of this committee. Therefore, the museum collection houses a vast number of coins, with most of them in the reserve collection. The collection is divided into three chronological sections— the first section containing coins between the 8th century BC to 2nd century AD, the second containing coins from the Mughal period and the last section displaying military medals awarded to British soldiers sent on missions. Coins from Panchal, Ayodhya as well as Indo-Greek kingdoms along with Indo-Parthian, Kushana and Gupta coins can be found in this collection. Coins from the Dutch East India Company, the British East India Company and the Provincial states of Awadh and Garhwal are part of this collection.

=== Paintings ===
The museum contains a large number of miniatures and paintings from various schools of the early medieval period. Some notable objects include a Jain Kalpasutra manuscript from the 15th – 16th centuries, Mughal miniature paintings bearing court and battle scenes, Pahari miniatures, Tangka and Tanjore paintings. The manuscript collection of the museum includes notable objects such as the 1593 Padmavat written by Jayasi and an Akbari period Harivamsa.

=== Weapons, decorative arts and musical instruments ===
Decorative arts are included separately in the Awadh gallery and are housed in the museum collection with objects including Jade items, wooden cabinets, embroidered or jewel encrusted garments and jewelry.

Weapons housed in the museum's collection include objects from the 16th to the 19th centuries including guns, canons, bow and arrow sets. The musical instruments is a relatively small collection with string instruments such as the veena, sarangi and muraina as well as percussion instruments like tabla, dholak, nagara and damroo, and wind instruments including the flute, conch shell and algoza.

=== The Awadh Gallery ===
This gallery houses items from the culturally unique phase that had been introduced during the reign of nawabs in Lucknow. The gallery is a precipitate of a temporary exhibition from 1985, and houses cultural objects from the area produced during the rule of Nawab Asif-ud-Daula and his successors. This section includes Bidri work objects such as hookah, spittoon, boxes and plates, gold and silver inlay works, ivory carving, glass work and samples of Chikan and Jamdani work.This section also includes miniature paintings from the Awadh school and oil paintings.

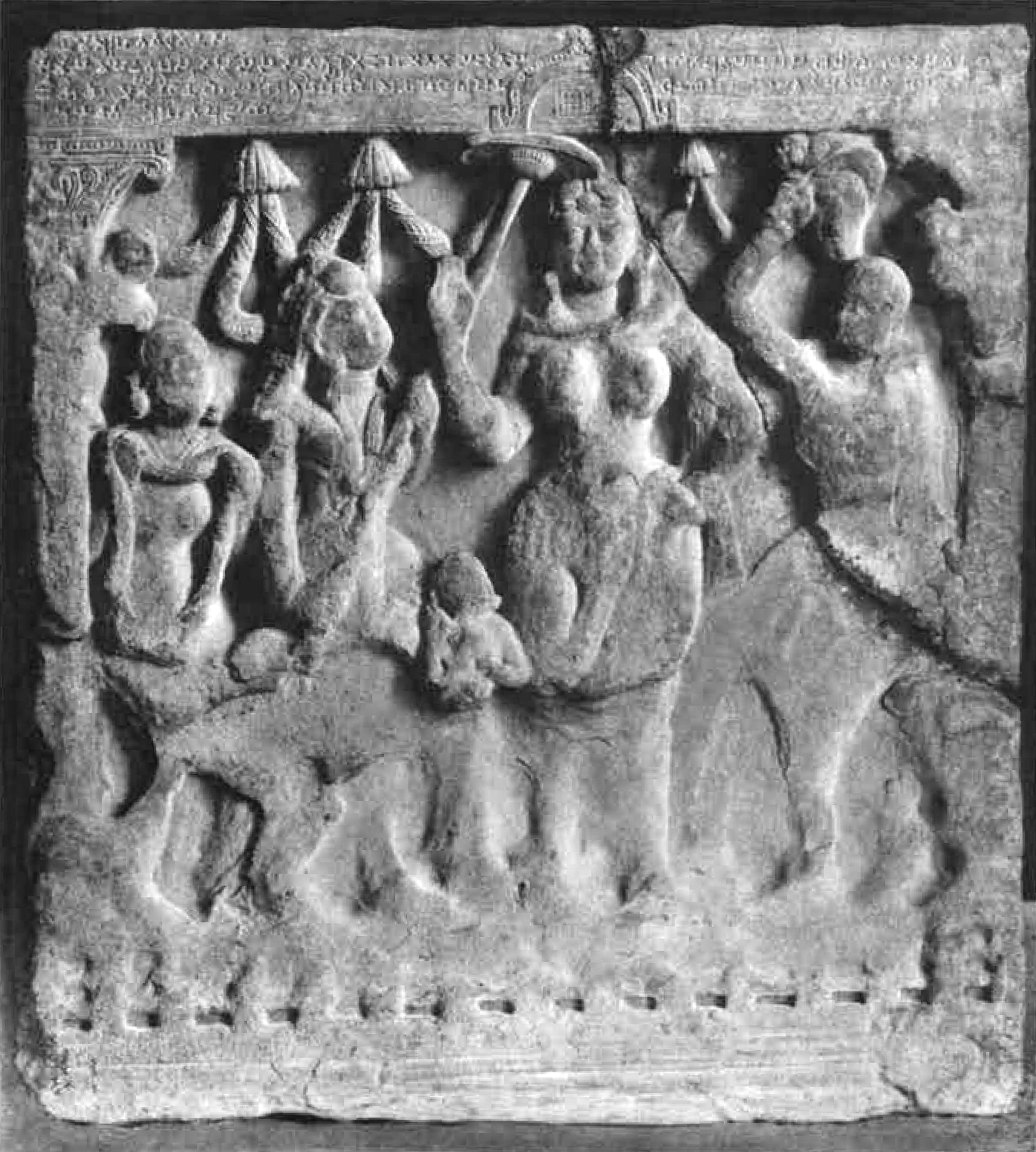
A Kankali Tila plate, with an inscription mentioning the year 42 of the reign of Northern Satraps ruler Sodasa

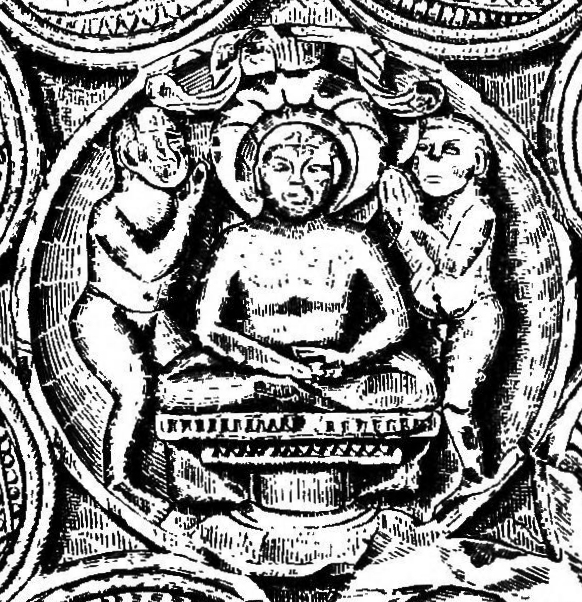
Parsvanatha ayagapata, Mathura art, c. 15 CE.

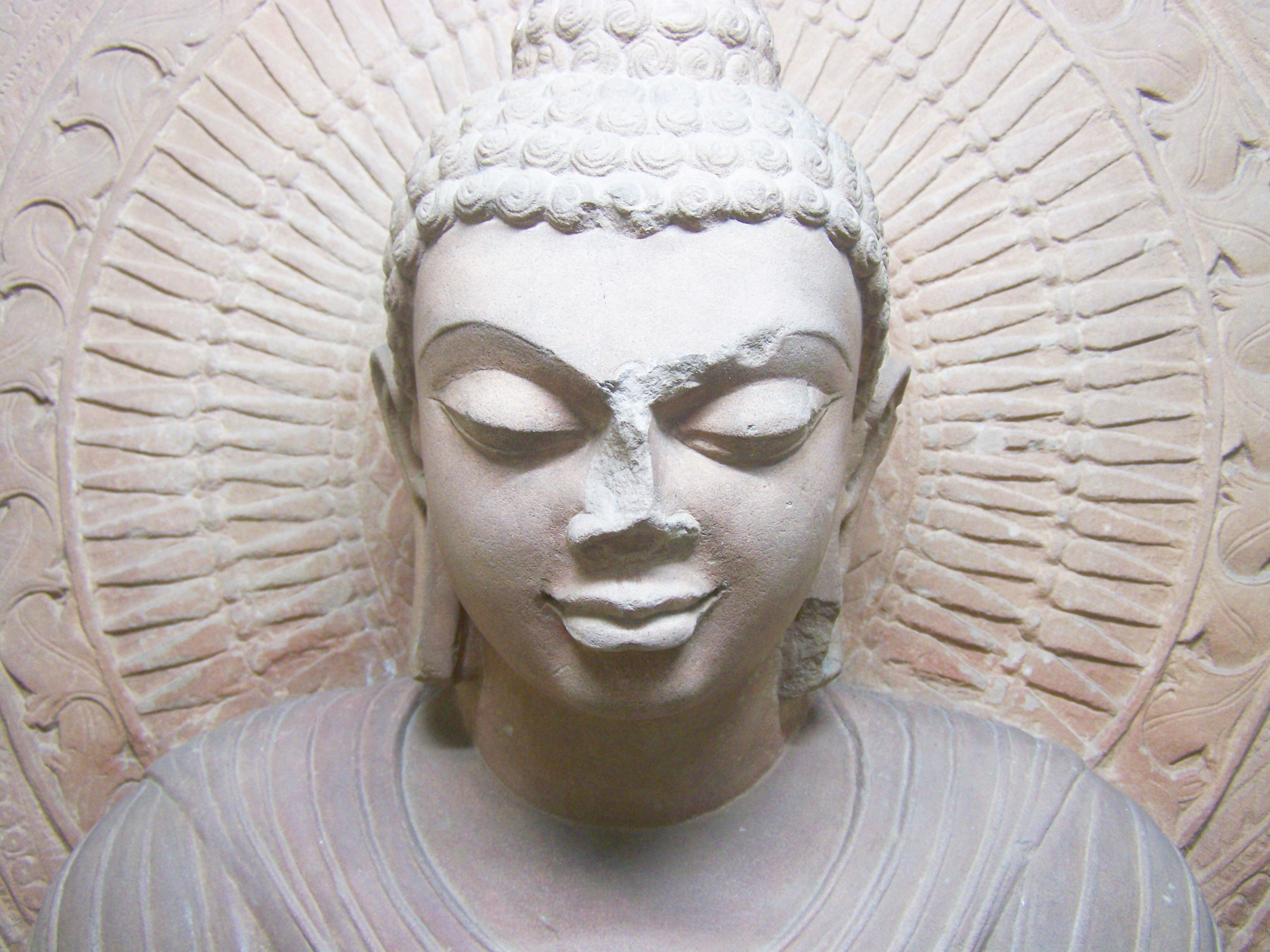
Buddha, 5th century

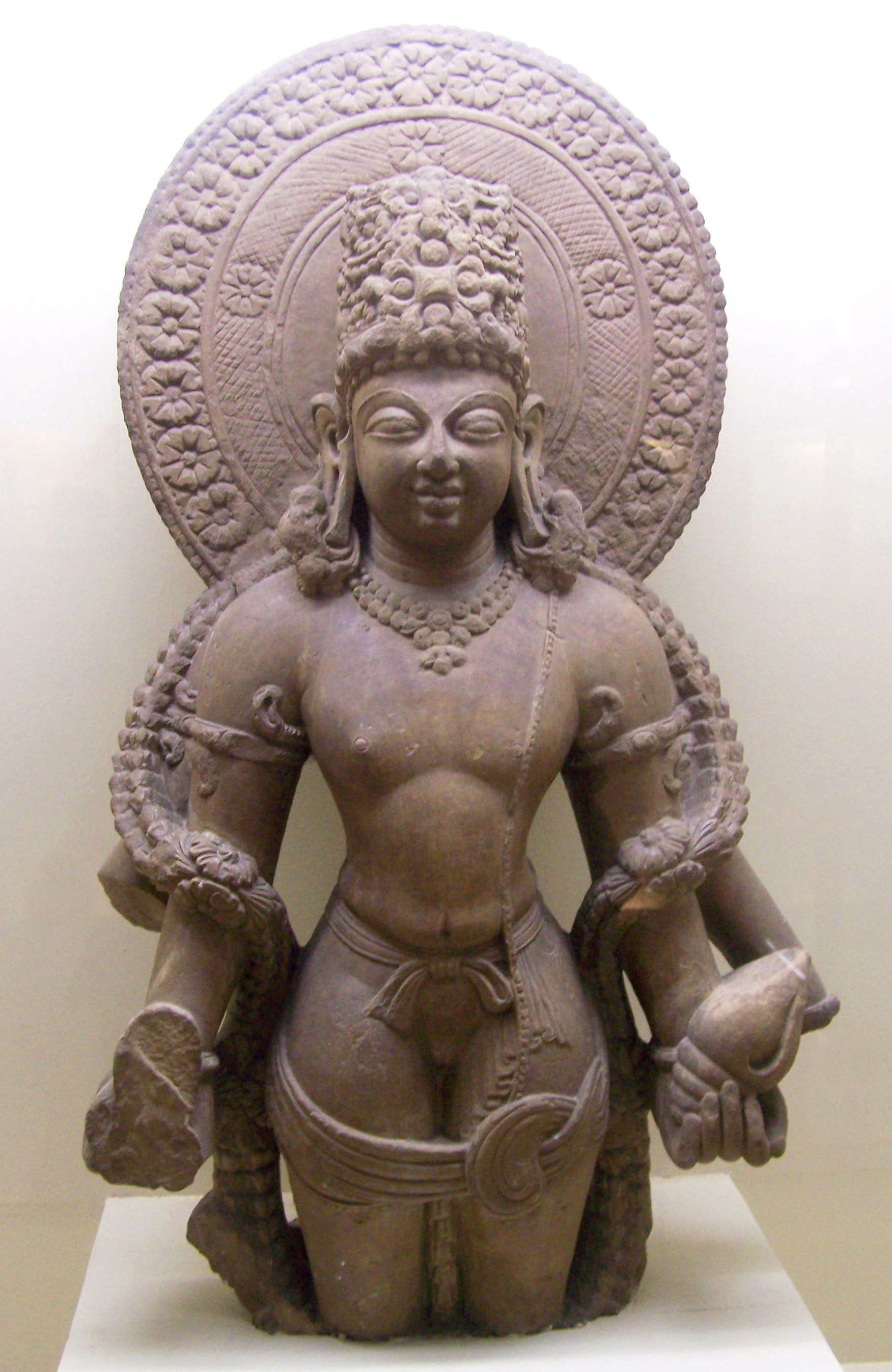
Vishnu, 5th century

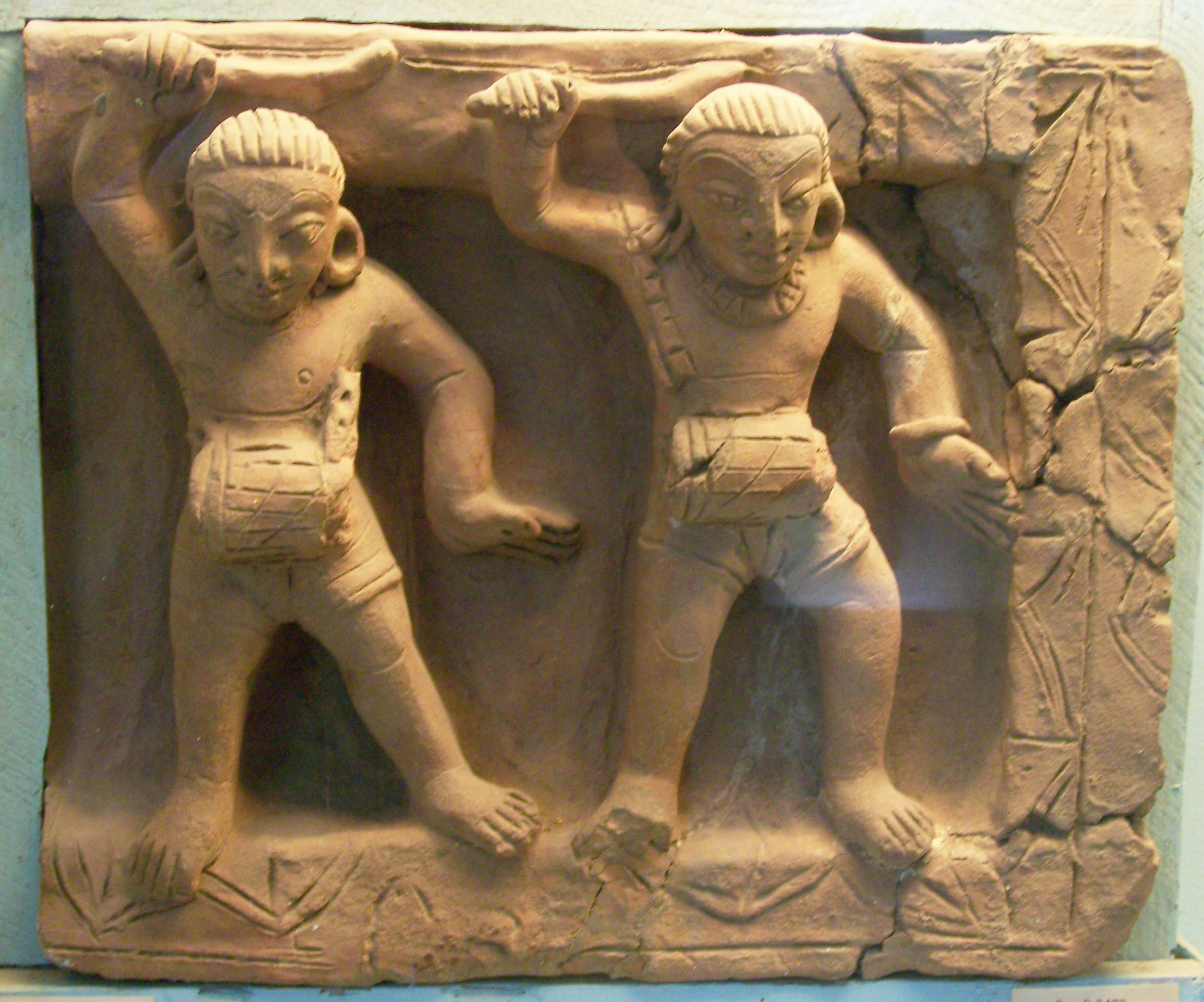
Terrocota drummers, 6th century

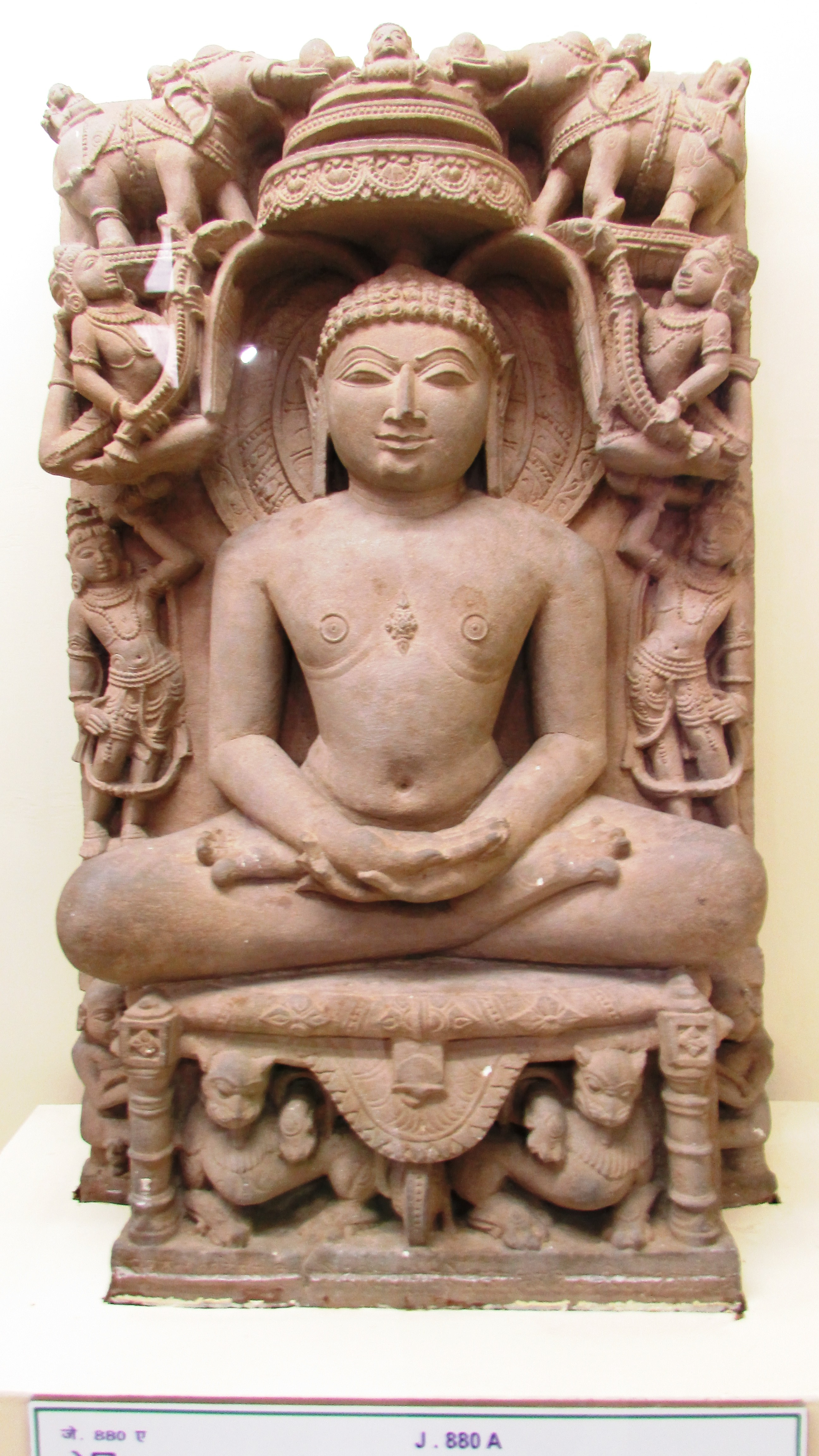
Tirthankar

== Educational programs ==
The museum's organizing committee consists of the museum director at the apex and two deputy directors. The deputy directors also function as members of the Academic branch because of their qualification as scholars, different from officials in the administrative branch. The deputy directors are in charge of museum collection, its expansion, rotation of exhibits and special programs of the museum. The Academic branch is located in the museum premises itself, allowing for those in charge to be in proximity to the museum's collections as well as facilitating the day to day pedagogic functioning of the museum.

The primary vision of the museum as defined by its academic branch is for educating the public. This goal of public oriented education drives the primary educational functions in the museum, including a highly popular annual Art Appreciation course where scholars are invited to lecture on different themes each year, often corresponding with the museum's collections. The museum also organizes the V.S. Agarwala Memorial Lecture and the director and assistant directors also impart lectures in the museum, although the art appreciation course enjoys a wider popularity and garners larger audiences in attendance. The museum's primary function as imparting knowledge to the public around and about the collection it houses and preserves corresponds with their efforts to engage the public "from all walks of life" to participate in the same. The museum's primary visitor, however, is the tourist or casual recreational visitor to the zoo premises, tying the role of this museum tightly with the recreational mode associated with a visit to a tourist attraction.

== Facilities ==
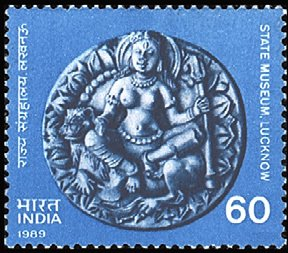
Stamp of India 1989 Lucknow Museum's 125th Anniversary

The museum houses a library that is accessible on special request by scholars affiliated to educational institutions. The personal libraries of Prof. B.N. Puri and Dr. C.D. Chaterji are a part of the museum library.

The Conservation Cell of the museum houses facilities of chemical treatment and restoration of stone, ceramic, terracotta, metal, wood, coins and ivory objects, The photographic library contains black and white and colour prints documenting objects in the museum.

The publications counter of the museum contains catalogues and brochures of the museum, as well as research publications on specific collections.

The auditorium of the museum, located on the ground floor, has the capacity to house around two hundred people and its used most often to deliver lectures by scholars invited by the museum.
