= Jain stupa =

Type of stupa erected by the Jains for devotional purposes

Jain stupa
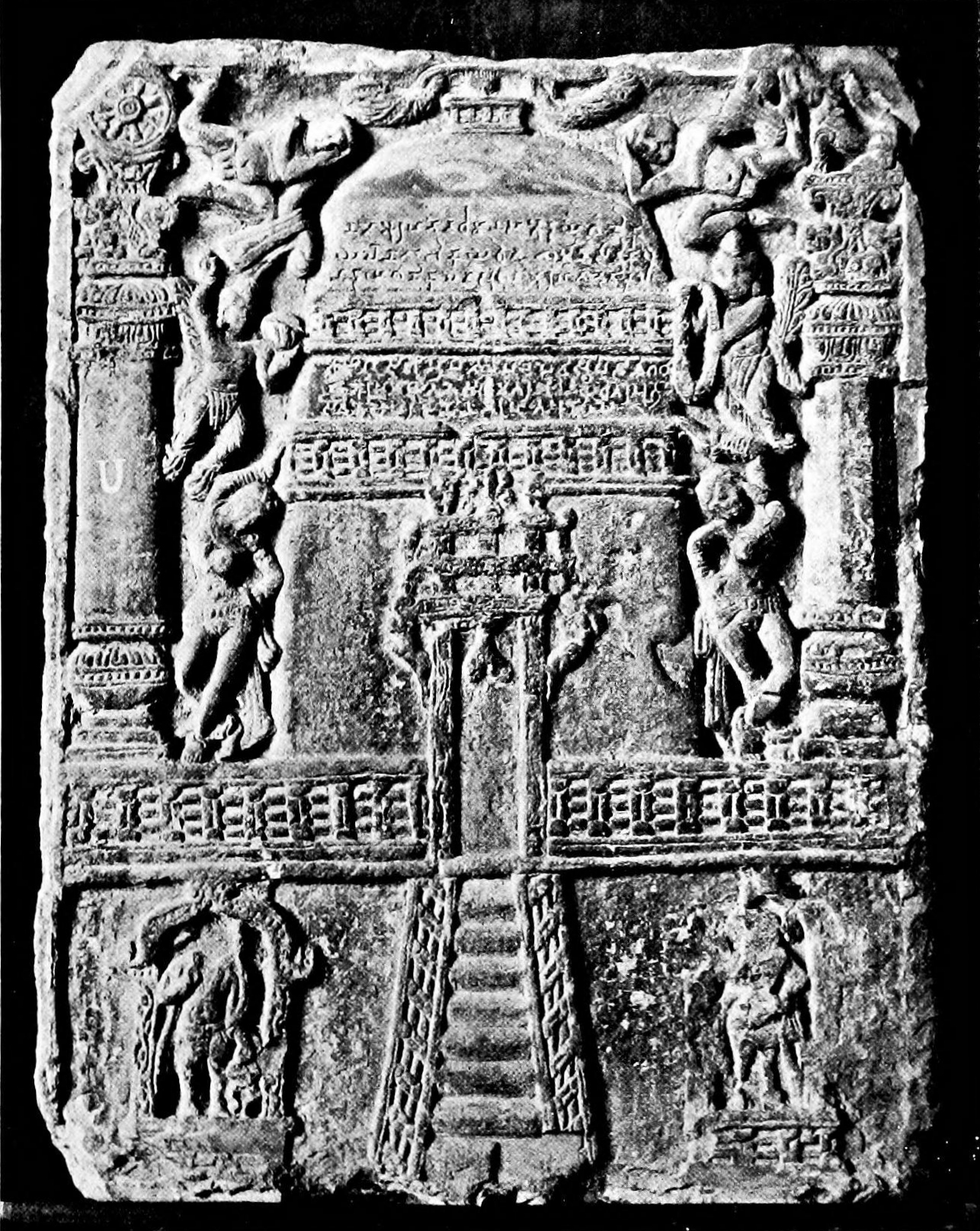
Jain votive plaque with Jain stupa, the "Vasu Śilāpaṭa" ayagapata, 1st century CE, excavated from Kankali Tila, Mathura.
The inscription reads:
"Adoration to the Arhat Vardhamana. The daughter of the matron (?) courtesan Lonasobhika (Lavanasobhika), the disciple of the ascetics, the junior (?) courtesan Vasu has erected a shrine of the Arhat, a hall of homage (ayagasabha), cistern and a stone slab at the sanctuary of the Nirgrantha Arhats, together with her mother, her daughter, her son and her whole household in honour of the Arhats."

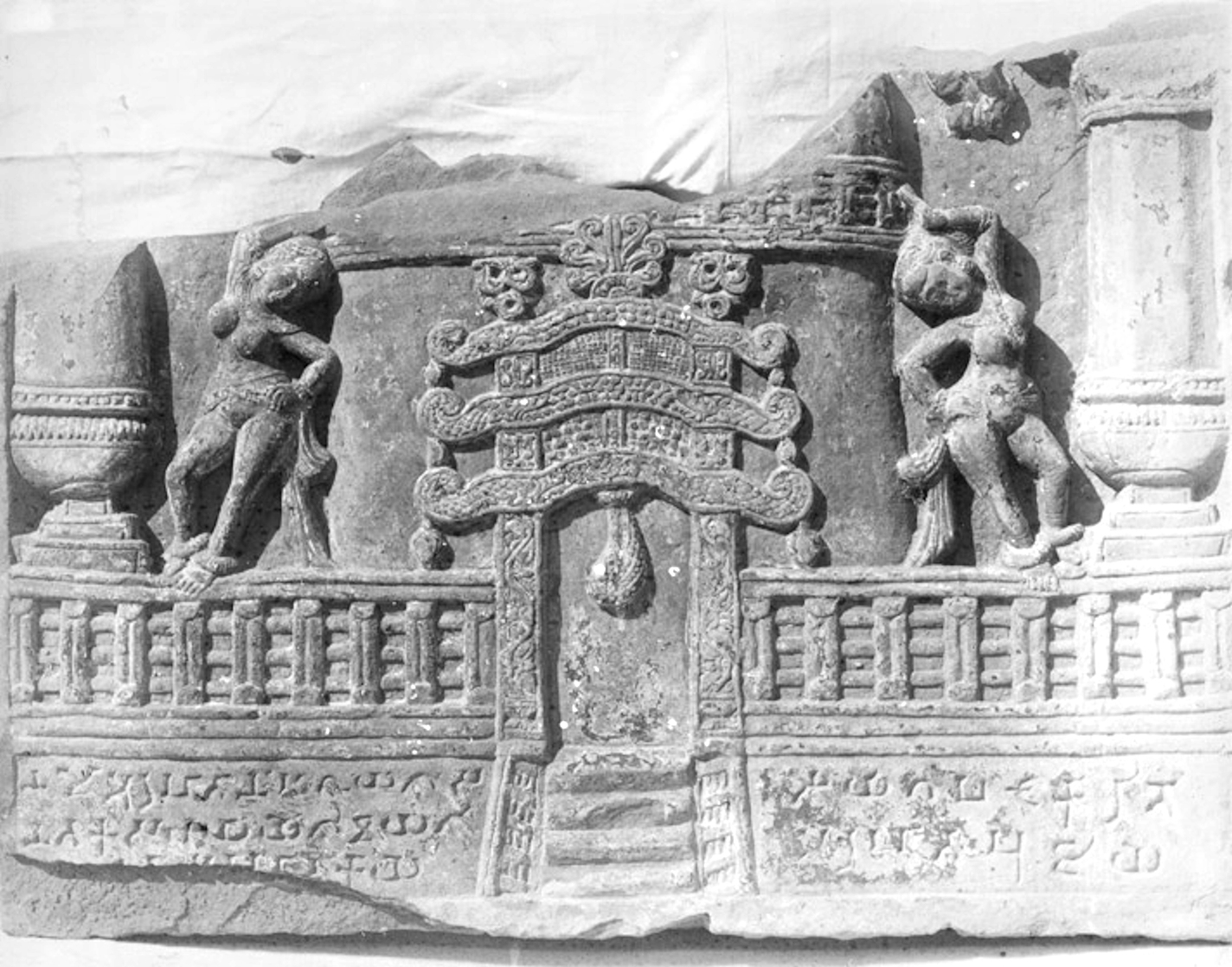
Sivayasa Ayagapata, with stupa fragment, Kankali Tila, 75-100 CE.

The Jain stupa was a type of stupa erected by the Jains for devotional purposes.

A Jain stupa dated to the 2nd century BCE-1st century CE was excavated at Mathura in the 19th century, in the Kankali Tila mound. The oldest inscribed sculpture is dated to 150 B.C. There is also a brief dedication in a more ancient and archaic Prakrit dialect, making it clear that there was a Jaina temple in Mathura before 150 B.C. as well.

Legends state that the earliest Jain stupa for the 23rd Tirthankara was built in the 8th century BCE, before the time of the Jina Parsvanatha.

Jain scriptures also describe stupa construction and veneration associated with Tirthankaras predating Pārśvanātha, including the Vividha Tirtha Kalpa's Mathurapuri Kalpa section by Jinaprabha Suri (drawing on earlier traditions), which details a deva-built stupa originally erected for the 7th Tirthankara Suparshvanatha and later encased in bricks during Pārśvanātha’s time. Similar references to chaitya-stupa appear in the Ācārāṅga Sūtra, Bhagavatī Sūtra, and related Āgamas written in Ardhamagadhi Prakrit.

There is a possibility that the Buddhists adopted stupa worships from Jains. However the Jain stupa has a peculiar cylindrical three-tier structure, which is quite reminiscent of the Samavasarana, by which it was apparently ultimately replaced as an object of worship. The name for stupa as used in Jain inscriptions is the standard word "thupe".

Moreover, according to The Jain Stupa and Other Antiquities of Mathura, the Mathura Stupa was already so ancient that the Samvat 79 inscription (156–157 CE) refers to it as being built by the Deva deities themselves. Therefore it is claimed that it was probably erected several centuries before the Christian era, and may predate oldest Buddhist Stupa.

== Mathura Jain stupas ==
A Jain stupa dated to the 2nd century BCE-1st century CE was excavated at Mathura in the 19th century, in the Kankali Tila mound.

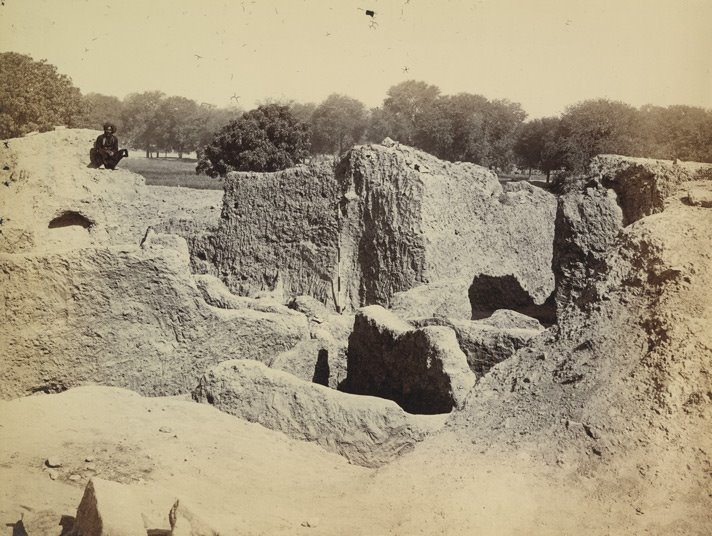
View of the Jain Stupa as excavated at Kankali Tila, c. 1889

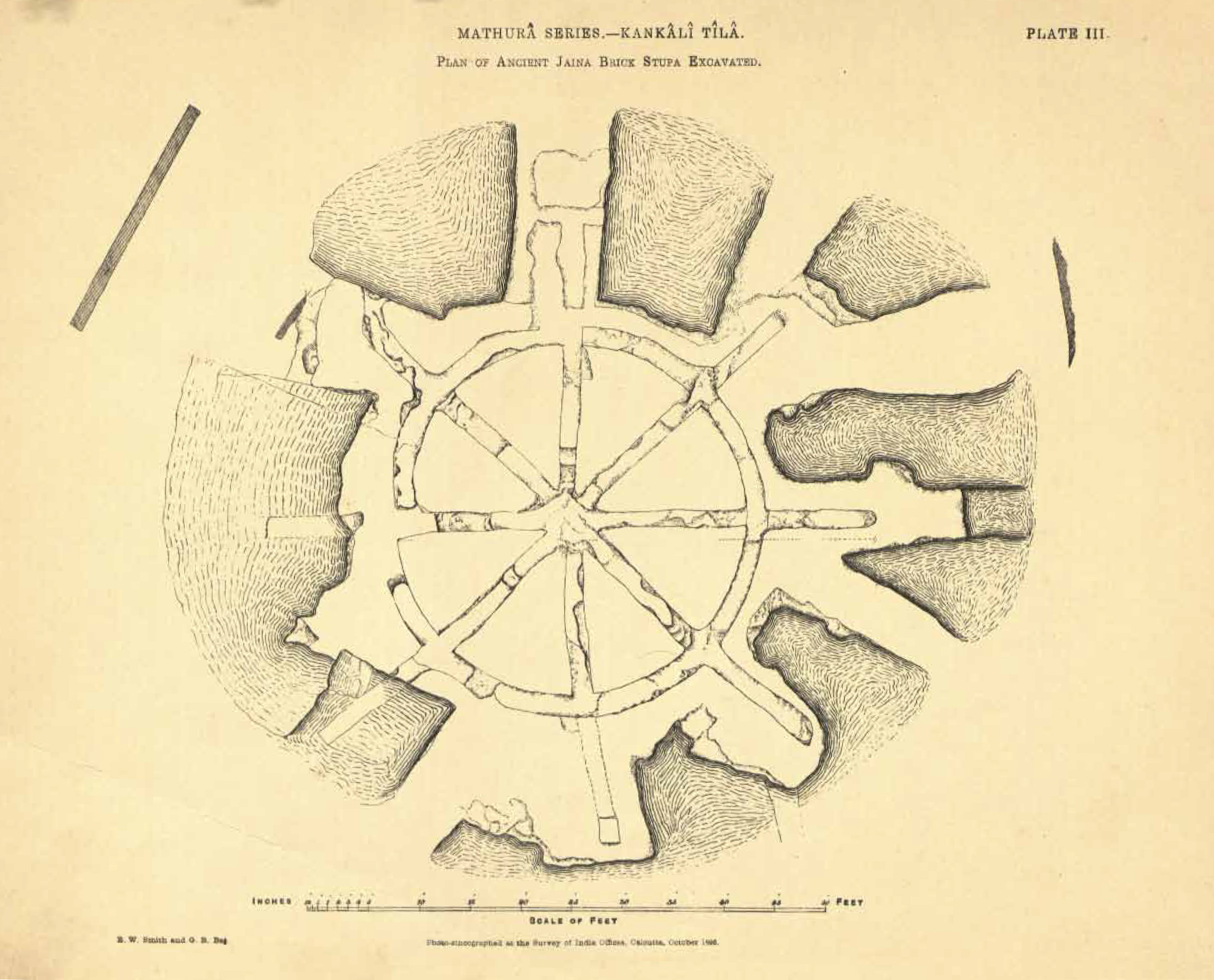
Plan of the stupa at Kankali Tila

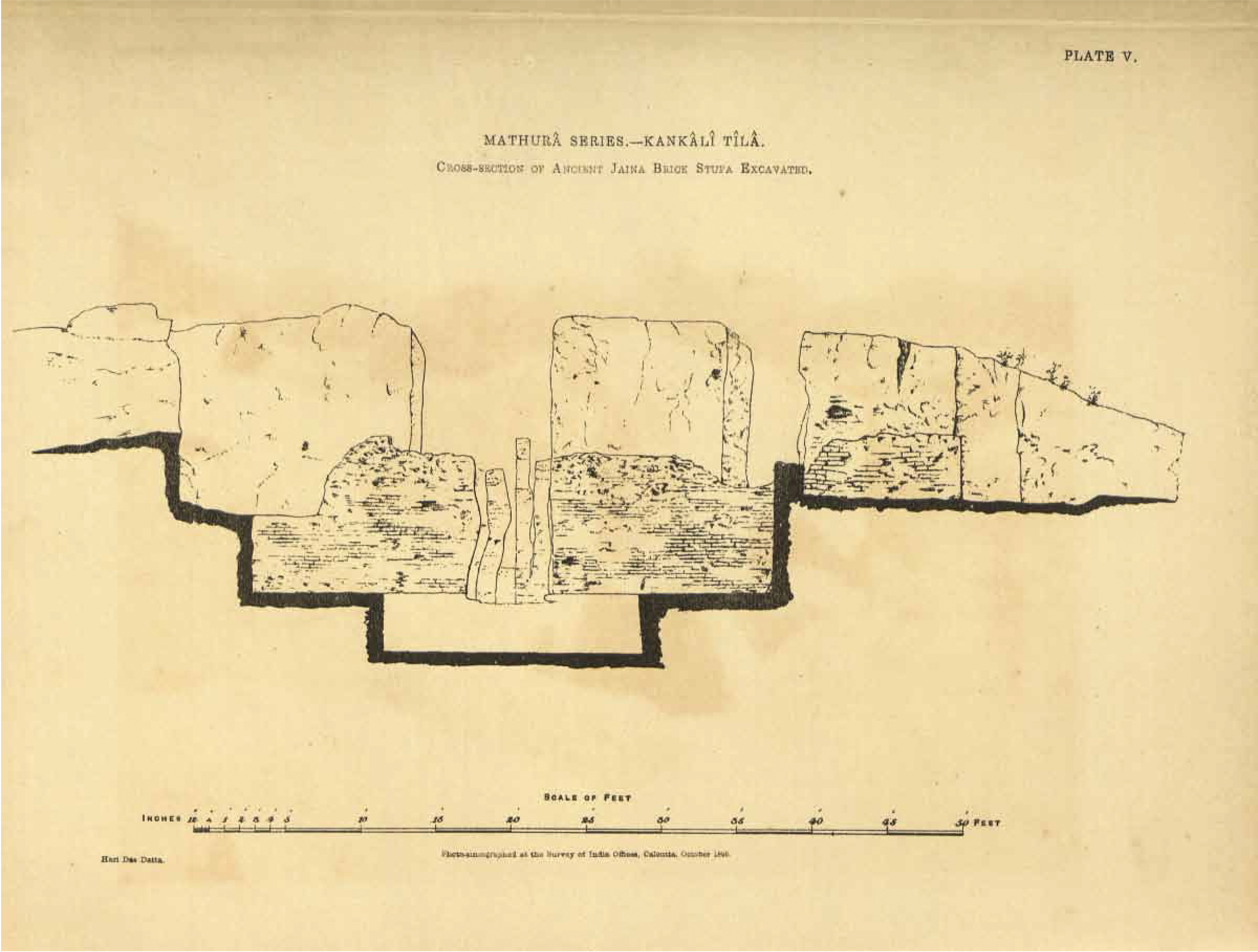
Cross-section of the stupa at Kankali Tila

Numerous associated religious works of art were also discovered during the excavations. Many of these are votive tablets, called ayagapatas. They are numerous, and some of the earliest ones have been dated to circa 50-20 BCE.

According to Jain legends, five Jain stupas were built in Mathura.

== Ayagapatas ==
The Jain devotional reliefs called Ayagapatas, particularly that dedicated by Vasu, shows a probable design of the Jain stupa. The stupa drum is set on a high platform, and accessed by a flight of stairs and an ornate torana gate, quite similar in style to the toranas of Sanchi. Niches with images can be seen in front of the platform. The drum of the stupa is elongated and cylindrical, and formed of three superposed tiers separated by railings and decorated bands. The stupa starts to round off only above these three tiers. The platform may have been squared, with Persepolitan-type columns in each corner, similar to those seen in the Vasu Ayagapata. On the Vasu ayagapata, one of the Persepolitan pillars is surmounted by a Dharmachakra wheel, and the other pillar was probably surmounted by an animal, as seen in other similar ayagapatas.

The Sivayasa ayagapata shows clearly two triratna symbols on top of the torana, as well as a central flame palmette design.

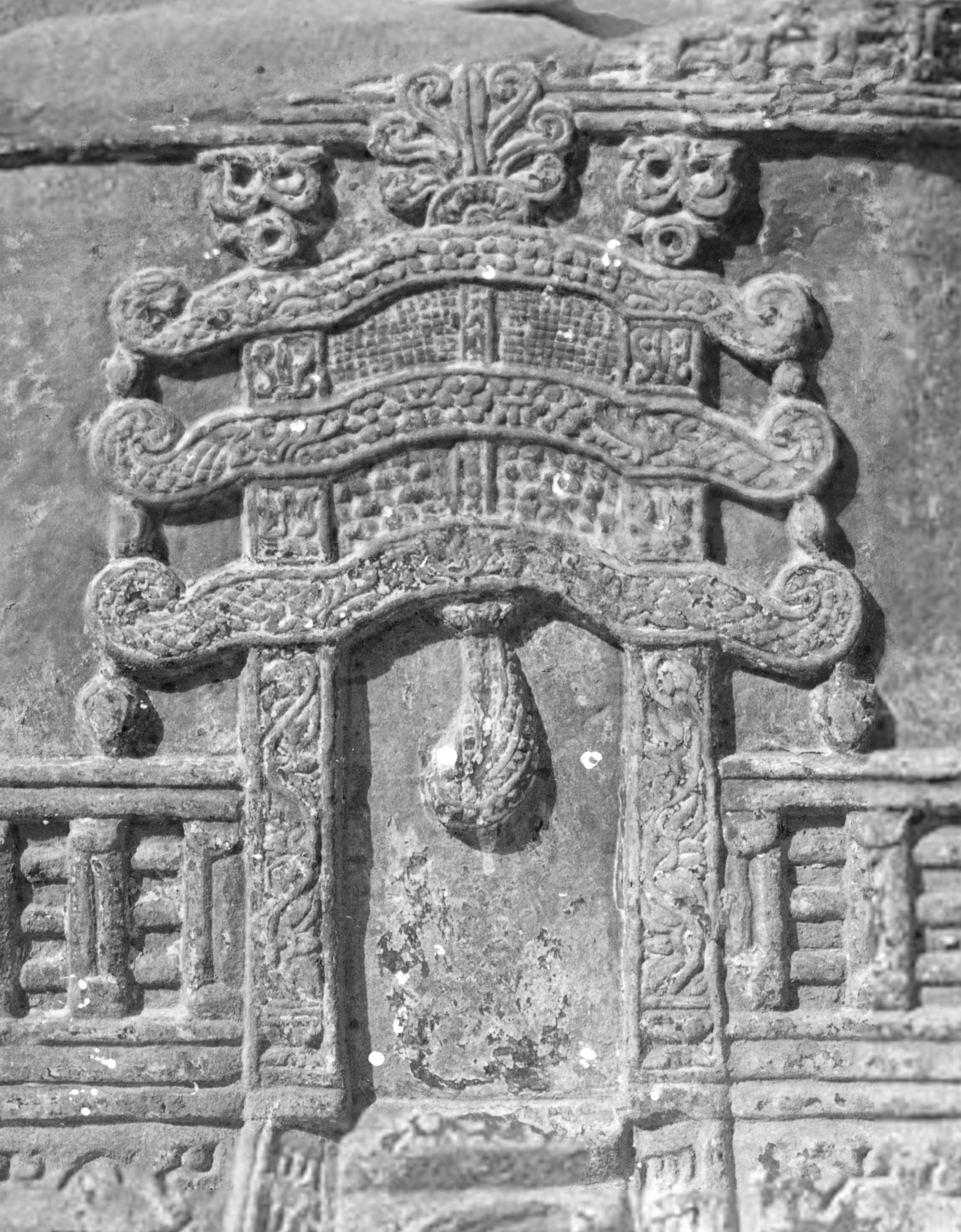
Jain torana with triratna symbols and flame palmette designs on top.

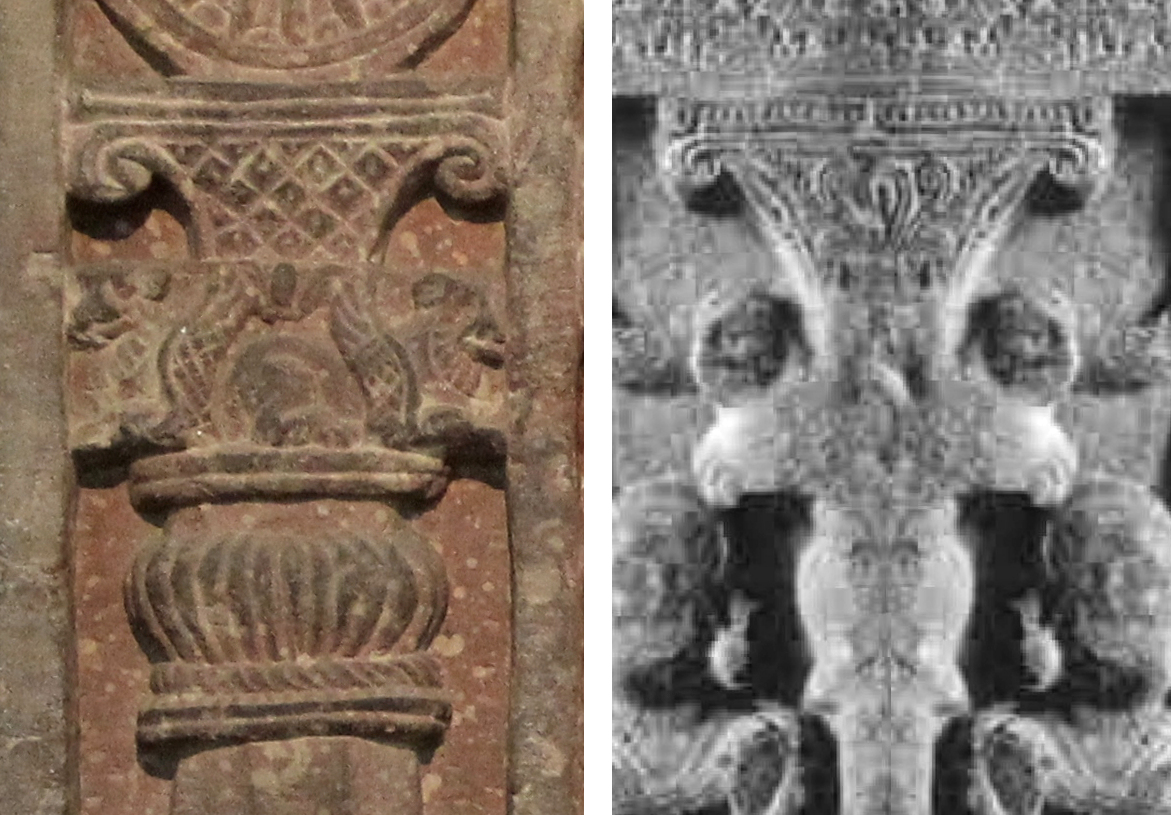
"Persian Achaemenian" style capitals appearing in ayagapatas, Mathura, 15-50 CE.

== Jain stupas in narrative reliefs ==
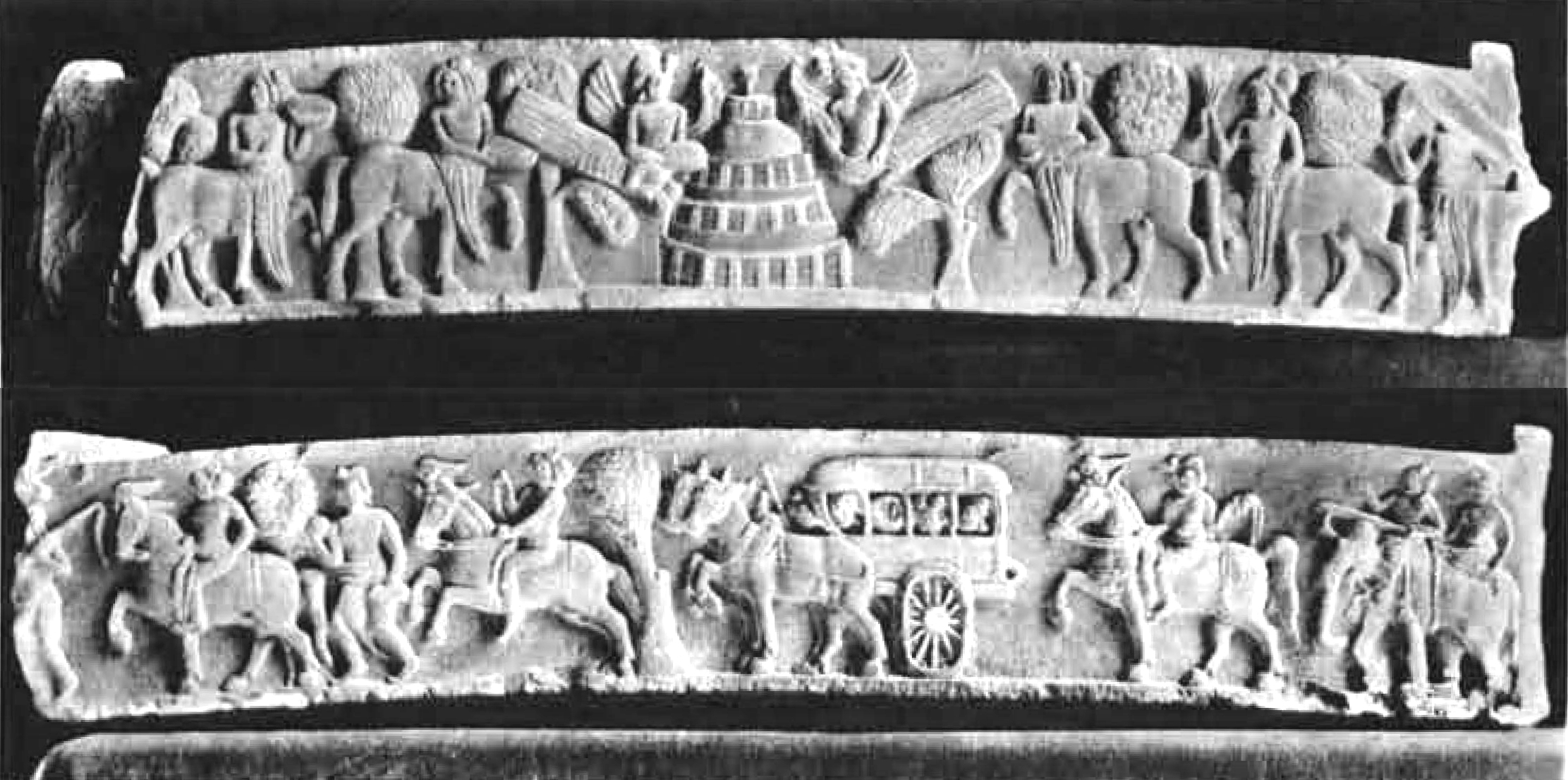
Kankali Tila architrave with Gandharva or Centaurs worshipping a Jain Stupa, Mathura, circa 100 BCE

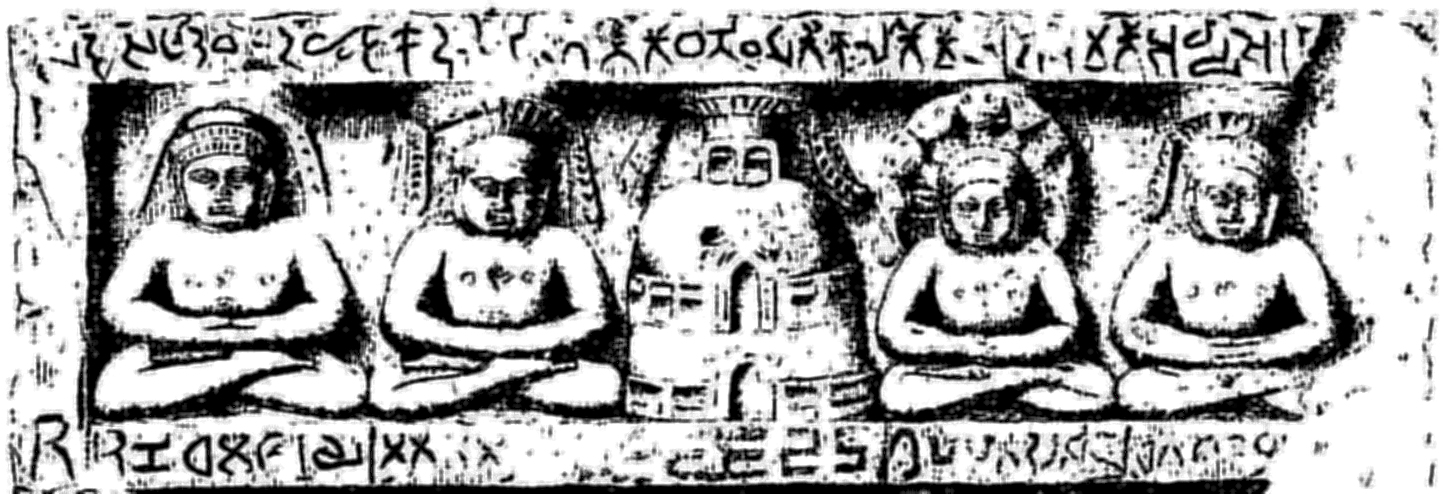
Sculpture from the Mathura archaeological site (Kankali Tila) that depicts the last four Tirthankaras around a stupa, c. 51 CE.

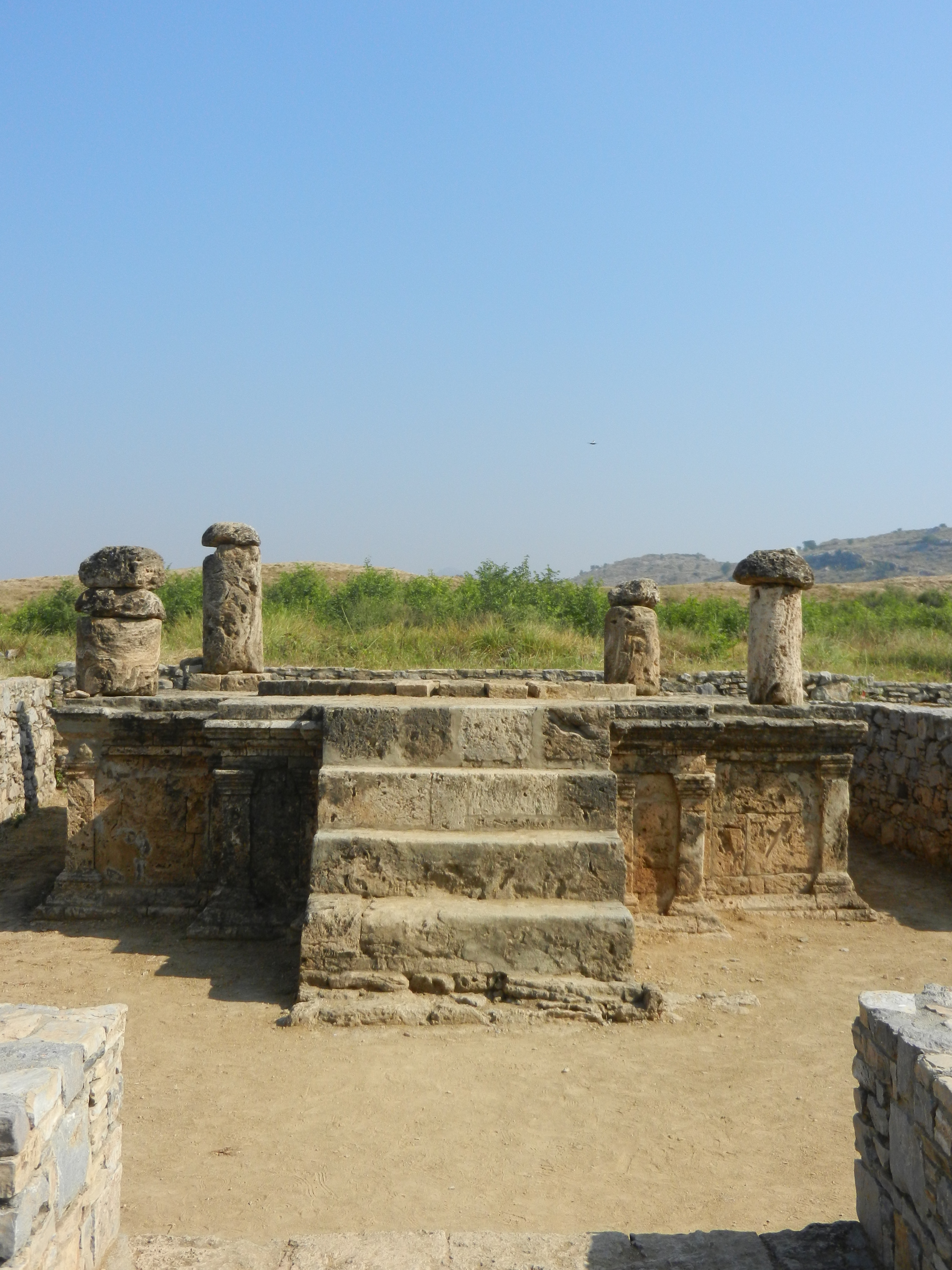
Platform of a Jain Stupa at Sirkap, near Taxila.

By 100 BCE, a relief from Mathura is known, the Kankali Tila architrave, representing centaurs worshipping a Jain stupa.

Here again the Jain stupa in the middle of the relief is of cylindrical type with a three-tier design, separated by three horizontal railings.

These reliefs are among the first known examples of Jain sculpture. The centaurs appearing in the Mathura reliefs, as in other places such as Bodh Gaya, are generally considered as Western borrowings. Robert Graves (relying on the work of Georges Dumézil, who argued for tracing the centaurs back to the Indian Gandharva), speculated that the centaurs were a dimly remembered, pre-Hellenic fraternal earth cult who had the horse as a totem.

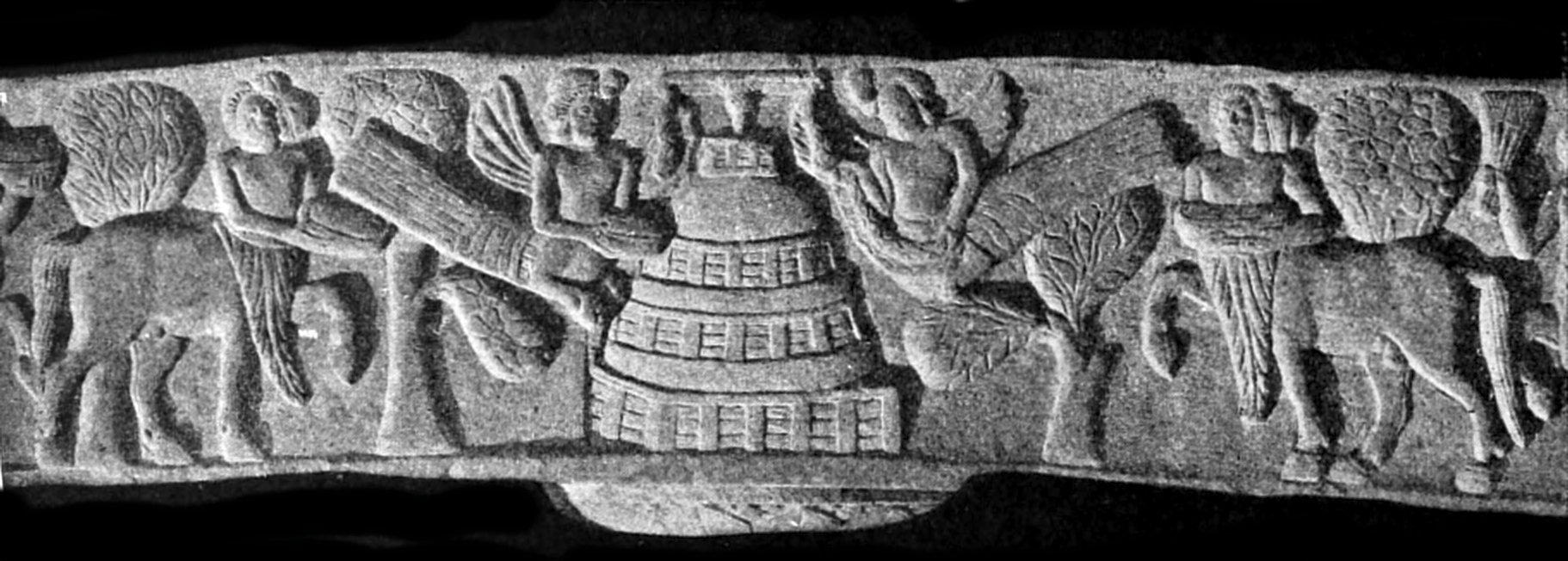
Jain stupa worshipped by "Kinnaras" and Gandharva or Centaurs, Mathura, circa 100 BCE.

== See also ==
- Jain temple
- Vaddamanu
