= Stone palette =

Round tray with Greek mythological scenes

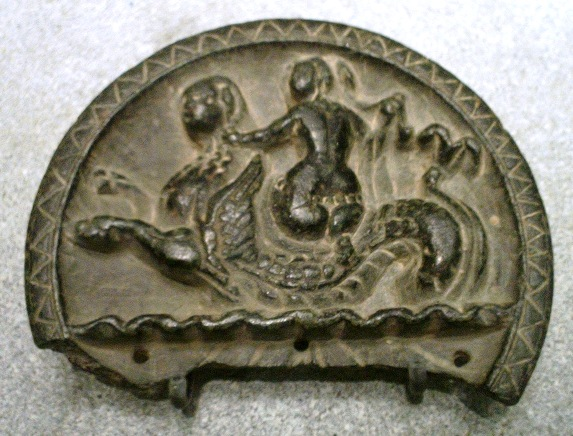
Indo-Greek stone palette representing an Hellenistic Nereid goddess riding a Ketos sea-monster, 2nd century BCE, Sirkap.

A stone palette (also called a toilet tray) is a round tray commonly found in the areas of Bactria and Gandhara, and which usually represent Greek mythological scenes. Some of them are attributed to the Indo-Greek period in the 2nd and 1st century BCE (a few were retrieved from the Indo-Greek stratum No.5 at Sirkap.) Many are considered to be of later production, around the 1st century CE during the time of the Indo-Parthians. They practically disappeared after the 1st century. Many have been found at the archaeological site of Sirkap, in today's Pakistan.

== Function ==
Scholars have suggested that these trays were used to mix cosmetic products (cf. ancient Egyptian cosmetic palettes). The Ancient Orient Museum was able to analyse the remains of substances adhering to a number of stone palettes, which turned out to be colored cosmetic powders akin to blush. A frieze discovered in Butkara shows a woman using a mirror as she puts her fingers into one of these stone palettes.

These stone palettes provide an interesting instance of Hellenistic art in the northwestern Indian subcontinent. They are disconnected from the Buddhist narrative to which works are usually associated in the Greco-Buddhist art of Gandhara.

Few of the palettes contain representations of the Buddha.

== Crescent-shaped divided bowl ==
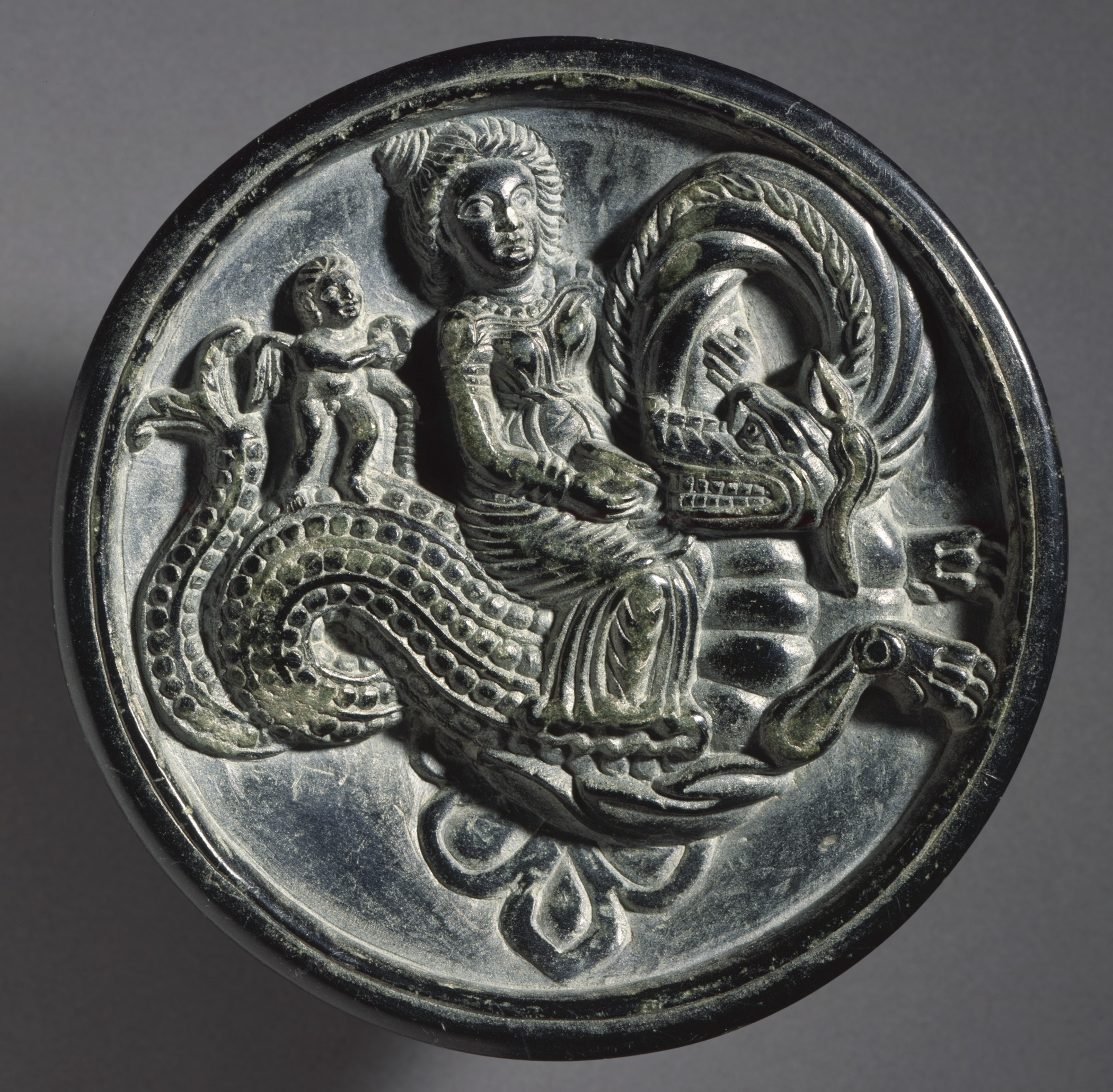
Nereid and a Cherub riding a Sea Monster (Ketos).

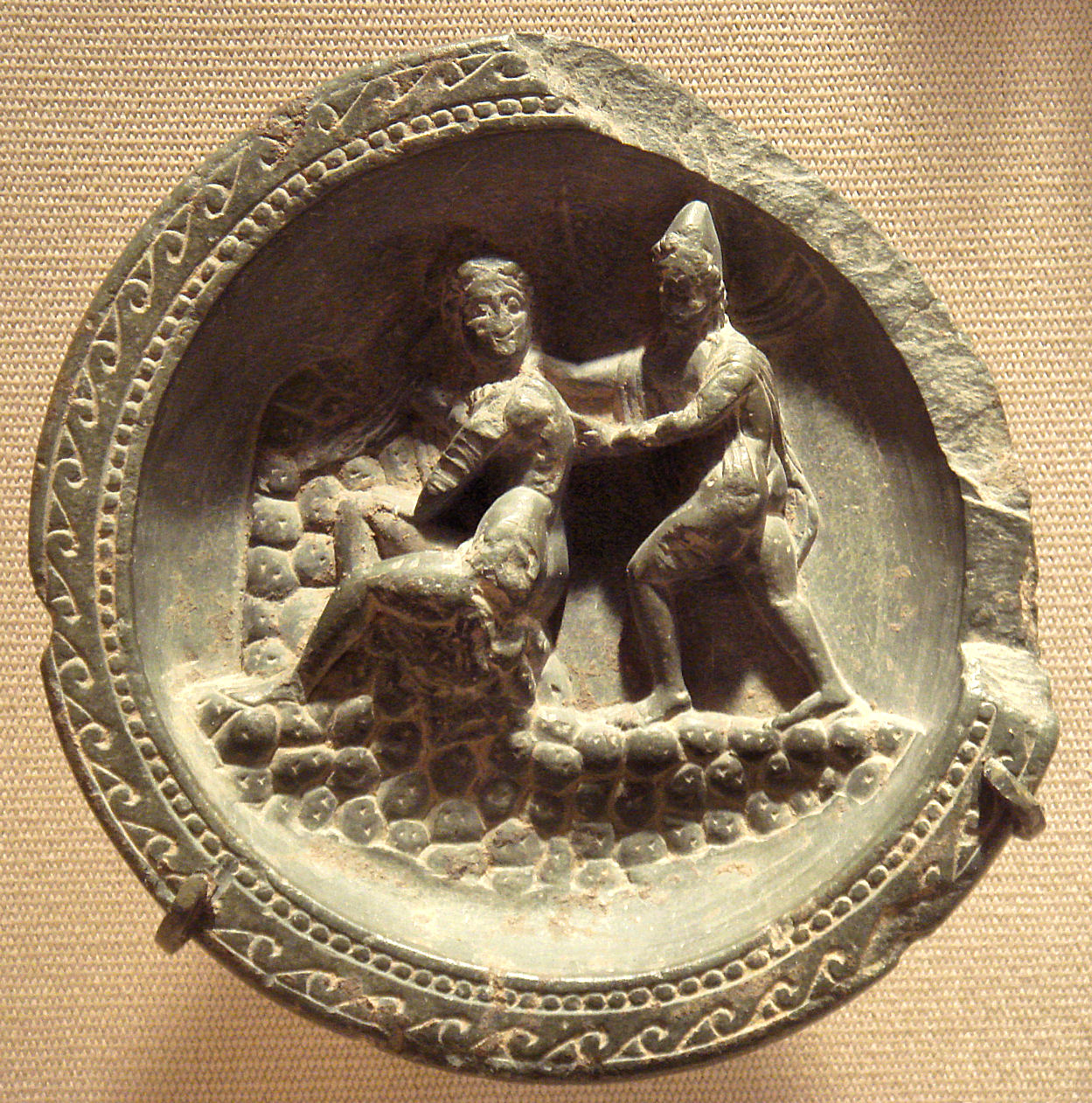
Apollo and Daphne.

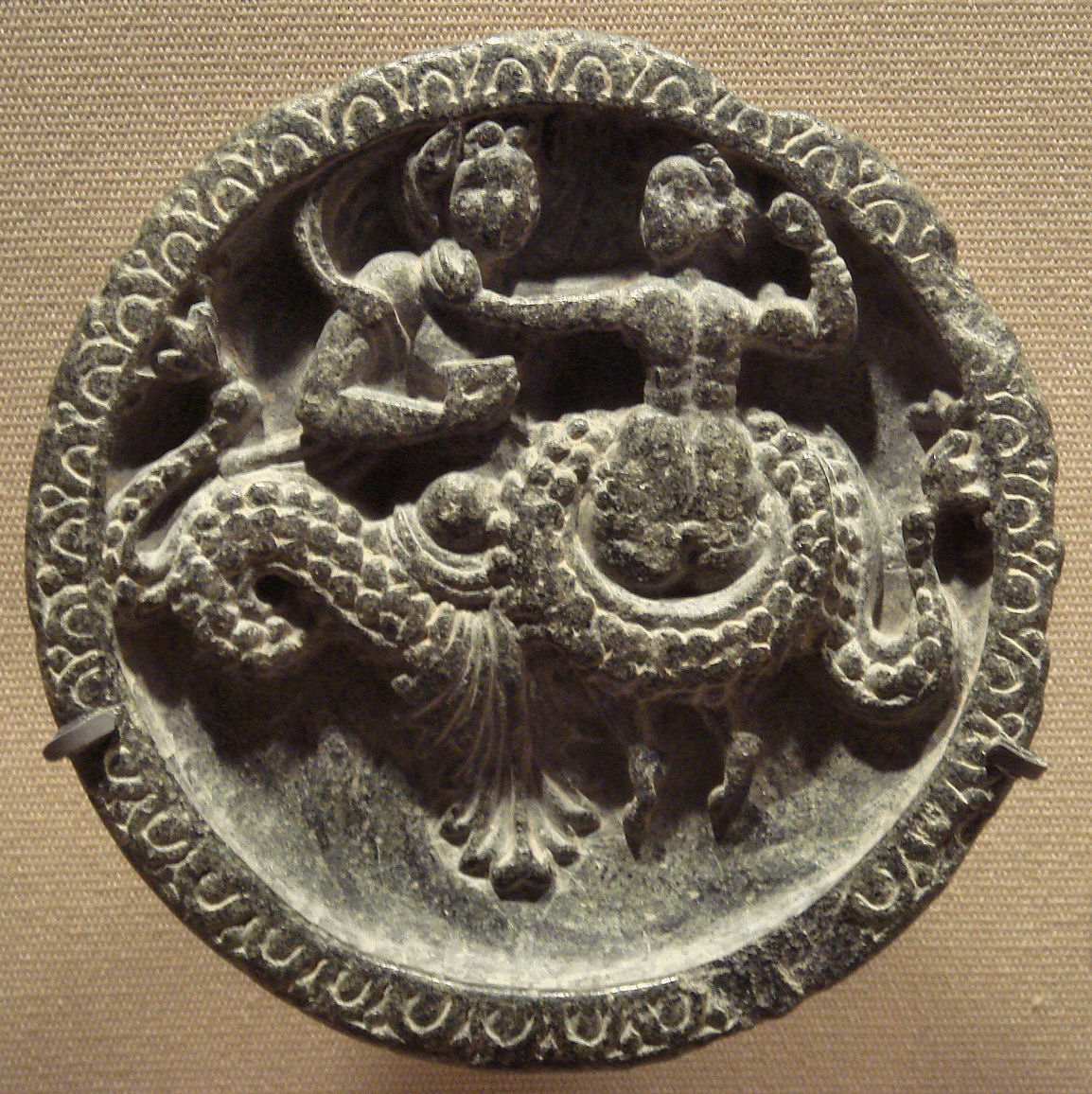
Couple with sea serpent.

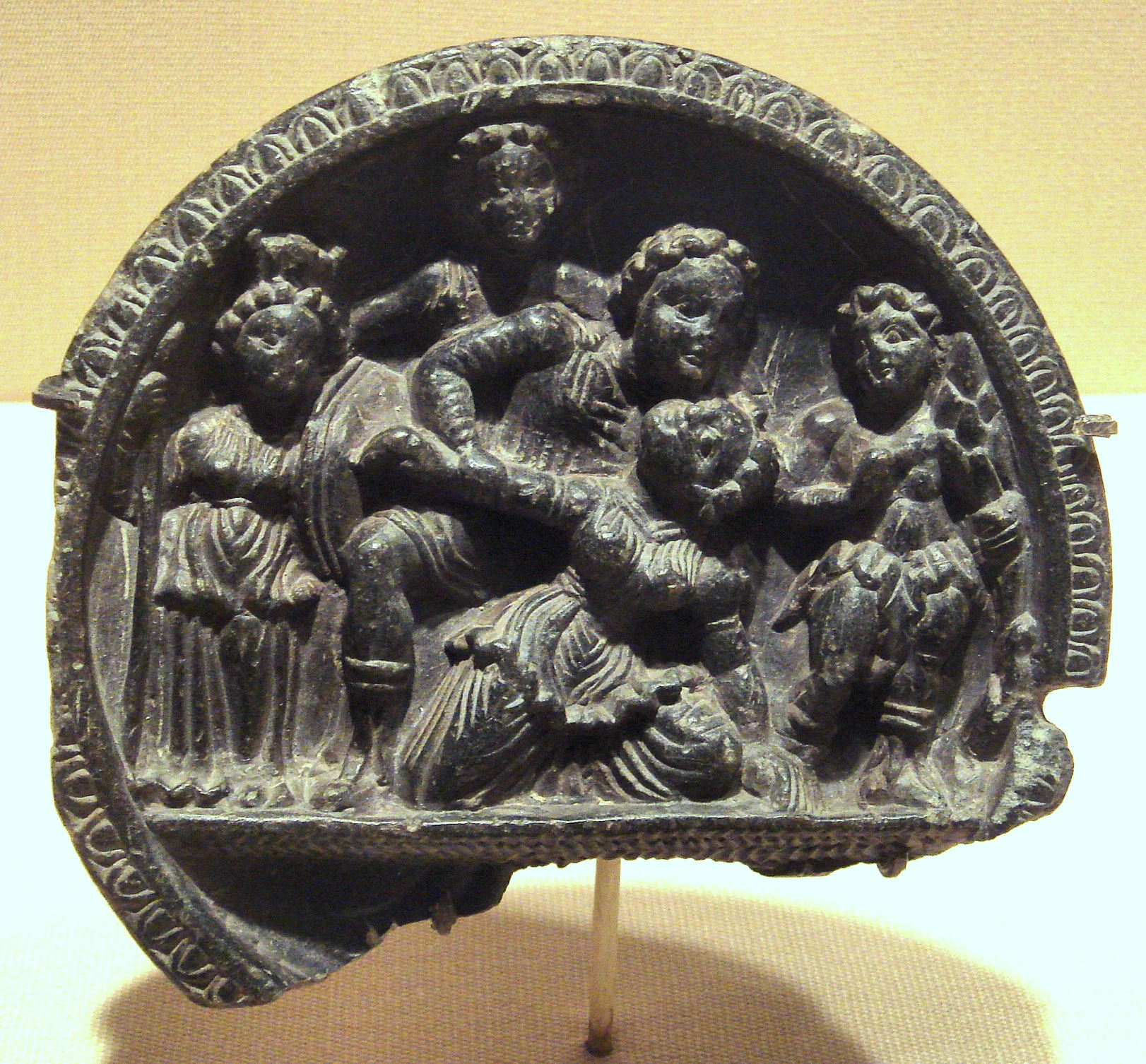
Mythological scene with Athena and Herakles.

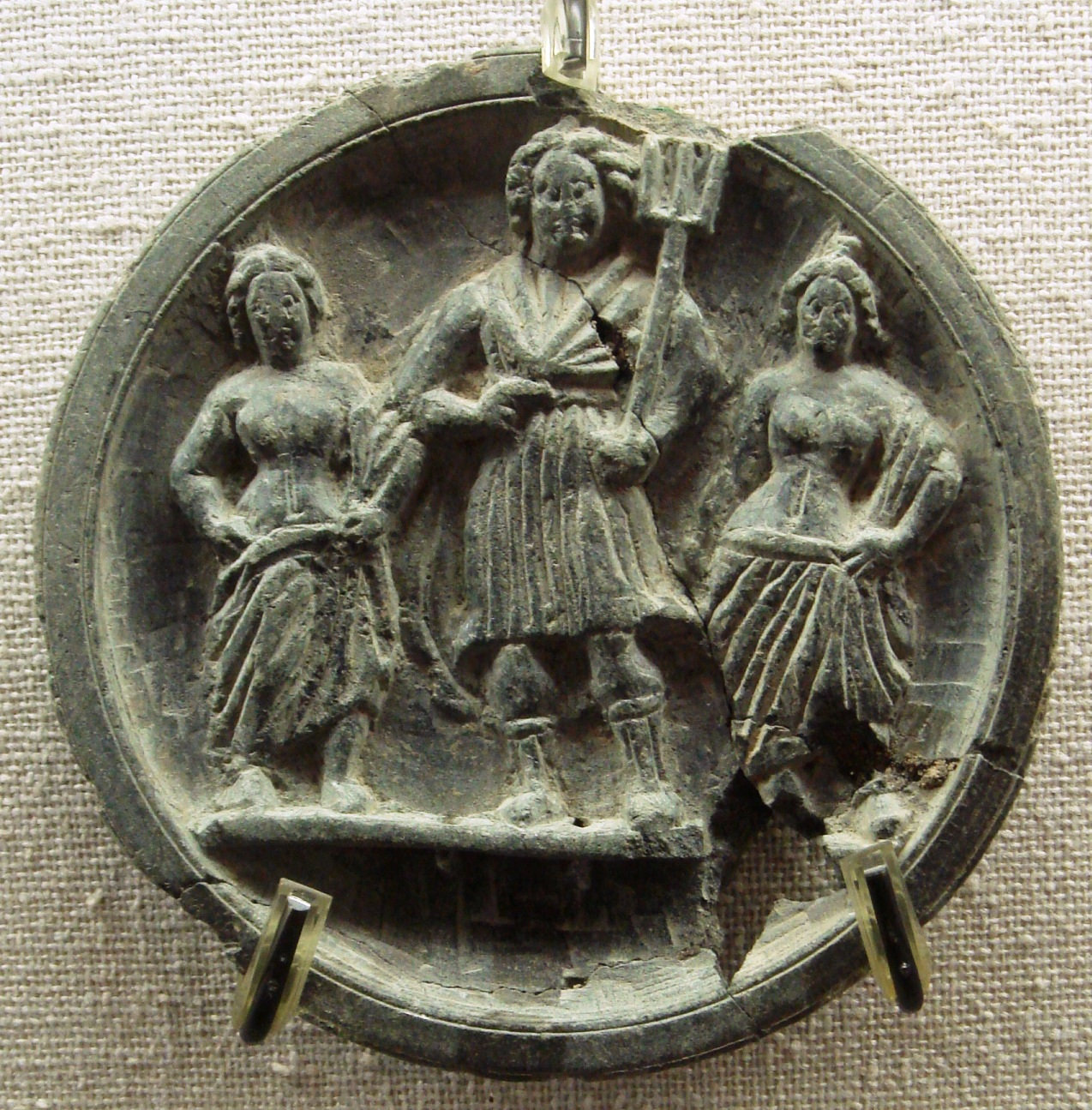
Poseidon with attendants. Ancient Orient Museum.

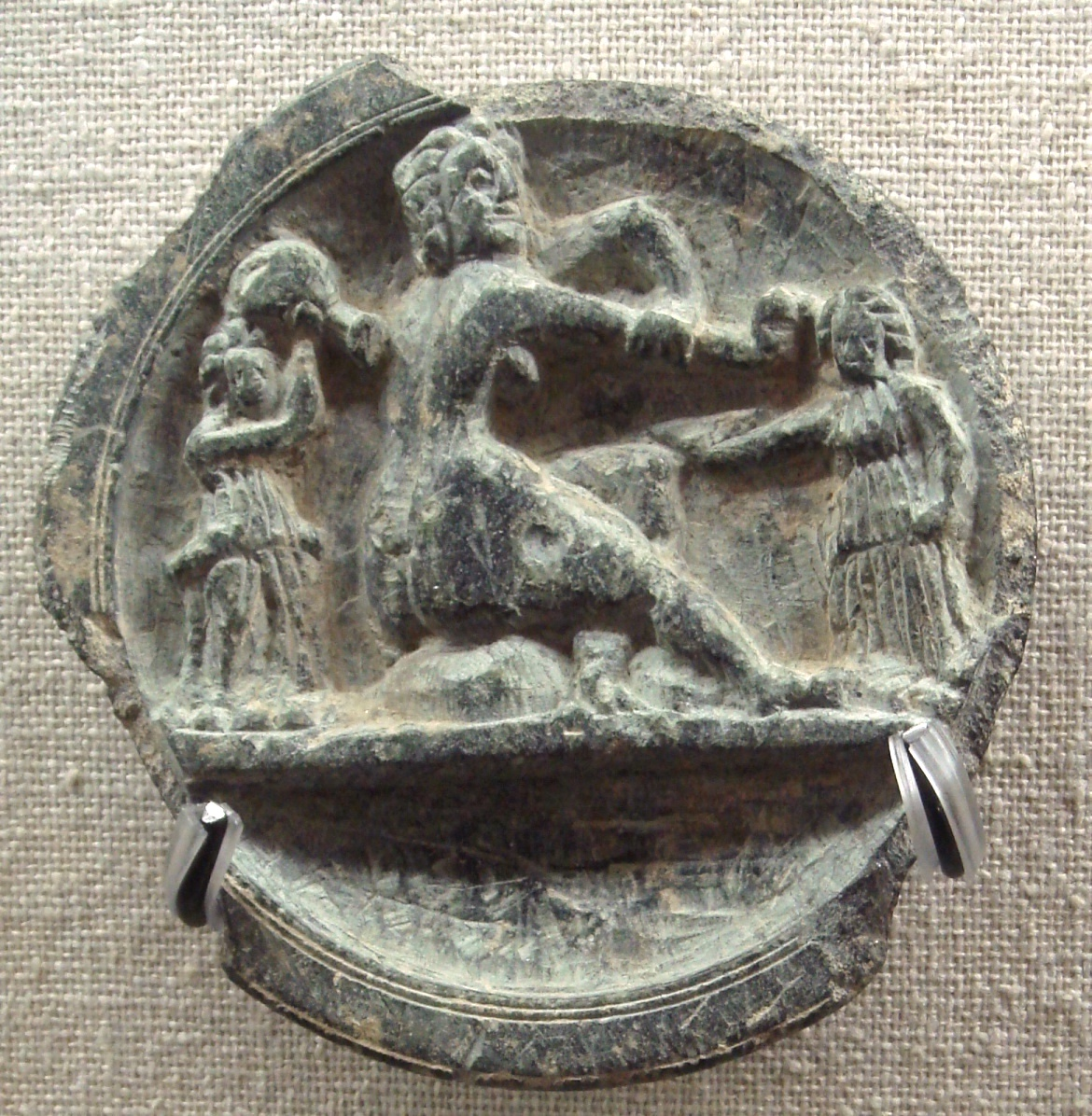
Aphrodite at her bath.

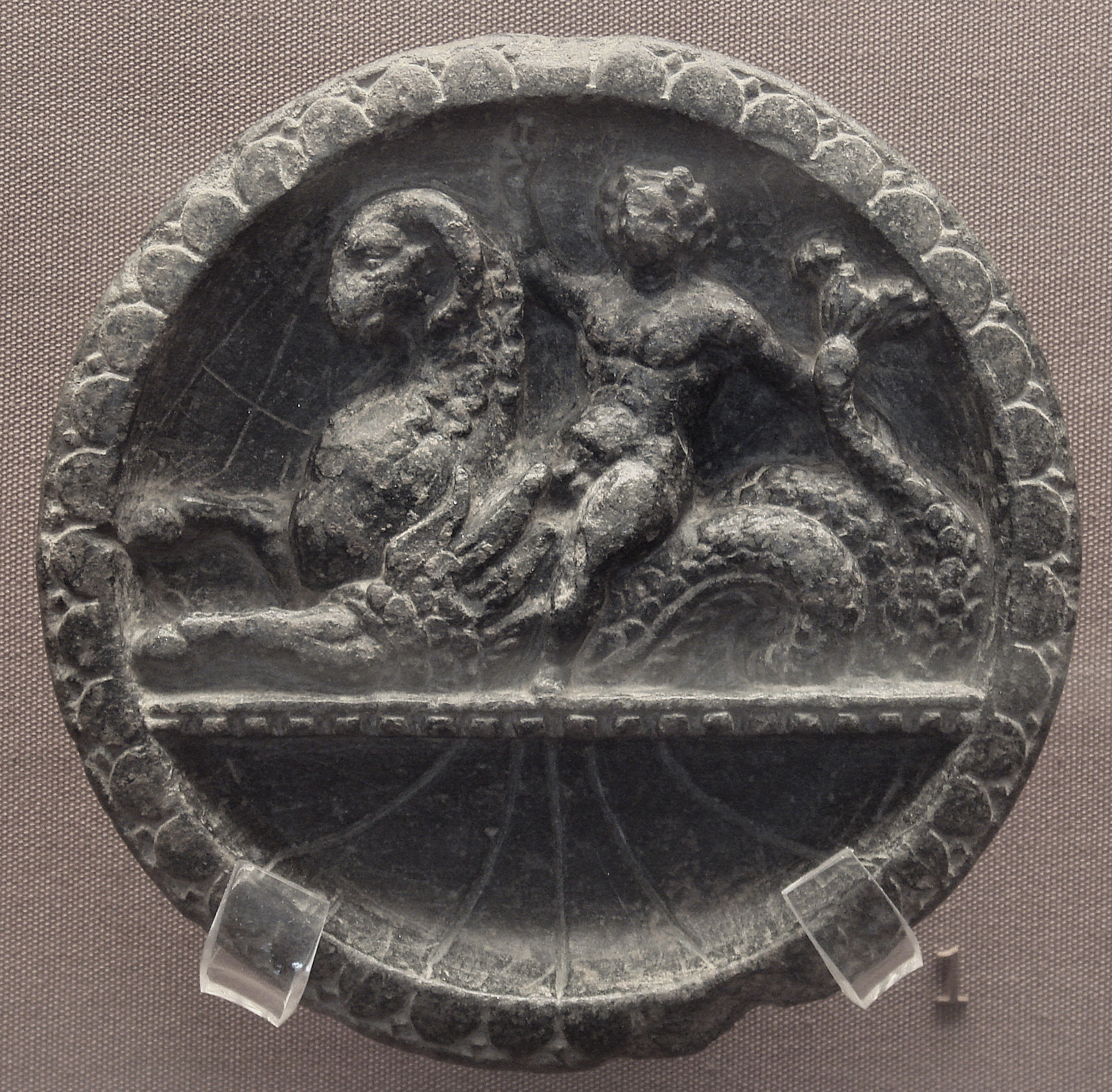
Man with cup in hand, riding a Ketos sea-monster.

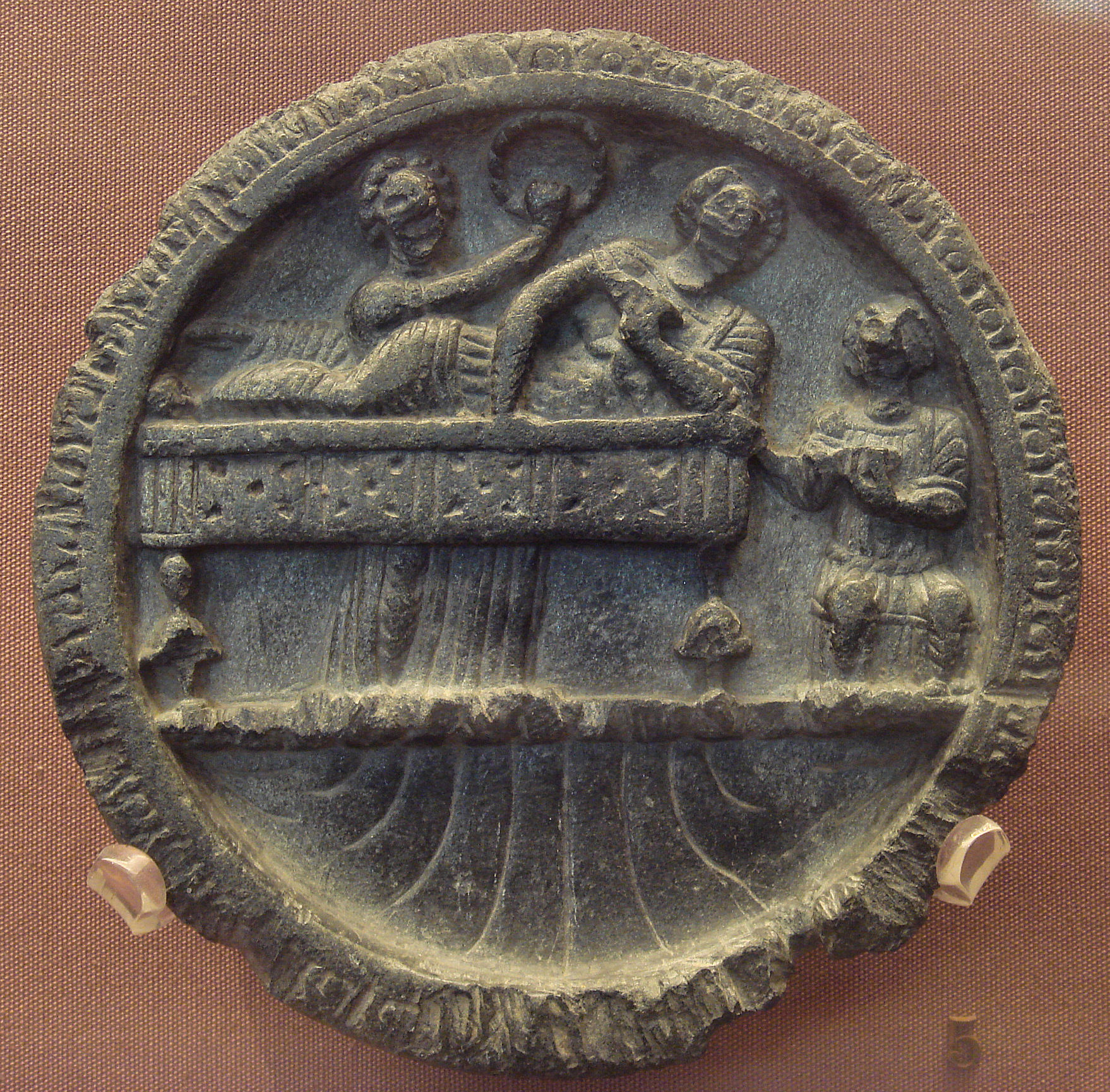
Banquet or funerary scene.

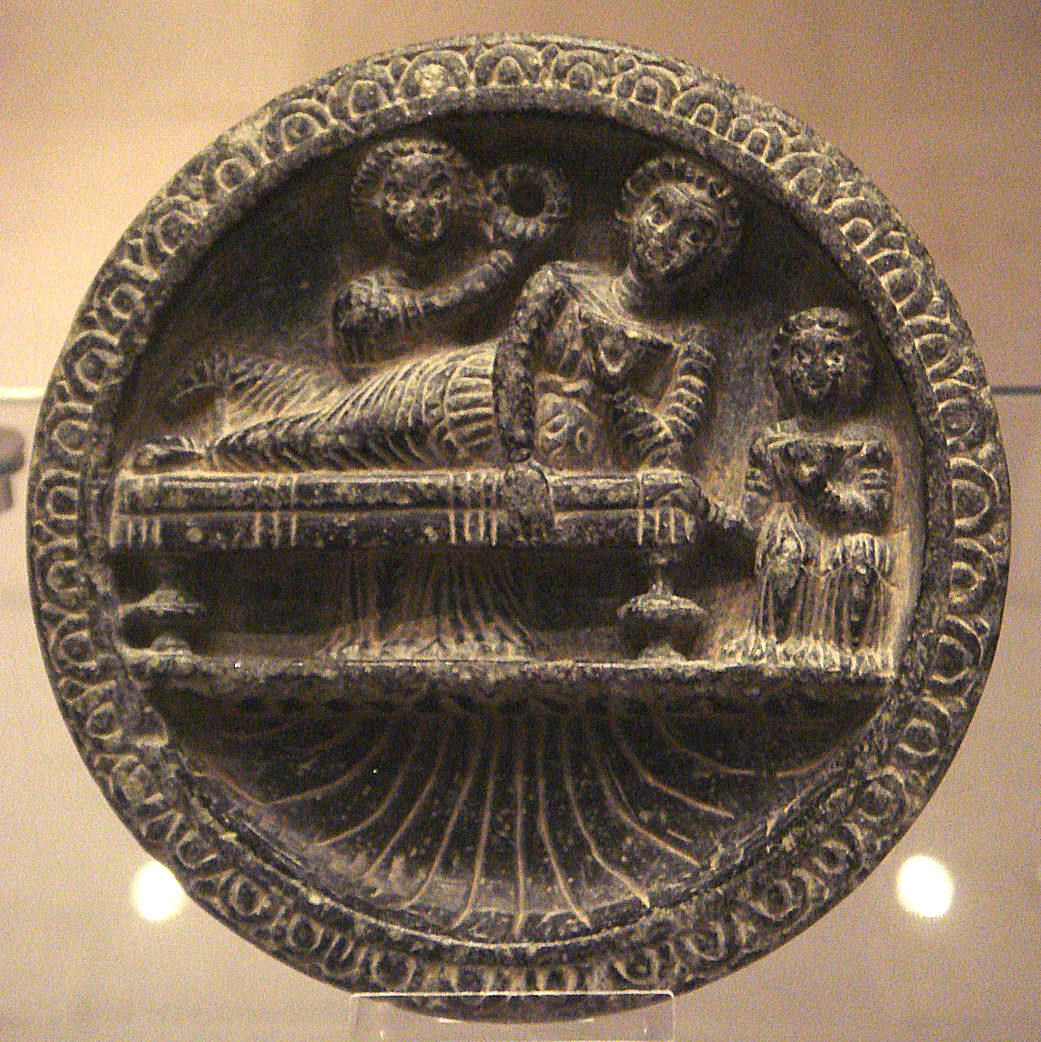
Banquet or funerary scene.

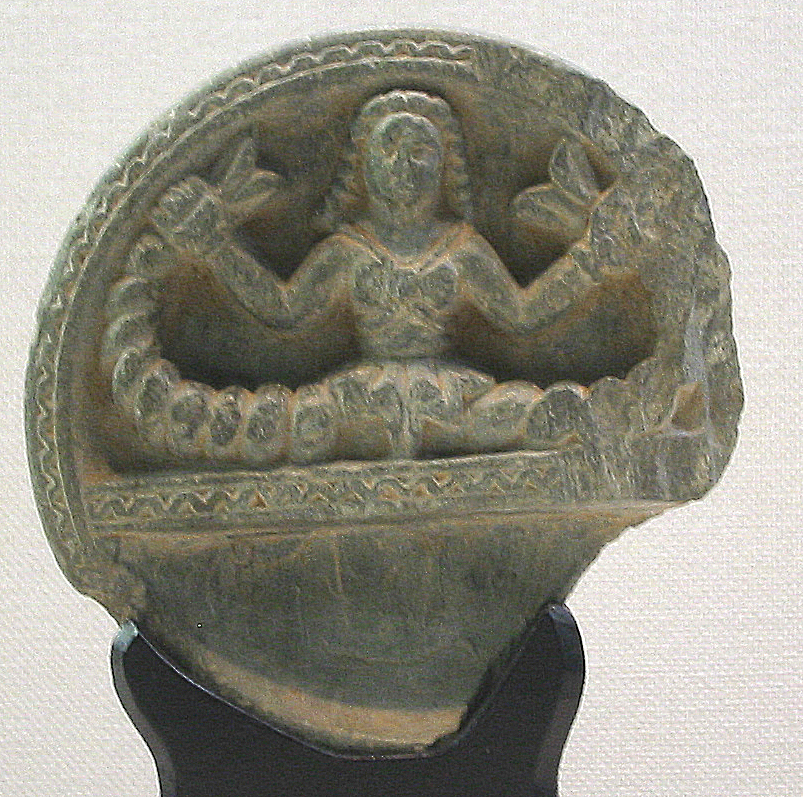
Female triton, Tokyo National Museum

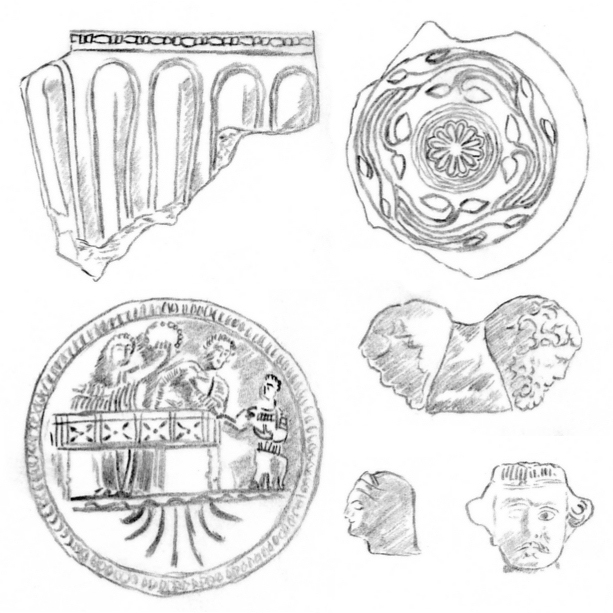
Stone palette and other artifacts found in the Indo-Greek level at Sirkap (Stratum 5)

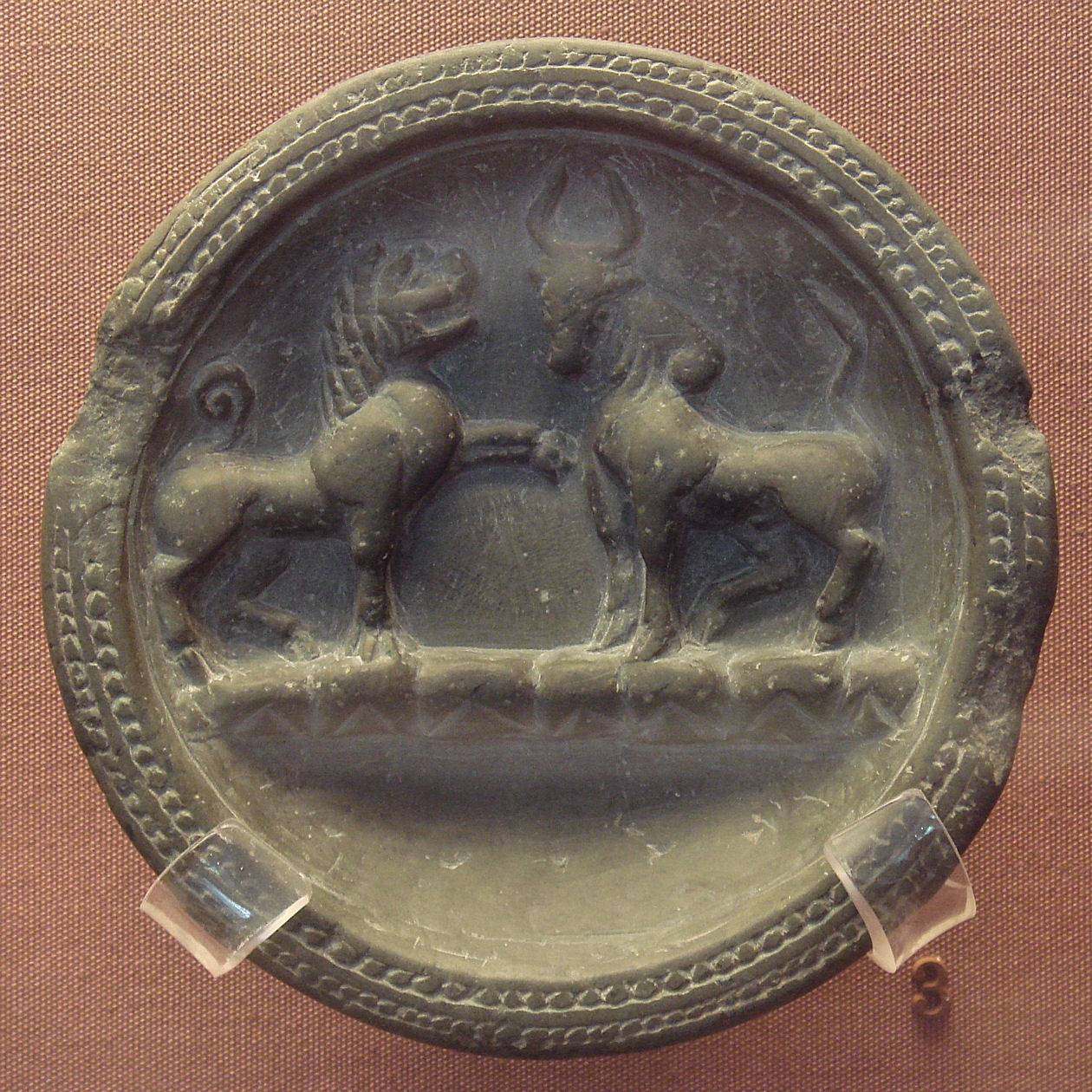
Friendly animals.

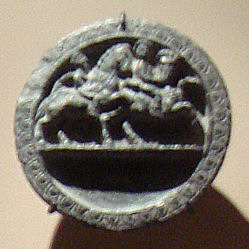
Equestrian stone palette, Gandhara.

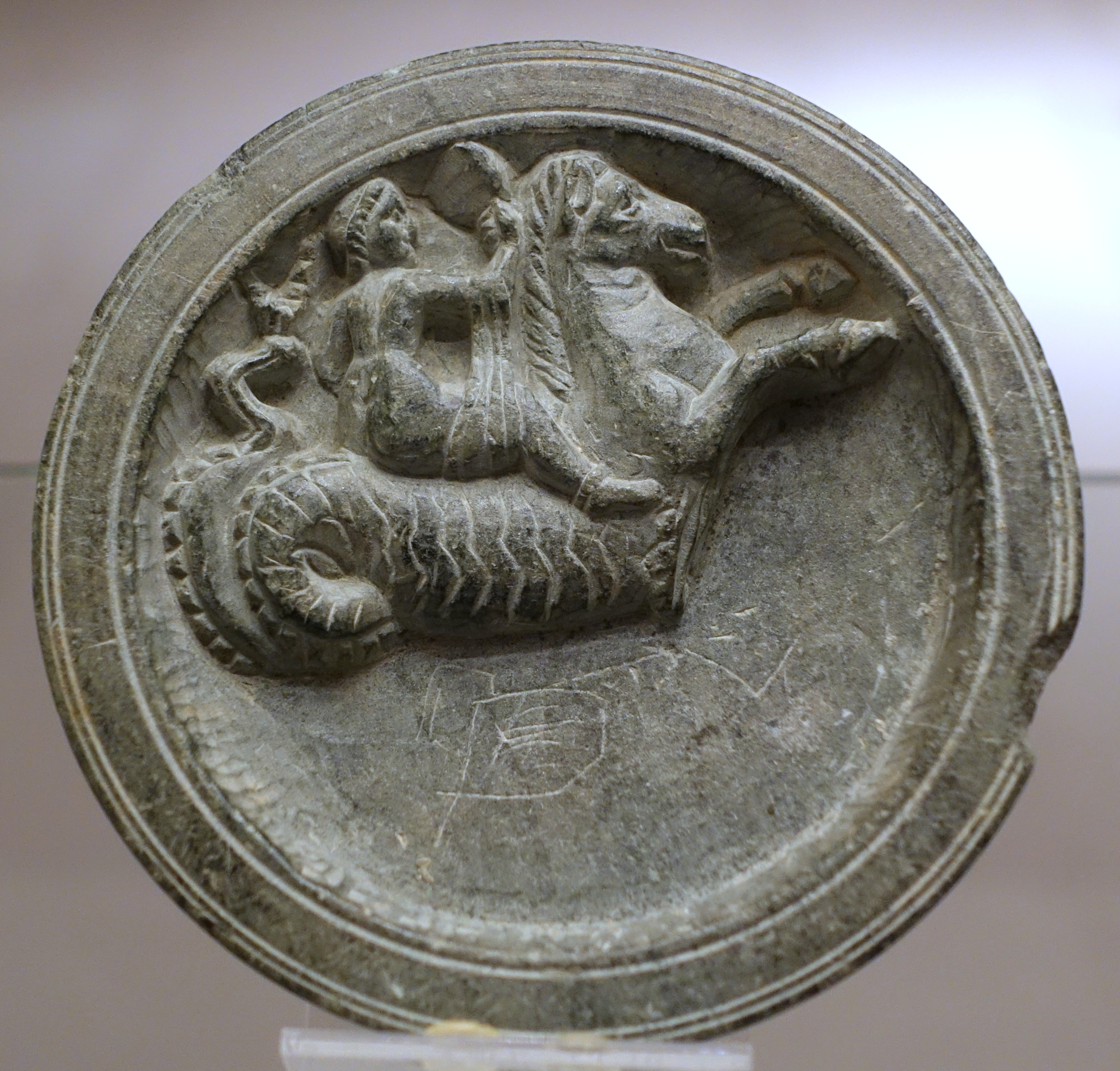
Tray showing Nereid riding a mythical sea monster.

== T-shape dividers ==
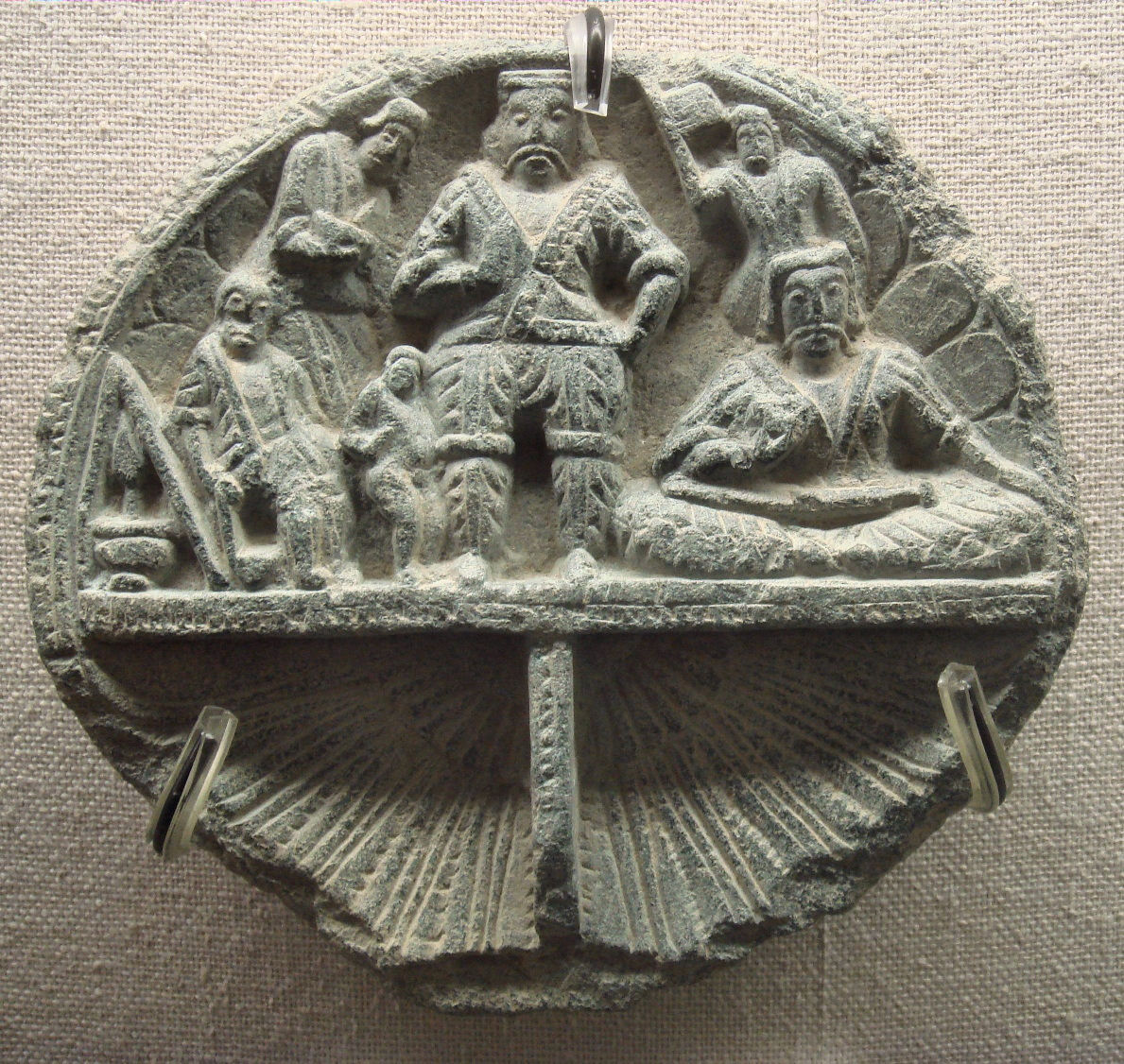
Indo-Parthian king and attendants.

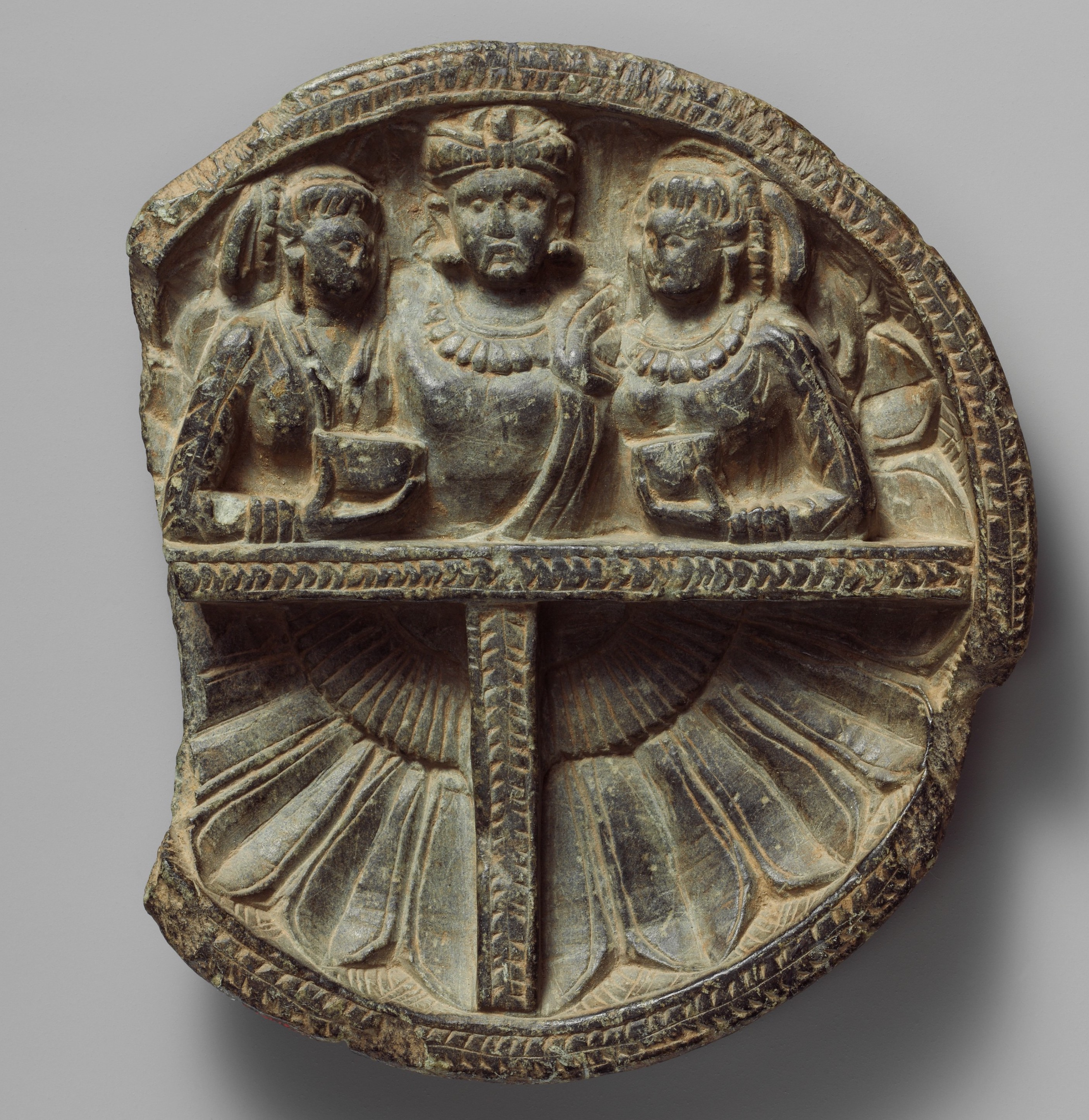
Indian nobleman with female attendants.

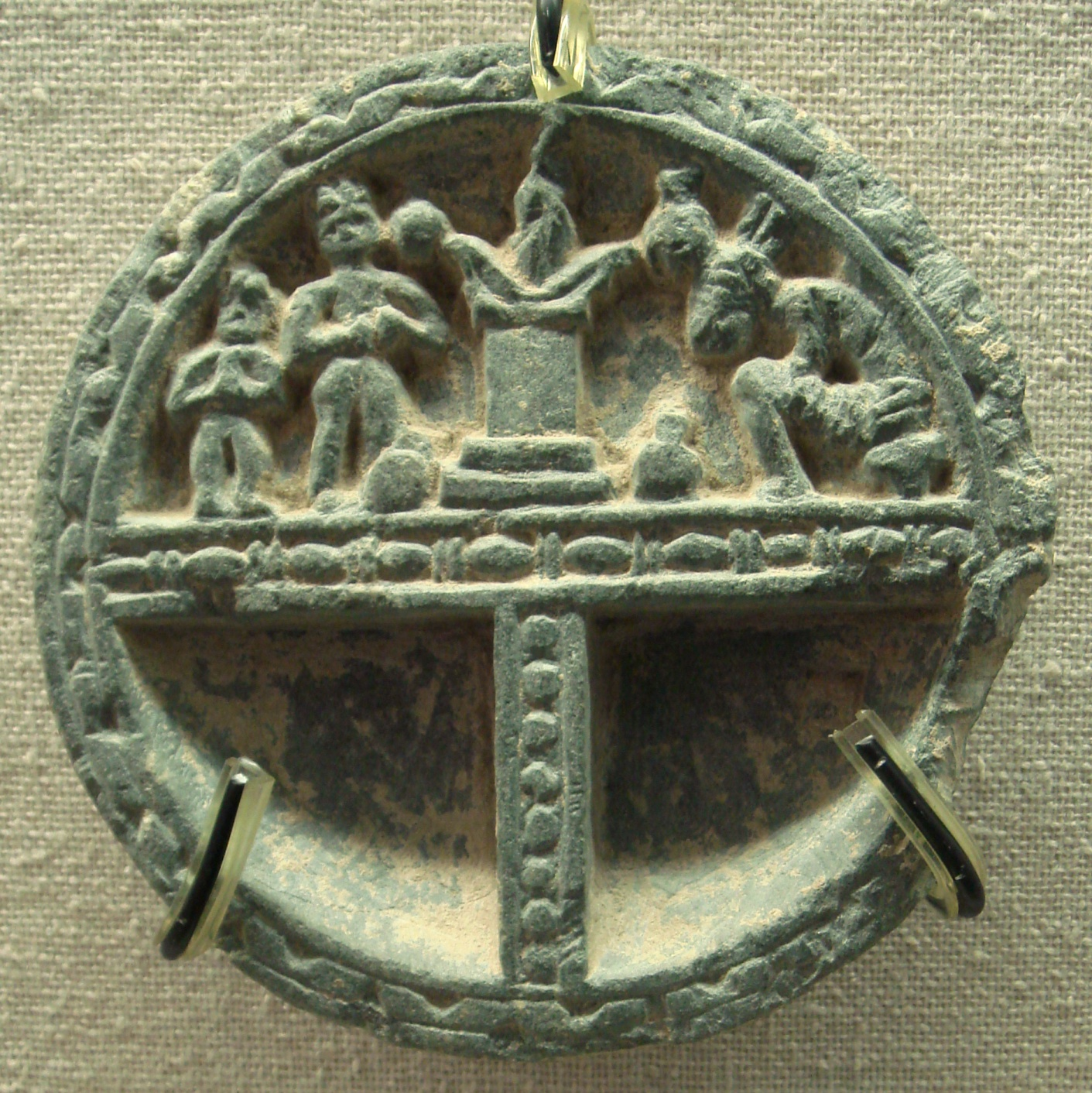
Possible fire worship with altar.

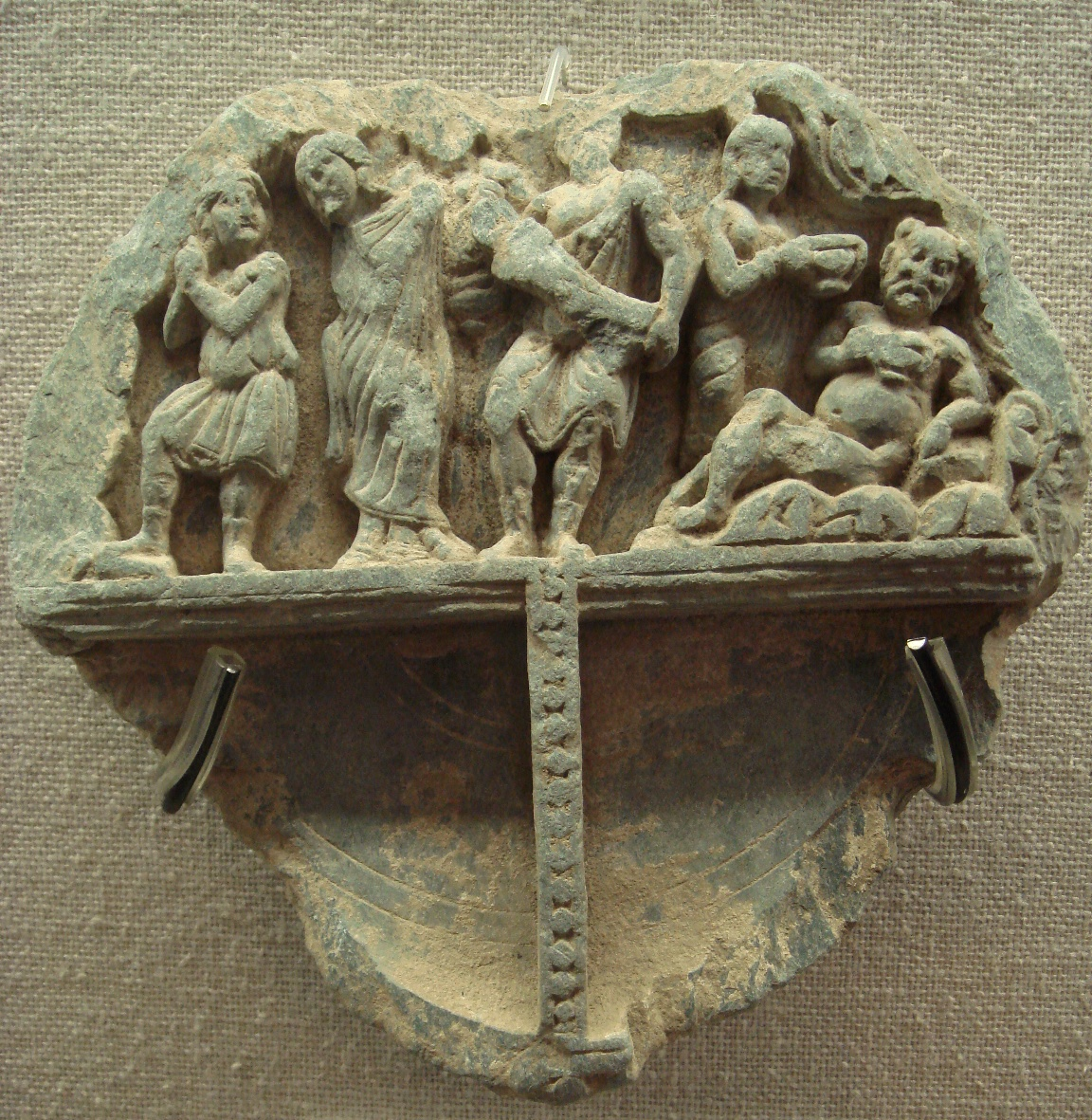
Indo-Greek drinking party.

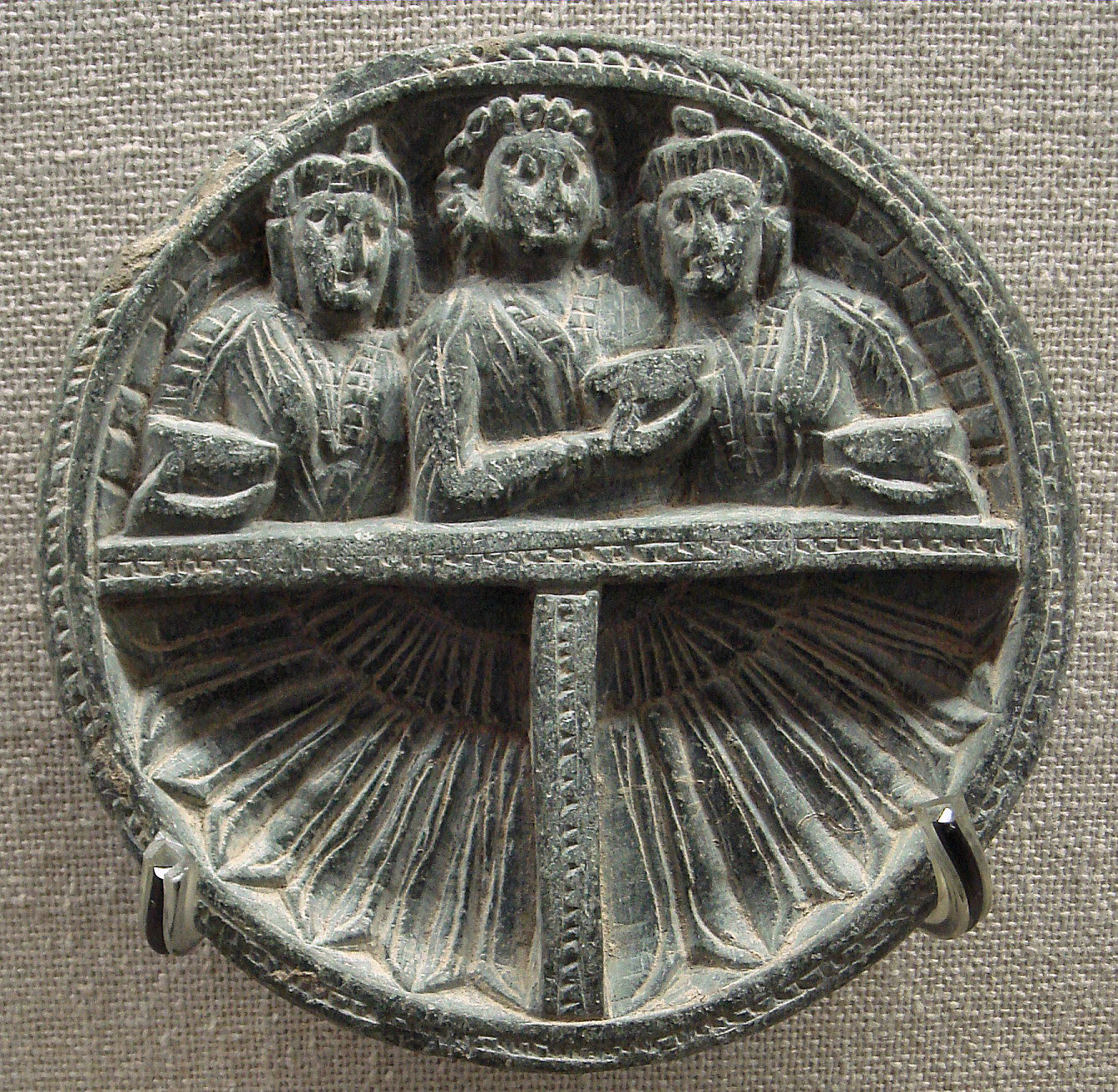
Indo-Parthian revelers.

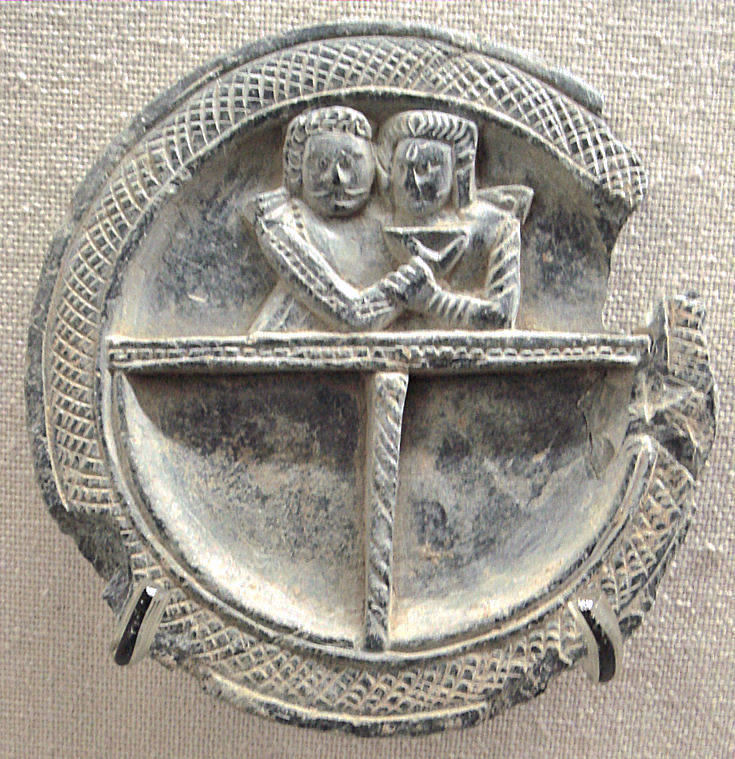
Indo-Parthian couple.

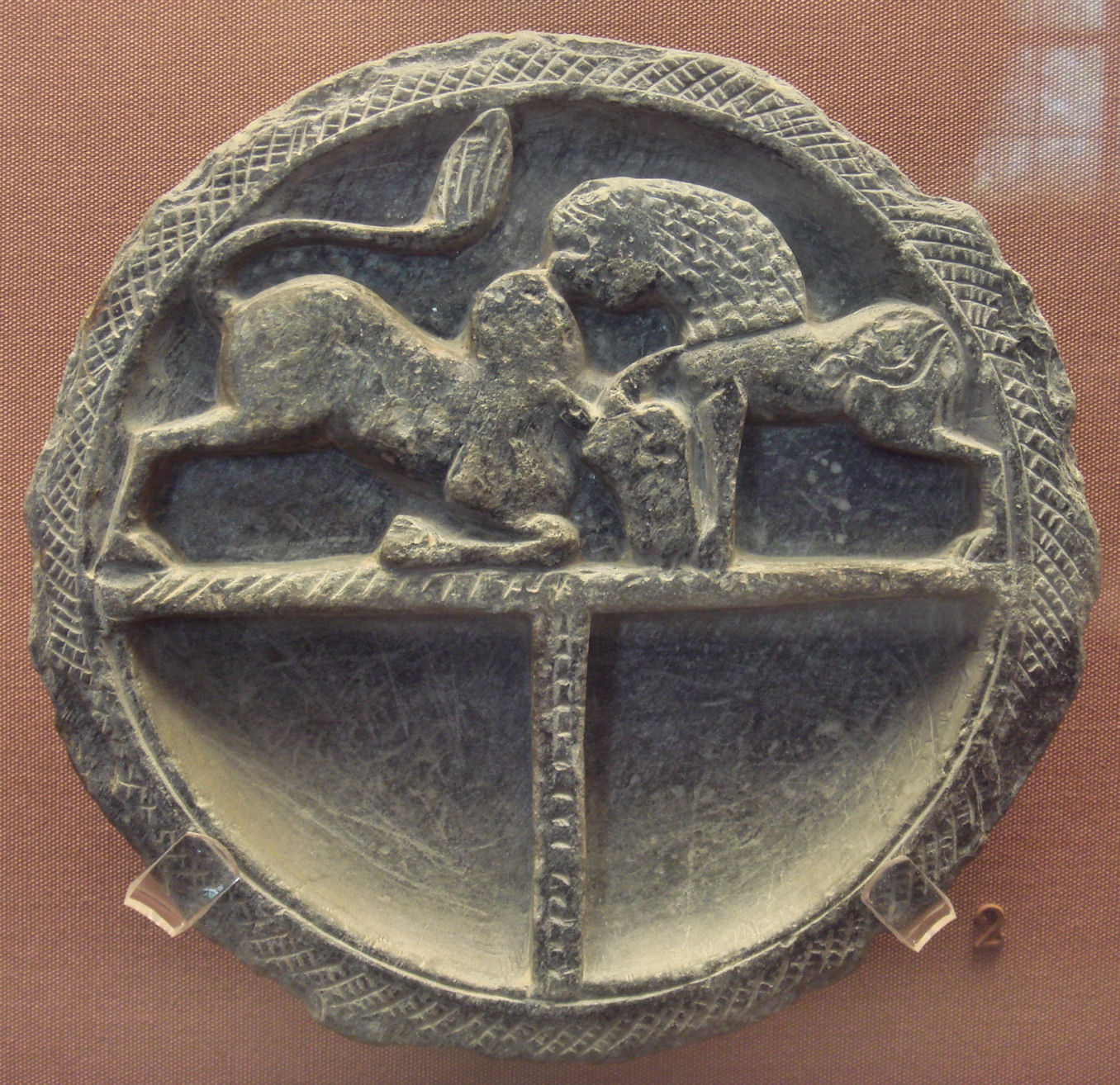
Fighting animals.

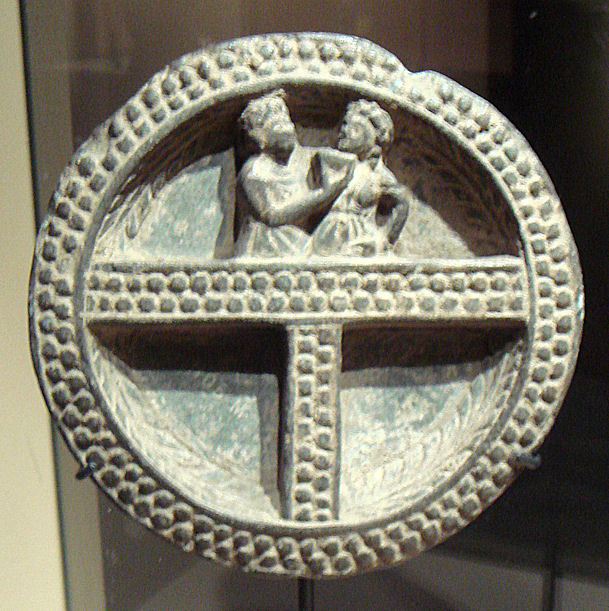
Reveling couple.

== Other shapes ==
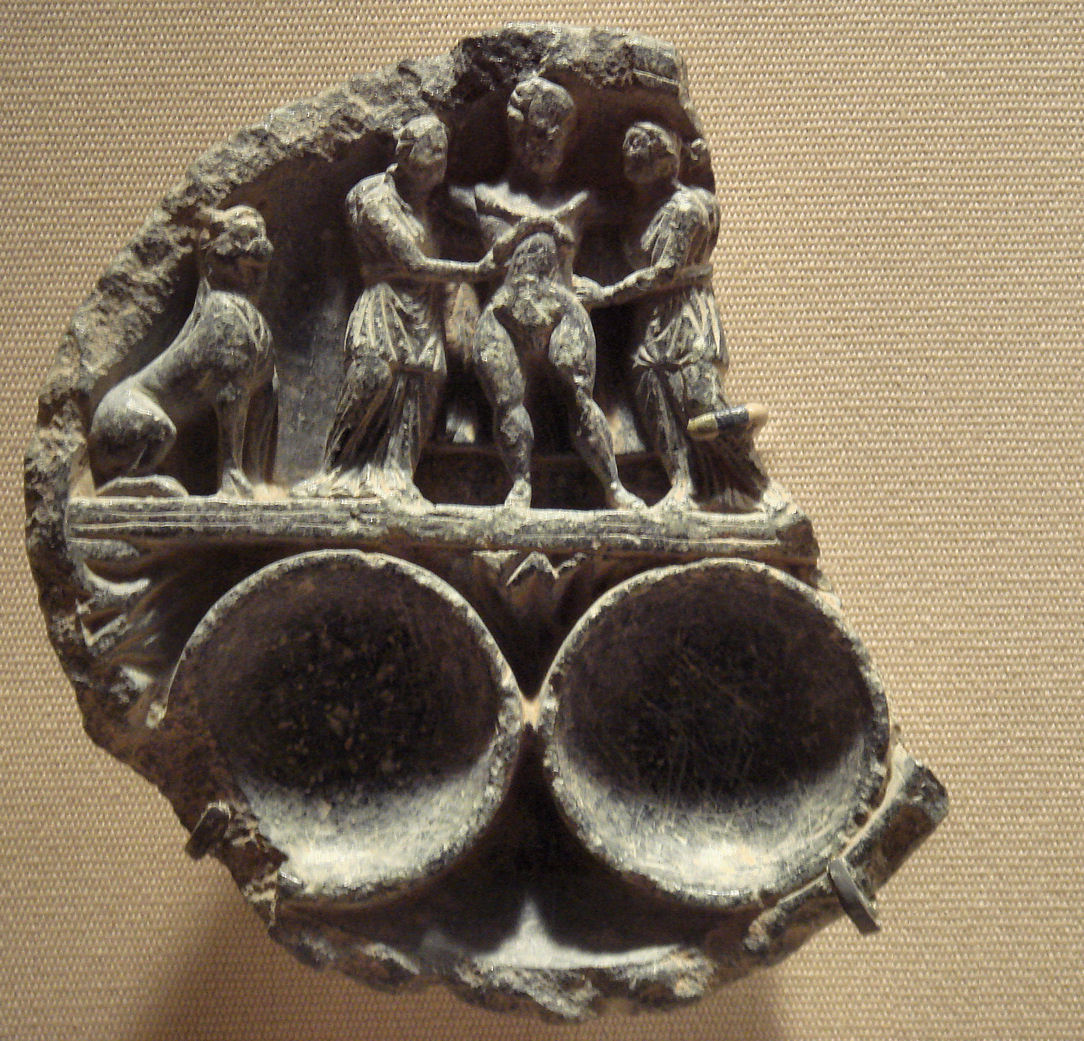
Drunk Herakles.

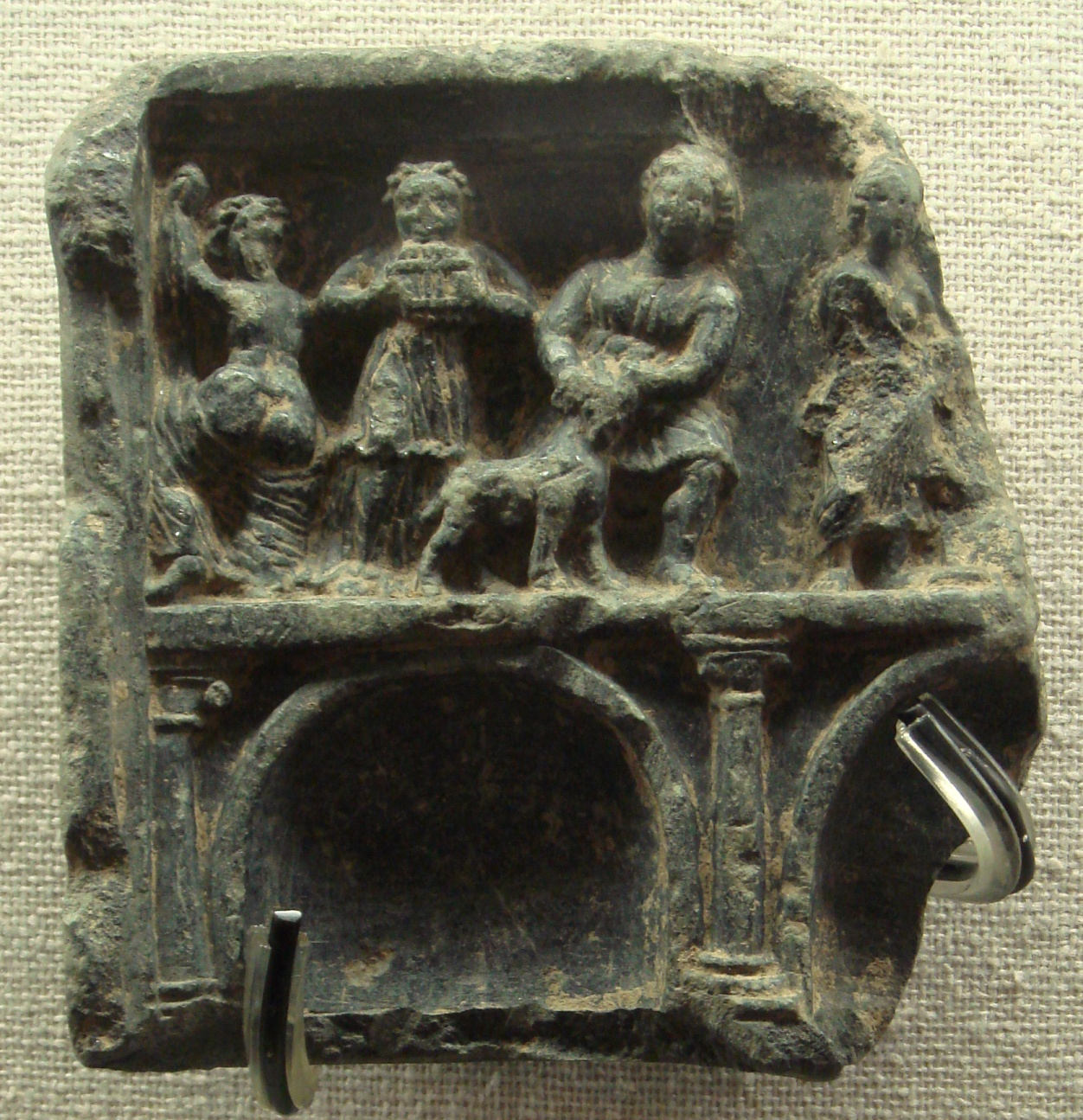
Indo-Greek festivities.

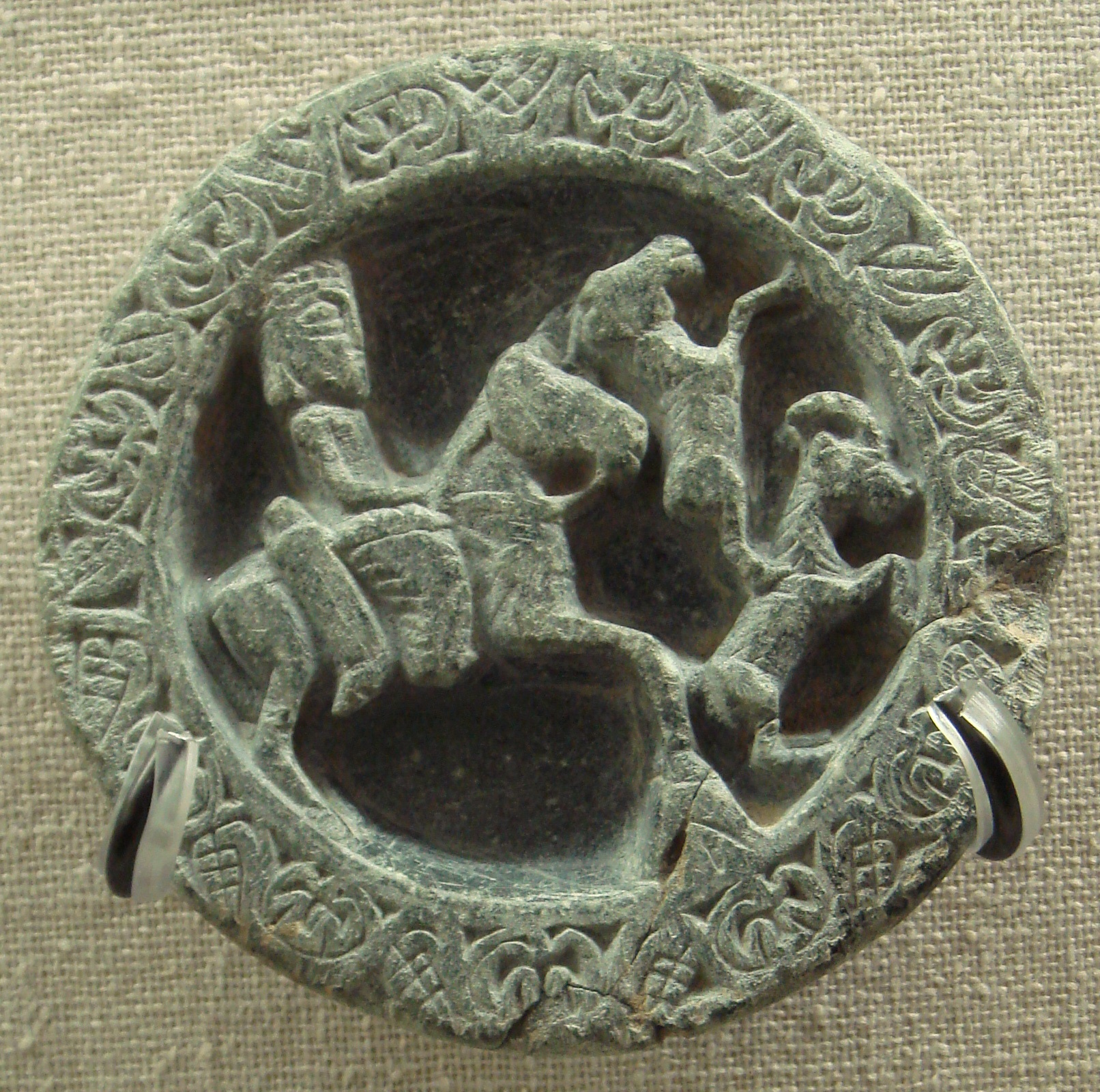
Indo-Parthian man hunting.

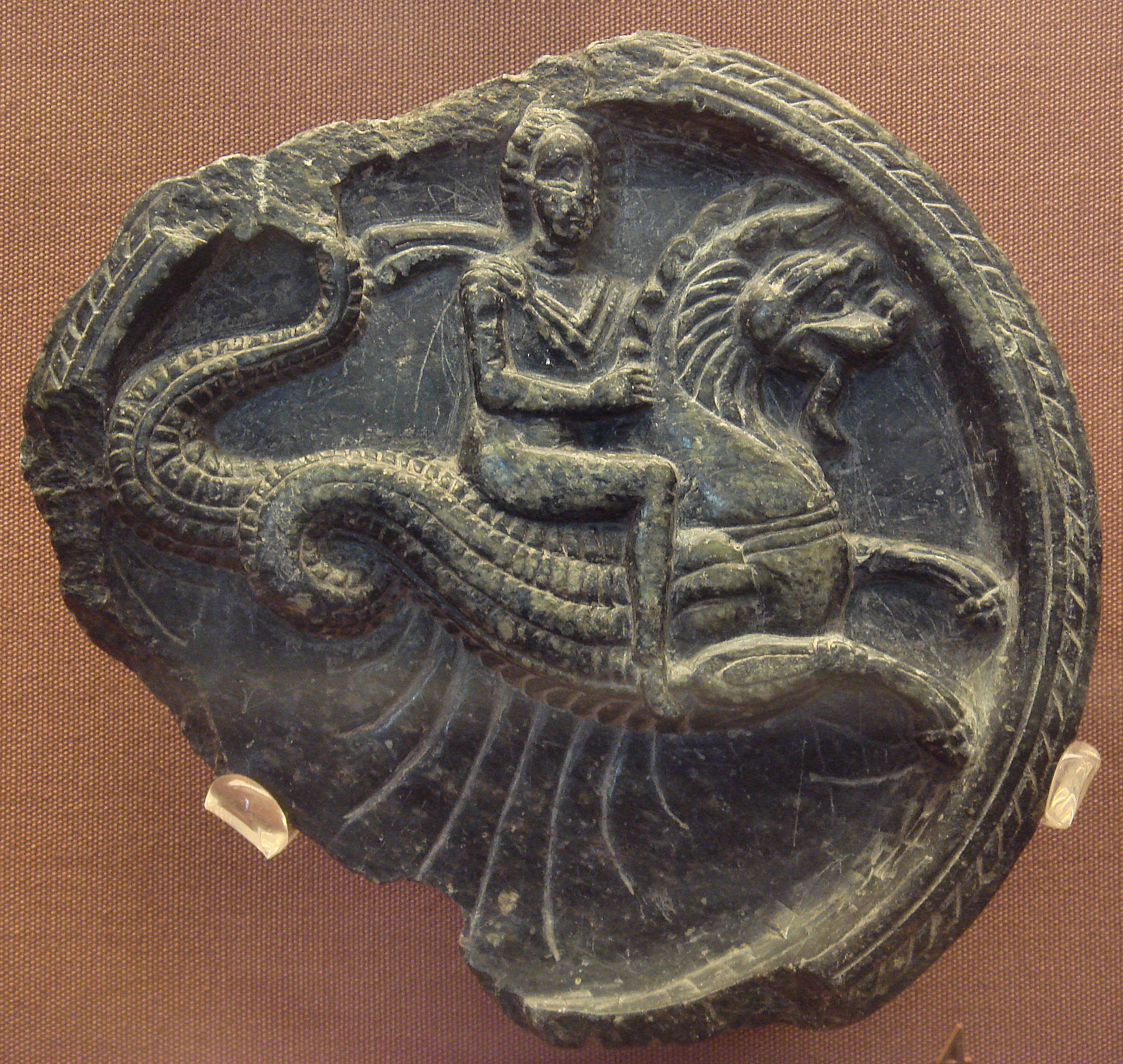
Man riding a Ketos sea-monster.

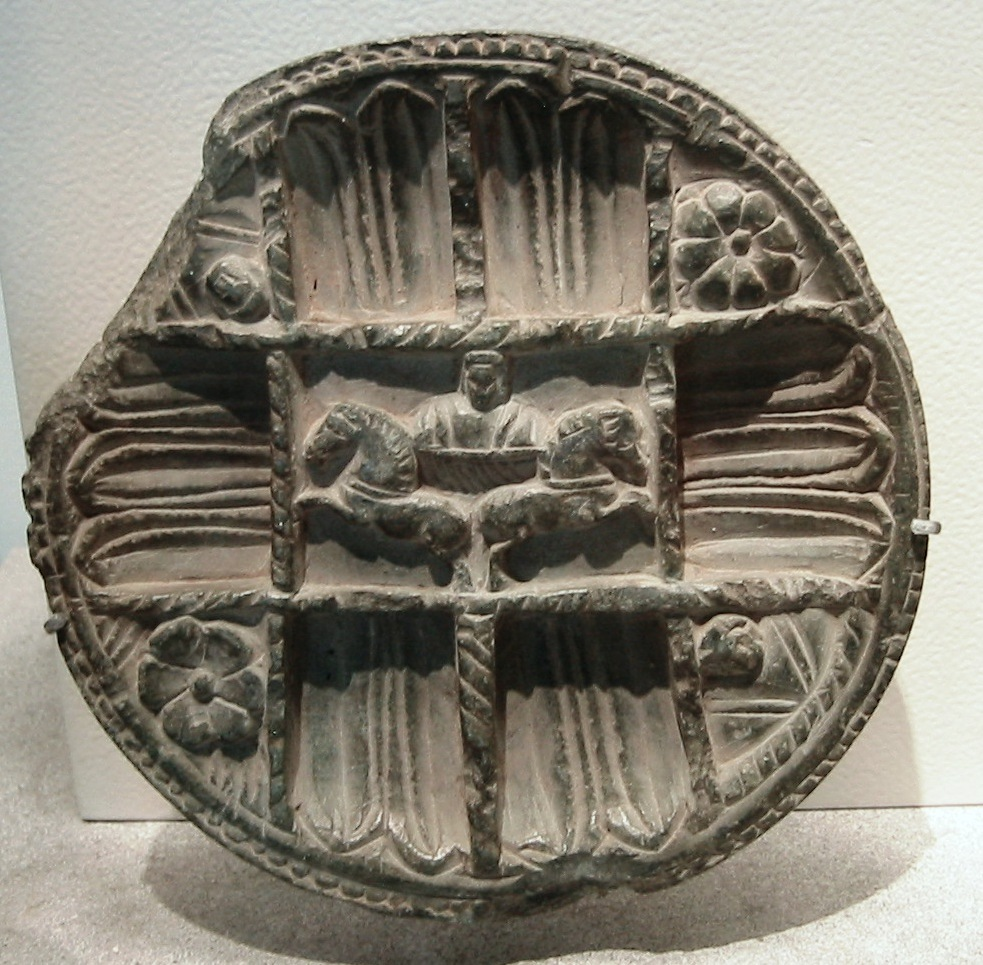
Sun god Surya, or possibly the Buddha, riding a chariot.

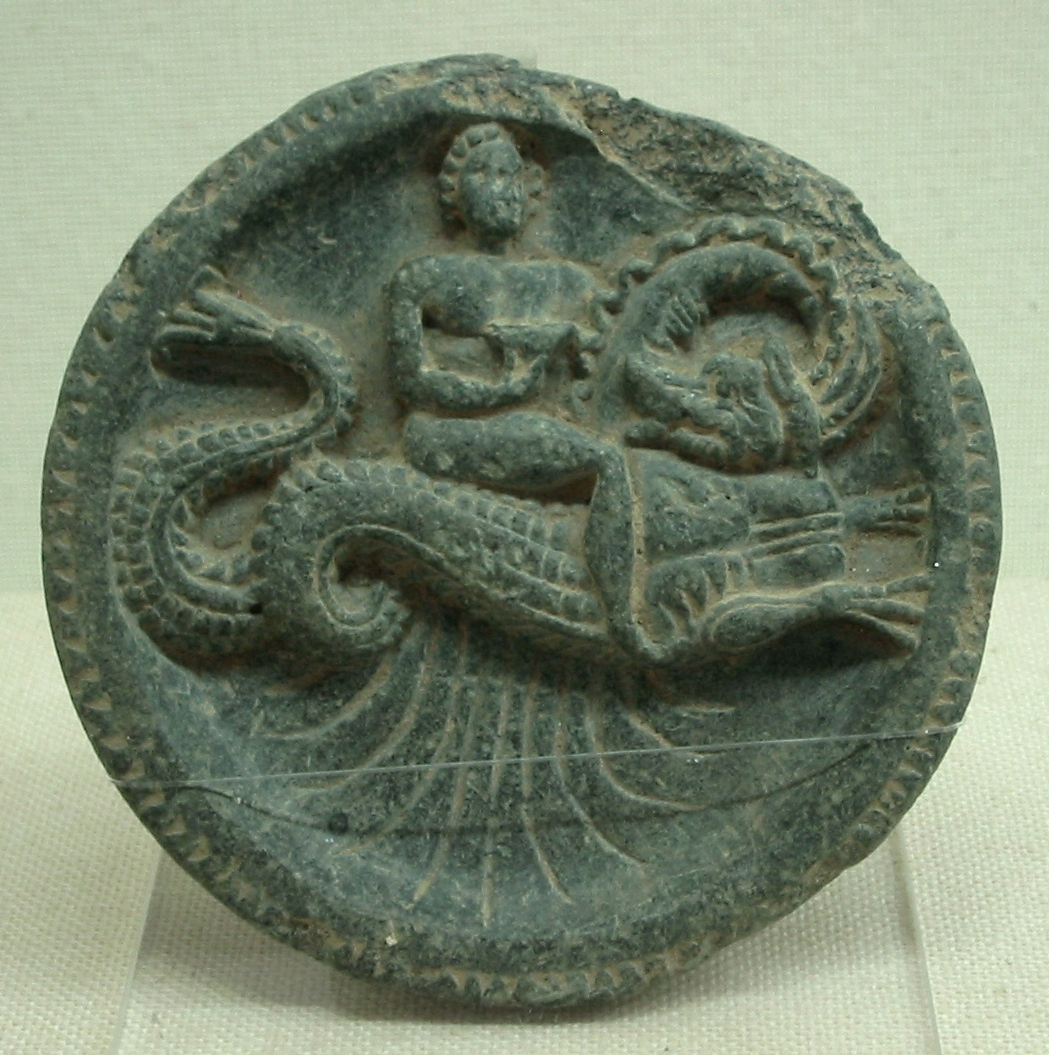
Man with cup, riding a Ketos sea-monster.

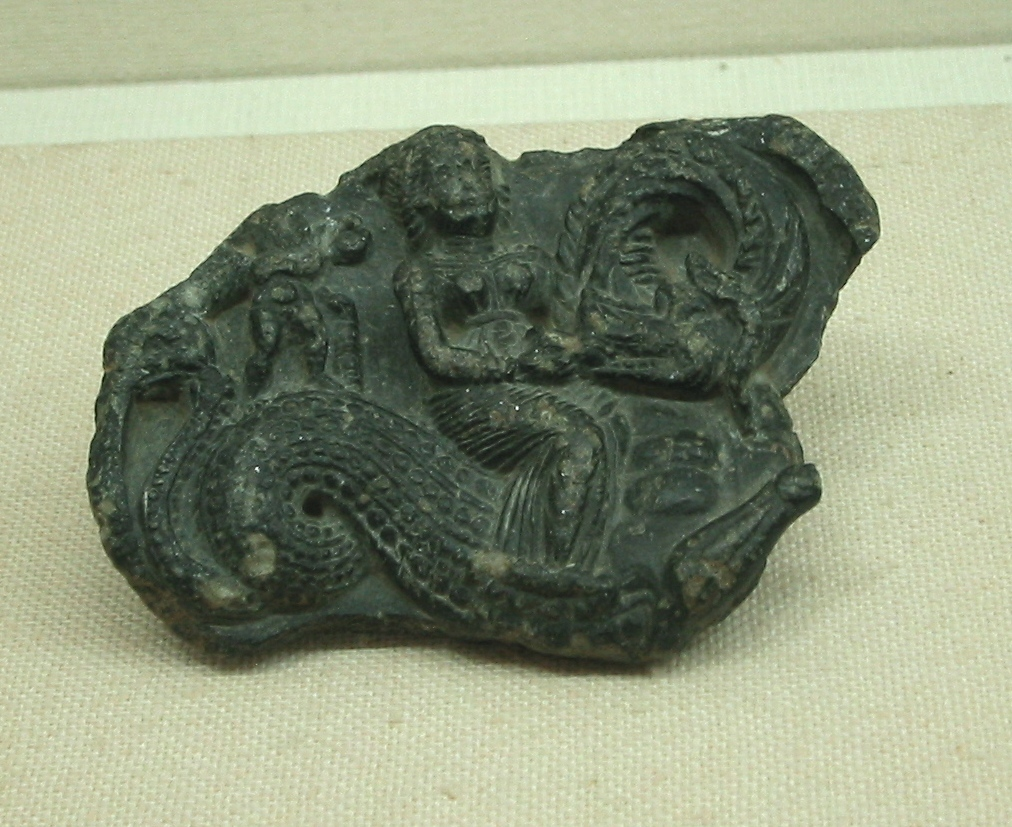
Woman in Greek clothing, riding a Ketos sea-monster.

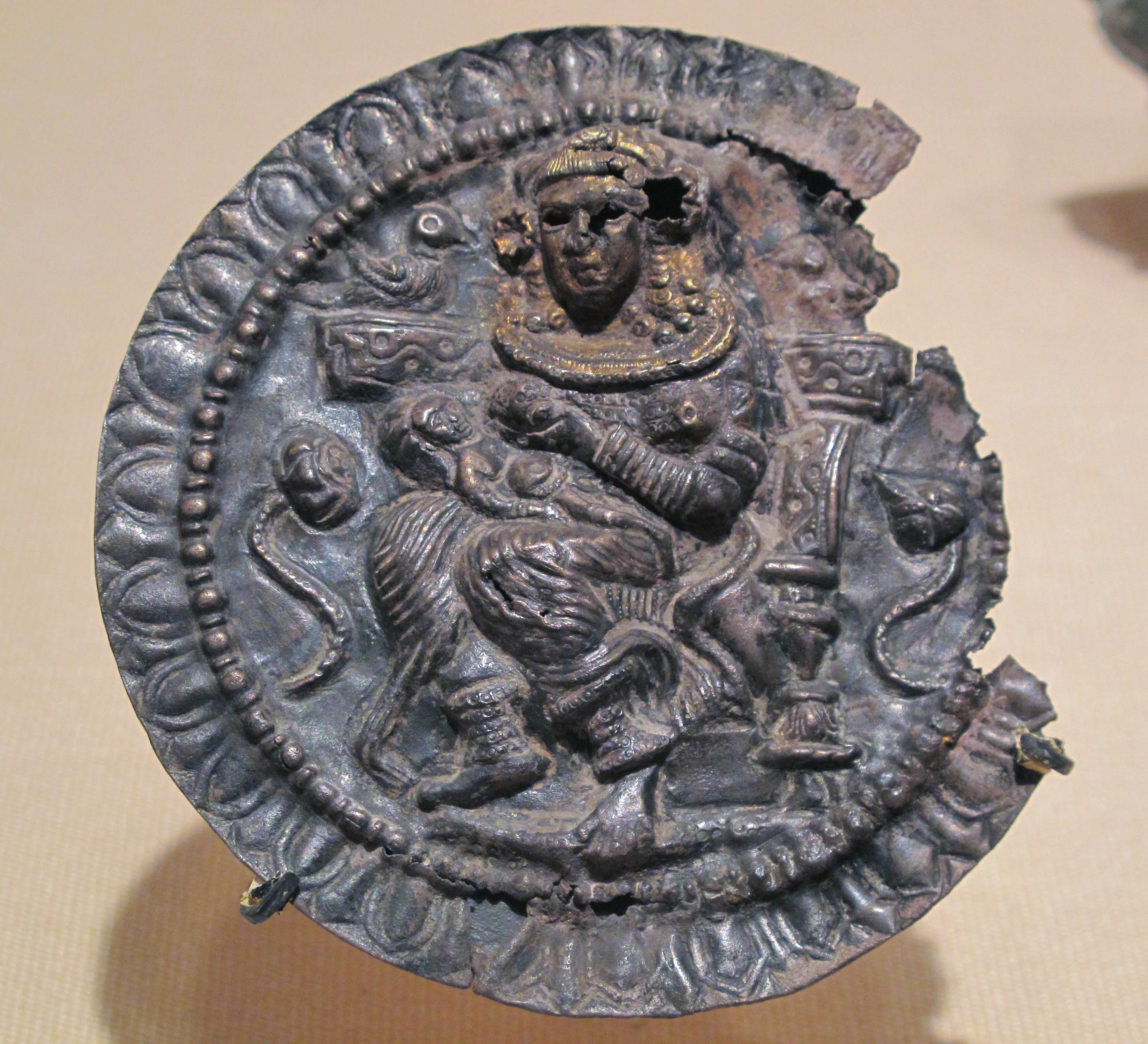
Palette with the Goddess Hariti.

== Egyptian stone palettes ==
Egyptians are known to have made stone palettes in the form of cups ("coupelles") with images of deities during the 2nd century CE, at the time of Roman Egypt. They variously represent Isis, Horus-Sobek, Sarapis, Harpocrates or Osiris.

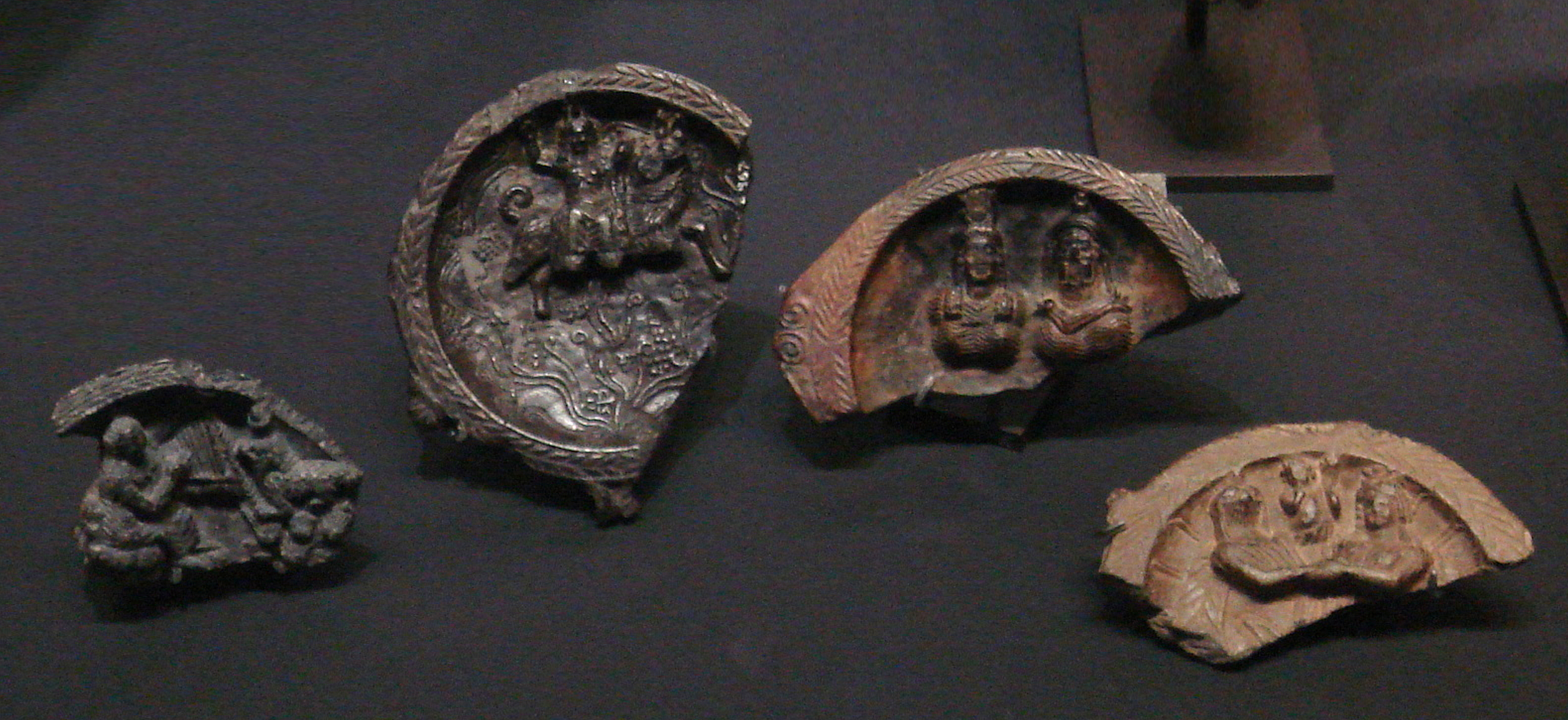
Egyptian coupelles with deities (Isis, Horus-Sobek...), 2nd century CE

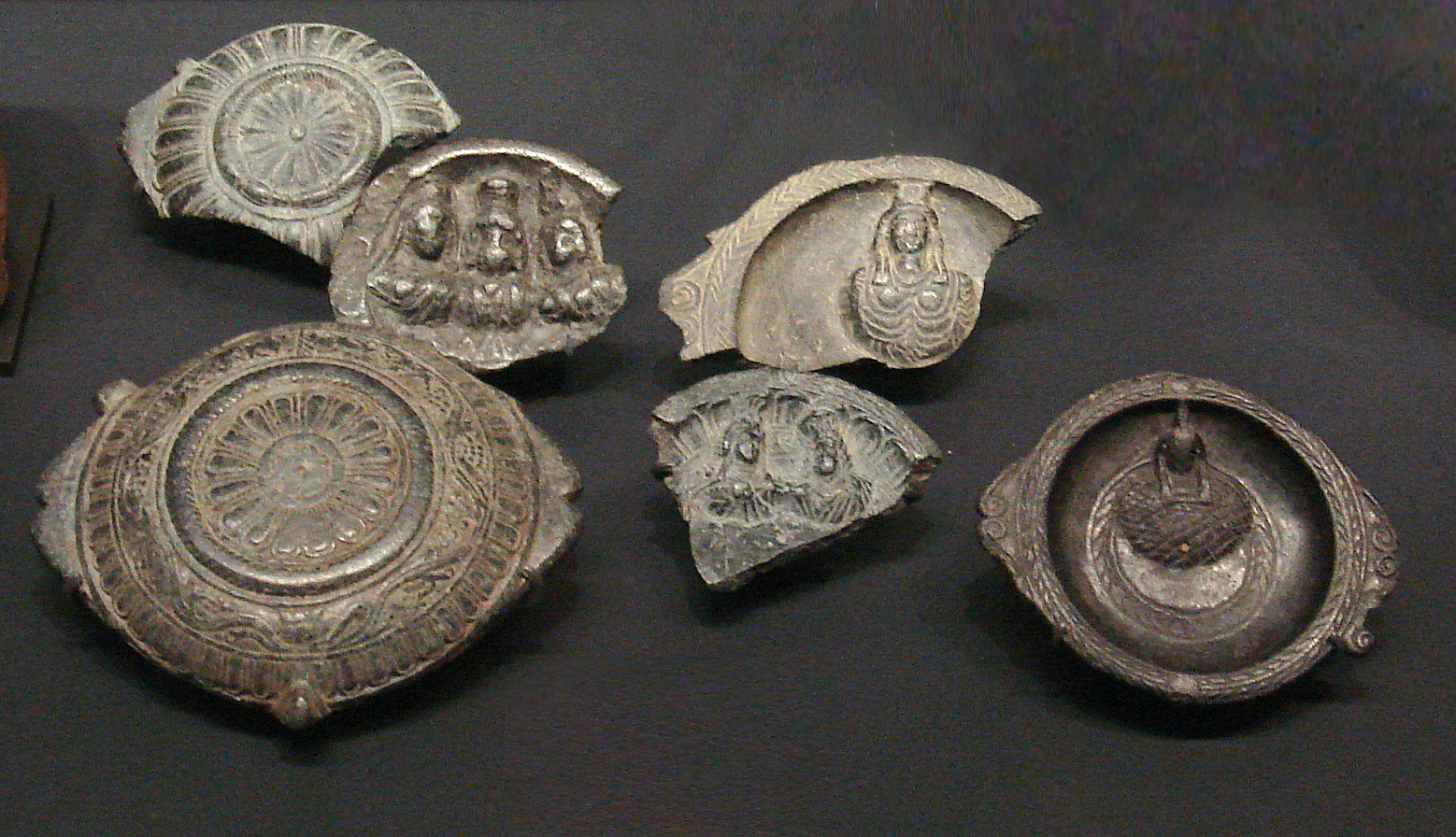
Egyptian cups with deities (Sarapis, Isis, Harpocrates, Horus, Osiris...), 2nd century CE

== See also ==
- Cosmetic palette
