= Sanskrit epigraphy =

Study of ancient Sanskrit inscriptions

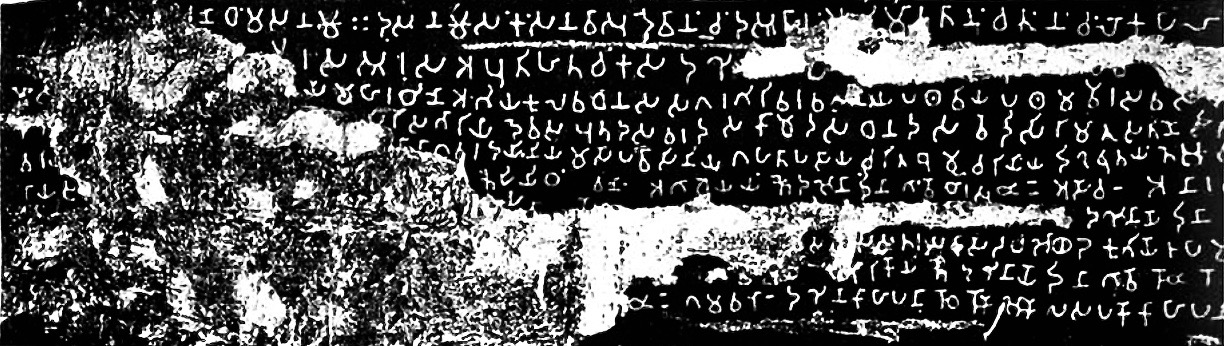
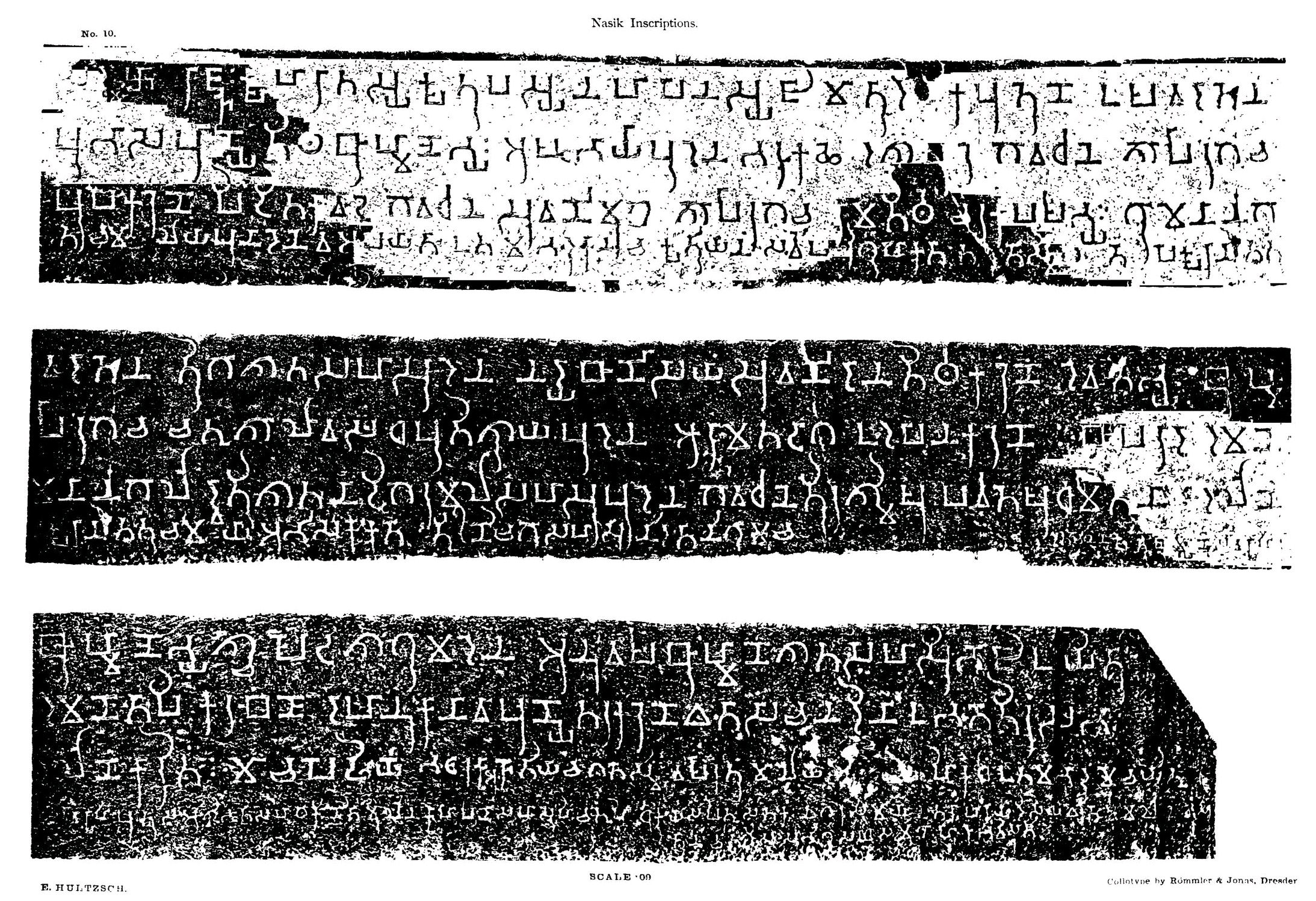
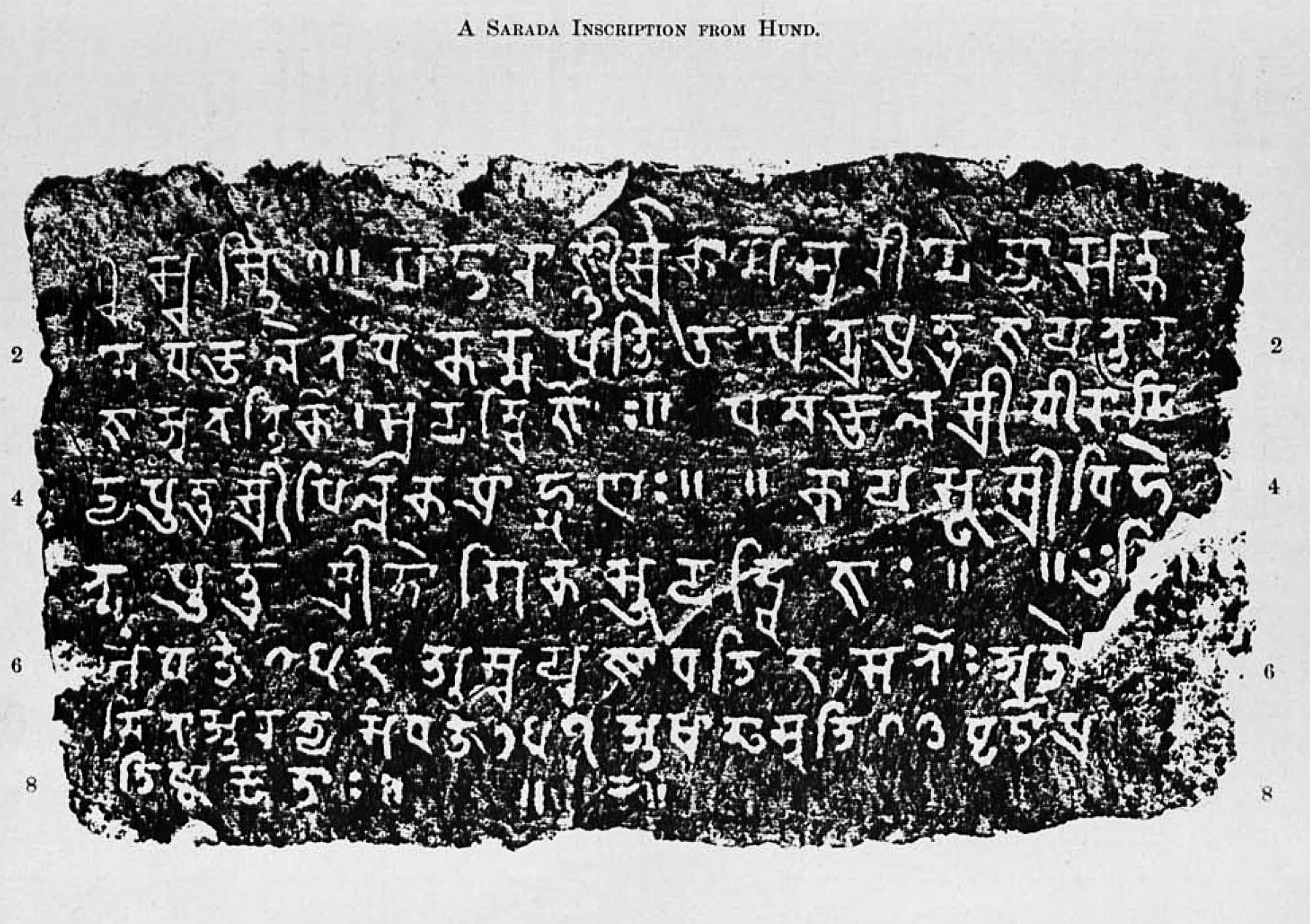
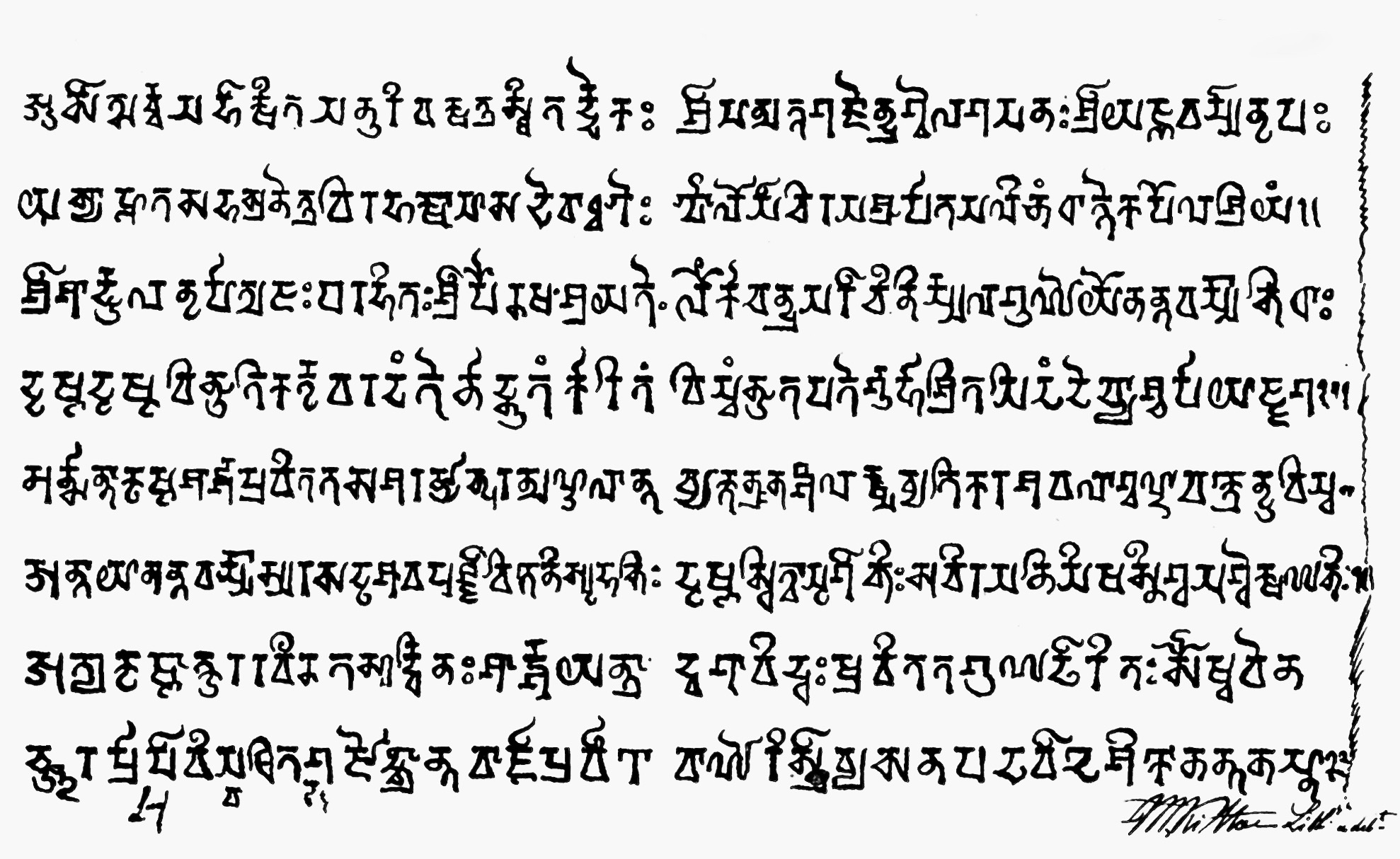
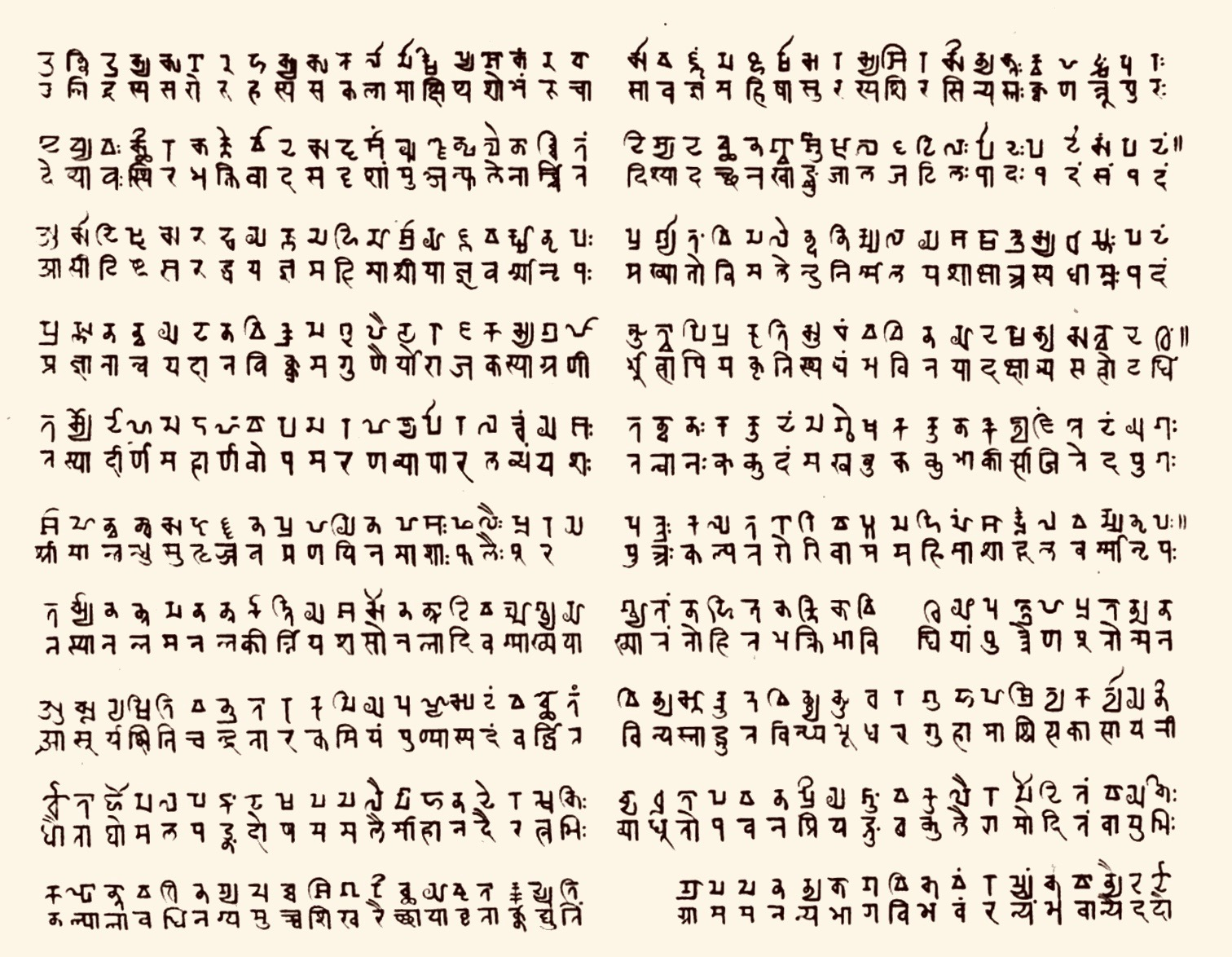
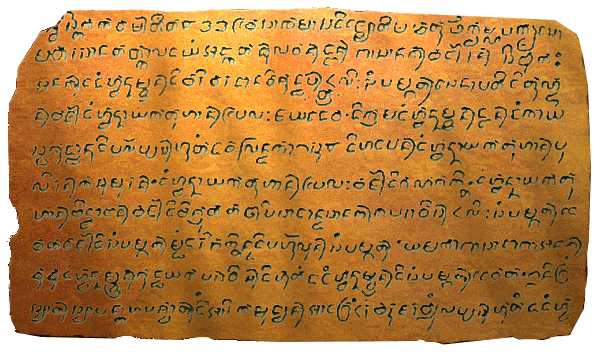
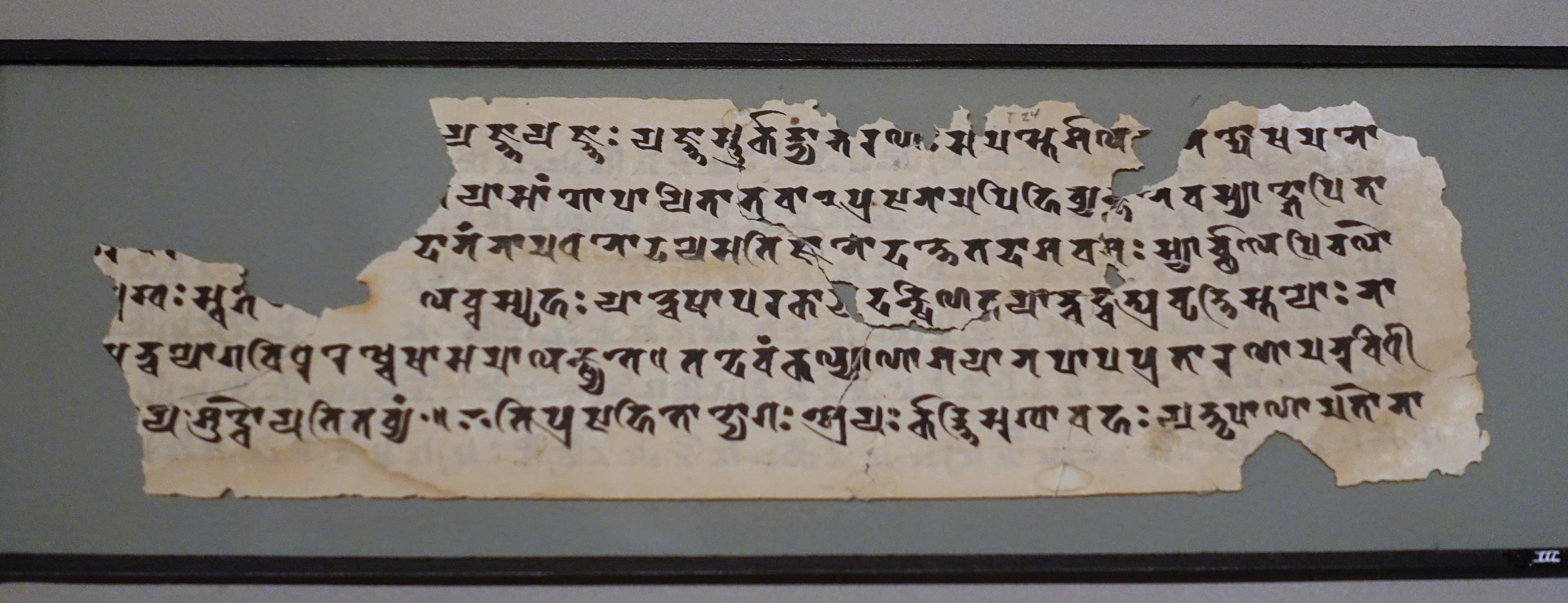
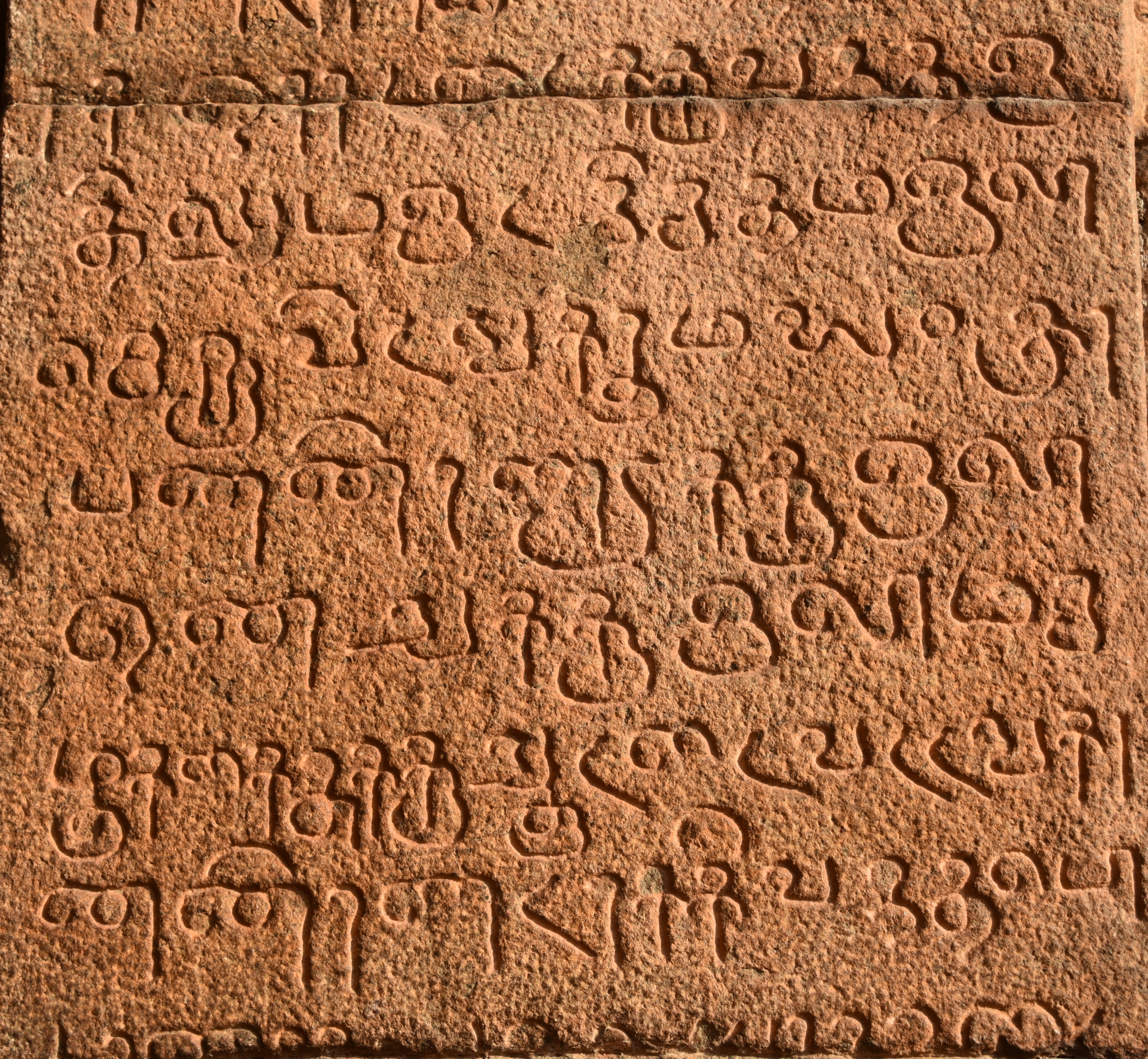
Starting in about the 1st century BCE, Sanskrit has been written in many South Asian, Southeast Asian and Central Asian scripts.

Sanskrit epigraphy, the study of ancient inscriptions in Sanskrit, offers insight into the linguistic, cultural, and historical evolution of South Asia and its neighbors. Early inscriptions, such as those from the 1st century BCE in Ayodhya and Hathibada, are written in Brahmi script and reflect the transition to classical Sanskrit. The Mathura inscriptions from the 1st and 2nd centuries CE, including the Mora Well and Vasu Doorjamb inscriptions, represent significant contributions to the early use of Sanskrit, often linked to Hindu and Jaina traditions.

The turning point in Sanskrit epigraphy came with the Rudradaman I inscription from the mid-2nd century CE, which established a poetic eulogy style later adopted during the Gupta Empire. This era saw Sanskrit become the predominant language for royal and religious records, documenting donations, public works, and the glorification of rulers. In South India, inscriptions such as those from Nagarjunakonda and Amaravati illustrate early use in Buddhist and Shaivite contexts, transitioning to exclusive Sanskrit use from the 4th century CE.

Sanskrit inscriptions extended beyond South Asia, influencing Southeast Asia from the 4th century CE onward. Indic scripts adapted for Sanskrit were found in regions like Vietnam, Malaysia, Indonesia, and Cambodia, where they evolved into local scripts such as Khmer, Javanese, and Balinese. These inscriptions highlight the spread of Indian cultural and religious practices.

By the classical period, Sanskrit inscriptions across stone, metal, and other materials became central to documenting royal achievements, religious activities, and societal developments. The decline of Sanskrit epigraphy coincided with the rise of regional languages in inscriptions, yet its legacy endures in the historical and cultural records it preserved.

== Early inscriptions ==
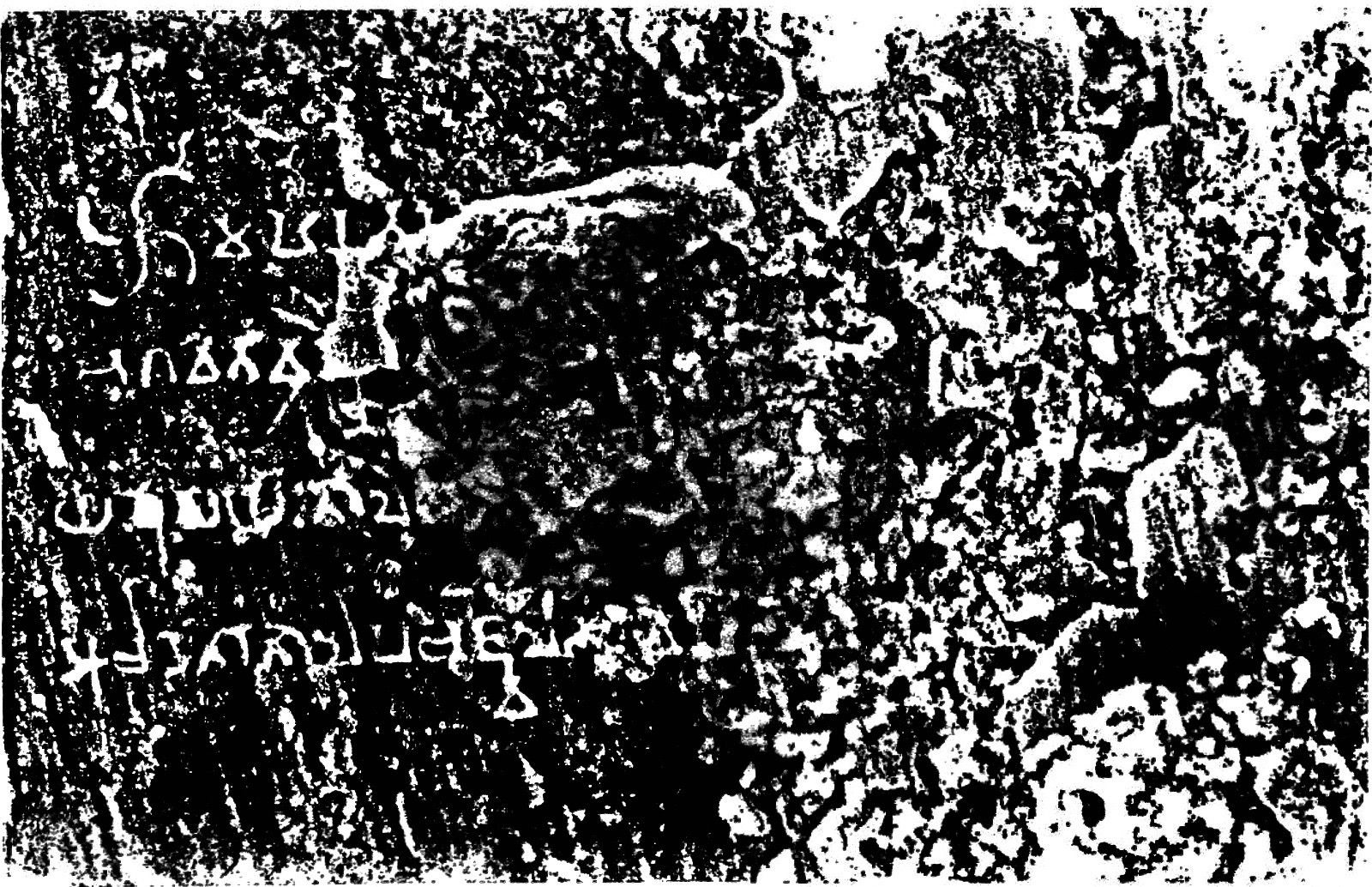
1st century CE Mora Well Inscription in Brahmi script

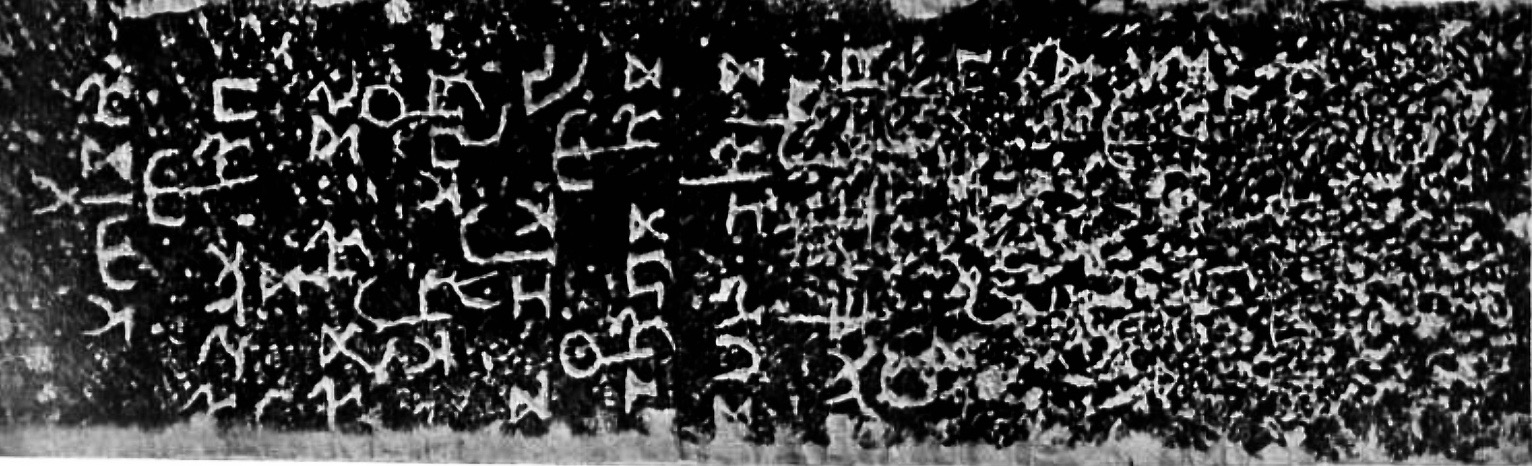
Vasu Doorjamb Inscription 1st century CE

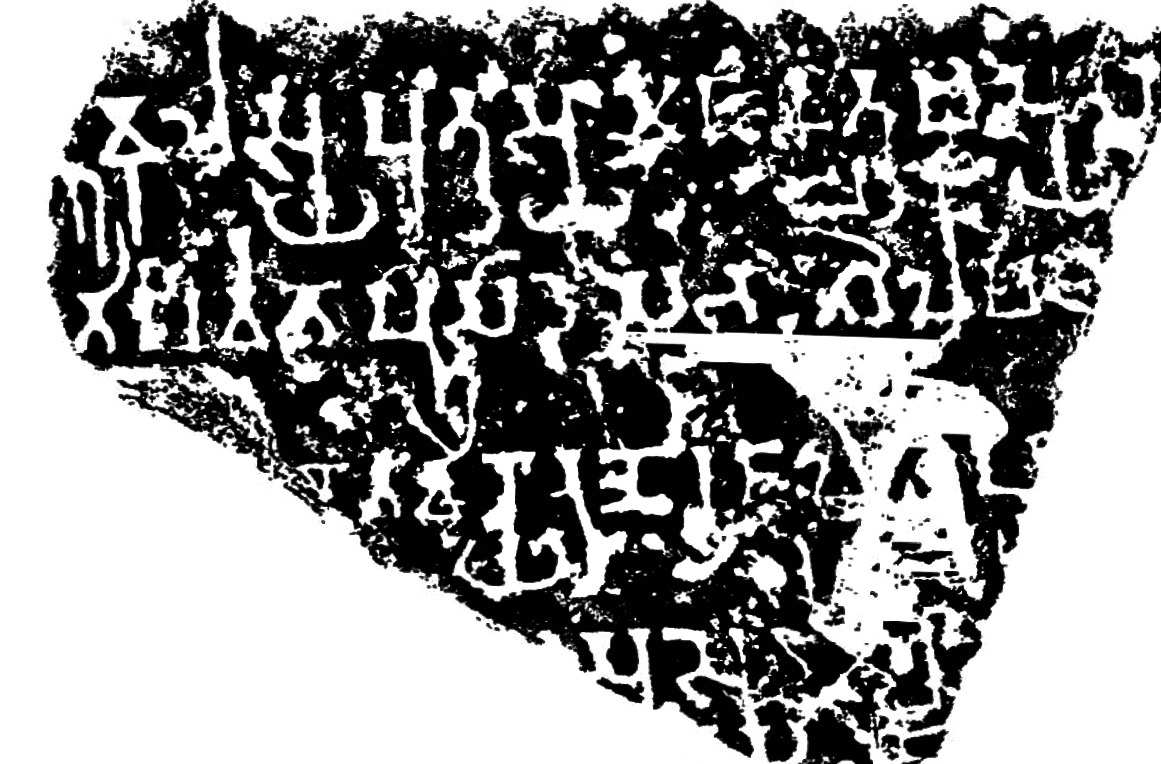
Mountain Temple Inscription

The earliest known stone inscriptions in Sanskrit are in the Brahmi script from the first century BCE. (Note: Some scholars date these to the 2nd century BCE.) (Note: Prakrit inscriptions of ancient India, such as those of Ashoka, are older. Louis Renou called it "the great linguistical paradox of India" that the Sanskrit inscriptions appear later than Prakrit inscriptions, although Prakrit is considered as a descendant of the Sanskrit language.) These include the Ayodhyā (Uttar Pradesh) and Hāthībādā-Ghosuṇḍī (near Chittorgarh, Rajasthan) inscriptions. Both of these, states Salomon, are "essentially standard" and "correct Sanskrit", with a few exceptions reflecting an "informal Sanskrit usage". Other important Hindu inscriptions dated to the 1st century BCE, in relatively accurate classical Sanskrit and Brahmi script are the Yavanarajya inscription on a red sandstone slab and the long Naneghat inscription on the wall of a cave rest stop in the Western Ghats. Besides these few examples from the 1st century BCE, the earliest Sanskrit and hybrid dialect inscriptions are found in Mathura (Uttar Pradesh). These date to the 1st and 2nd century CE, states Salomon, from the time of the Indo-Scythian Northern Satraps and the subsequent Kushan Empire. (Note: According to Salomon, towards the end of pre-Christian era, "a smattering" of standard or nearly standard Sanskrit inscriptions came into vogue, and "we may assume that these are isolated survivals of what must have been then an increasingly common practice". He adds, that the Scythian rulers of northern and western India while not the originators, were promoters of the use of Sanskrit language for inscriptions, and "their motivation in promoting Sanskrit was presumably a desire to establish themselves as legitimate Indian or at least Indianized rulers and to curry the favor of the educated Brahmanical elite".) These are also in the Brahmi script. The earliest of these, states Salomon, are attributed to Ksatrapa Sodasa from the early years of 1st century CE. Of the Mathura inscriptions, the most significant is the Mora Well Inscription. In a manner similar to the Hathibada inscription, the Mora well inscription is a dedicatory inscription and is linked to the cult of the Vrishni heroes: it mentions a stone shrine (temple), pratima (murti, images) and calls the five Vrishnis as bhagavatam. There are many other Mathura Sanskrit inscriptions in Brahmi script overlapping the era of Indo-Scythian Northern Satraps and early Kushanas. Other significant 1st-century inscriptions in reasonably good classical Sanskrit in the Brahmi script include the Vasu Doorjamb Inscription and the Mountain Temple inscription. The early ones are related to the Brahmanical, except for the inscription from Kankali Tila which may be Jaina, but none are Buddhist. A few of the later inscriptions from the 2nd century CE include Buddhist Sanskrit, while others are in "more or less" standard Sanskrit and related to the Brahmanical tradition.

== Northwest India ==
In Maharashtra and Gujarat, Brahmi script Sanskrit inscriptions from the early centuries of the common era exist at the Nasik Caves site, near the Girnar mountain of Junagadh and elsewhere such as at Kanakhera, Kanheri, and Gunda. The Nasik inscription dates to the mid-1st century CE, is a fair approximation of standard Sanskrit and has hybrid features. The Junagadh rock inscription of Western Satraps ruler Rudradaman I (c. 150 CE, Gujarat) is the first long poetic-style inscription in "more or less" standard Sanskrit that has survived into the modern era. It represents a turning point in the history of Sanskrit epigraphy, states Salomon. (Note: The Rudradaman inscription is "not pure classical Sanskrit", but with few epic-vernacular Sanskrit exceptions, it approaches high classical Sanskrit.) Though no similar inscriptions are found for about two hundred years after the Rudradaman reign, it is important because its style is the prototype of the eulogy-style Sanskrit inscriptions found in the Gupta Empire era. These inscriptions are also in the Brahmi script.

== South India ==
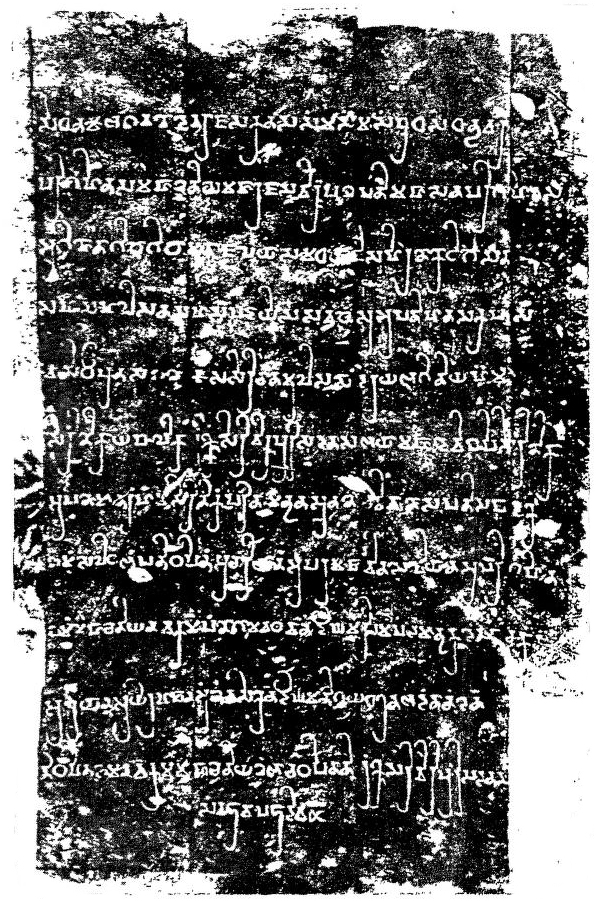
Nagarjunakonda Ayaka pillar inscription, Ikshvaku period (3rd c. CE)

The Nagarjunakonda inscriptions are the earliest known substantial South Indian Sanskrit inscriptions, probably from the late 3rd century or early 4th century CE, or both. These inscriptions are related to Buddhism and the Shaivism tradition of Hinduism. A few of these inscriptions from both traditions are verse-style in the classical Sanskrit language, while some such as the pillar inscription is written in prose and a hybridized Sanskrit language. An earlier hybrid Sanskrit inscription found on Amaravati slab is dated to the late 2nd century, while a few later ones include Sanskrit inscriptions along with Prakrit inscriptions related to Hinduism and Buddhism. After the 3rd century CE, Sanskrit inscriptions dominate and many have survived. Between the 4th and 7th centuries CE, south Indian inscriptions are exclusively in the Sanskrit language. (Note: Finally, after this transitional period in the fourth and early fifth centuries CE, Prakrit fell out of use completely in southern Indian inscriptions. For the next few centuries Sanskrit was the sole epigraphic language, until the regional Dravidian languages began to come into use around the seventh century. —) In the eastern regions of South Asia, scholars report minor Sanskrit inscriptions from the 2nd century, these being fragments and scattered. The earliest substantial true Sanskrit language inscription of Susuniya (West Bengal) is dated to the 4th century. Elsewhere, such as Dehradun (Uttarakhand), inscriptions in more or less correct classical Sanskrit inscriptions are dated to the 3rd century.

== Southeast Asia ==
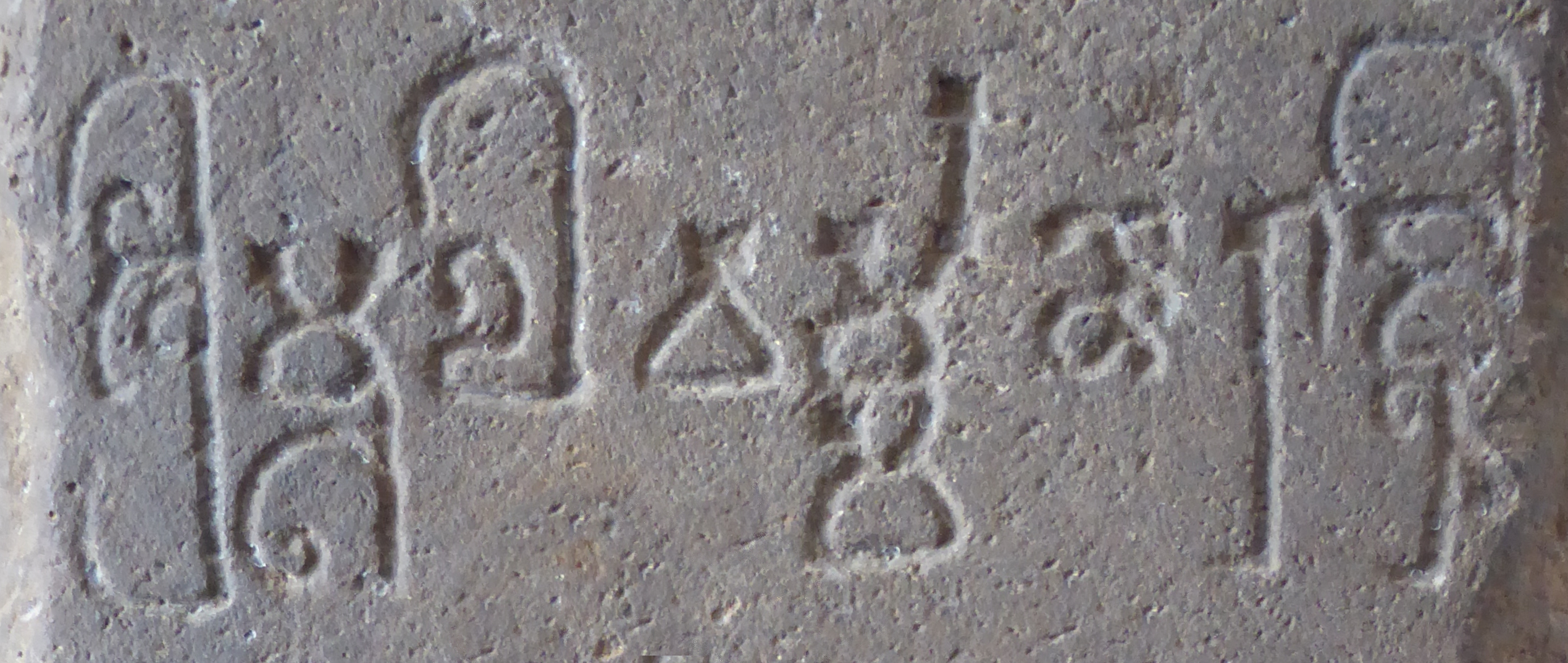
Mulavarman inscription, eastern Borneo, 5th c. CE

The evidence of the use of the Sanskrit language in Indic writing systems appears in southeast Asia in the first half of the 1st millennium CE. A few of these in Vietnam are bilingual where both the Sanskrit and the local language is written in the Indian alphabet. Early Sanskrit language inscriptions in Indic writing systems are dated to the 4th century in Malaysia, 5th to 6th centuries in Thailand near Si Thep and the Sak River, early 5th century in Kutai (known as the Mulavarman inscription discovered in eastern Borneo), and mid-5th century in west Java (Indonesia). Both major writing systems for Sanskrit, the North Indian and South Indian scripts, have been discovered in southeast Asia, but the Southern variety with its rounded shapes are far more common. The Indic scripts, particularly the Pallava script prototype, spread and ultimately evolved into Mon-Burmese, Khmer, Thai, Lao, Sumatran, Celebes, Javanese and Balinese scripts. From about the 5th century, Sanskrit inscriptions become common in many parts of South Asia and Southeast Asia, with significant discoveries in Nepal, Vietnam and Cambodia.

== Decline ==
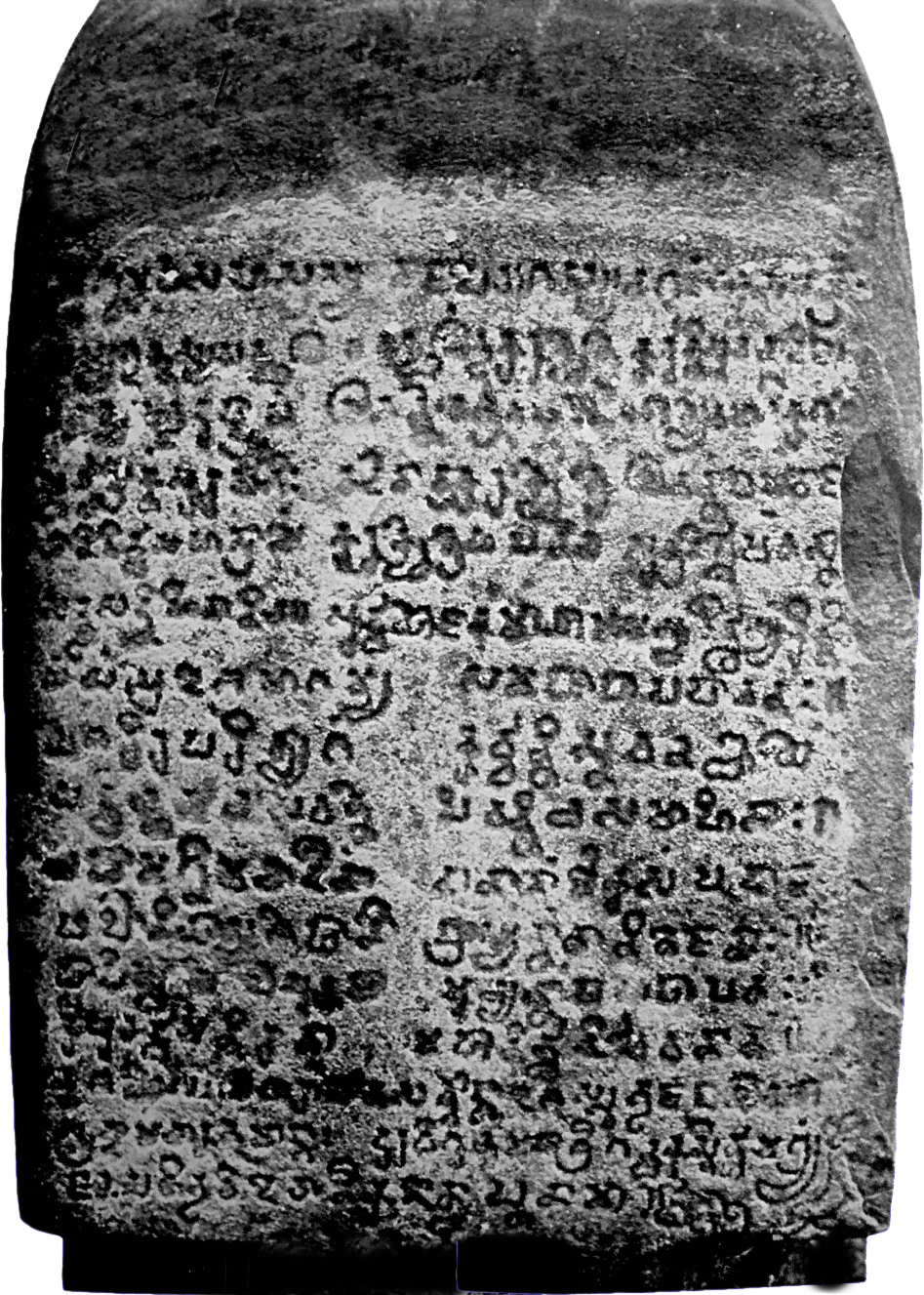
Champassak inscription, in Prashasti (panegyric) style, Vat Phou, c. 450 CE

According to Salomon, the 4th-century reign of Samudragupta was the turning point when the classical Sanskrit language became established as the "epigraphic language par excellence" of the Indian world. These Sanskrit language inscriptions are either donative or panegyric records. Generally in accurate classical Sanskrit, they deploy a wide range of regional Indic writing systems extant at the time. Donative inscriptions record the donation of a temple or stupa, images, land, monasteries, pilgrim's travel record, public infrastructure such as water reservoir and irrigation measures to prevent famine. Panegyrics praise the king or the donor in lofty poetic terms. The Sanskrit language of these inscriptions is written on stone, various metals, terracotta, wood, crystal, ivory, shell, and cloth. (Note: The use of the Sanskrit language in epigraphy gradually dropped after the arrival and the consolidation of Islamic Delhi Sultanate rule in the late 12th century, but it remained in active epigraphical use in the south and central regions of India. By about the 14th century, with the Islamic armies conquering more of South Asia, the use of Sanskrit language for inscriptions became rarer and it was replaced with Persian, Arabic, Dravidian and North-Indo-Aryan languages, states Salomon. The Sanskrit language, particularly in bilingual form, re-emerged in the epigraphy of Hindu kingdoms such as the Vijayanagara, Yadavas, Hoysalas, Pandyas, and others that re-established themselves. Some Muslim rulers such as Adil Shah also issued Sanskrit language inscriptions recording the donation of a mosque.)

== See also ==
- B. Lewis Rice
- Corpus Inscriptionum Indicarum
- Early Indian epigraphy
- Epigraphia Indica
- John Faithfull Fleet
- K. V. Ramesh
- List of Sanskrit-related topics
- Prashasti
- Proto-Indo-Aryan
- Proto-Indo-European
- Proto-Indo-Iranian
- Spitzer Manuscript
- The Indian Antiquary
- Vasudev Vishnu Mirashi
- Western Satraps
