= Mirzapur stele inscription =

1st century dedicatory inscription on stone slab

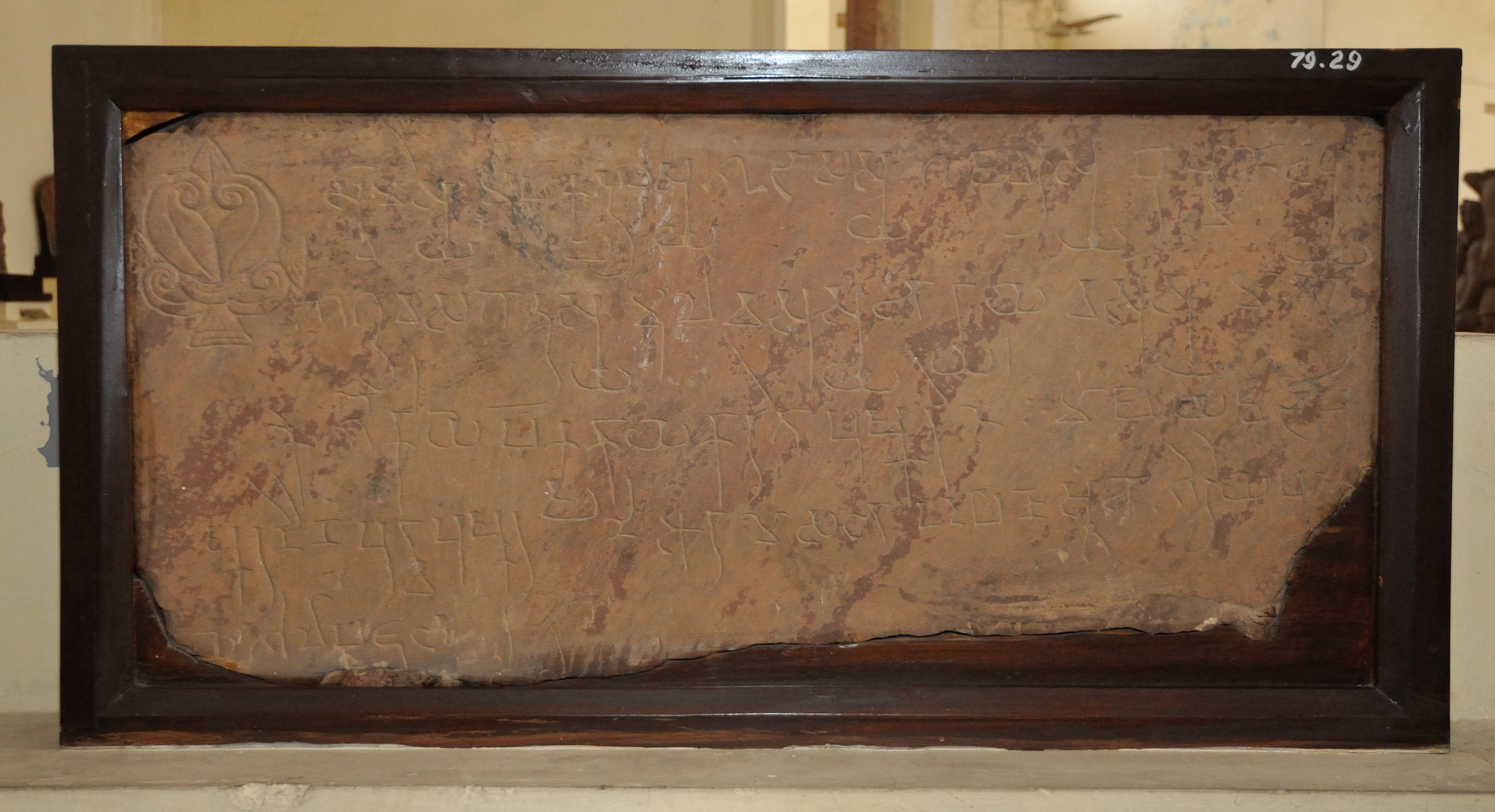
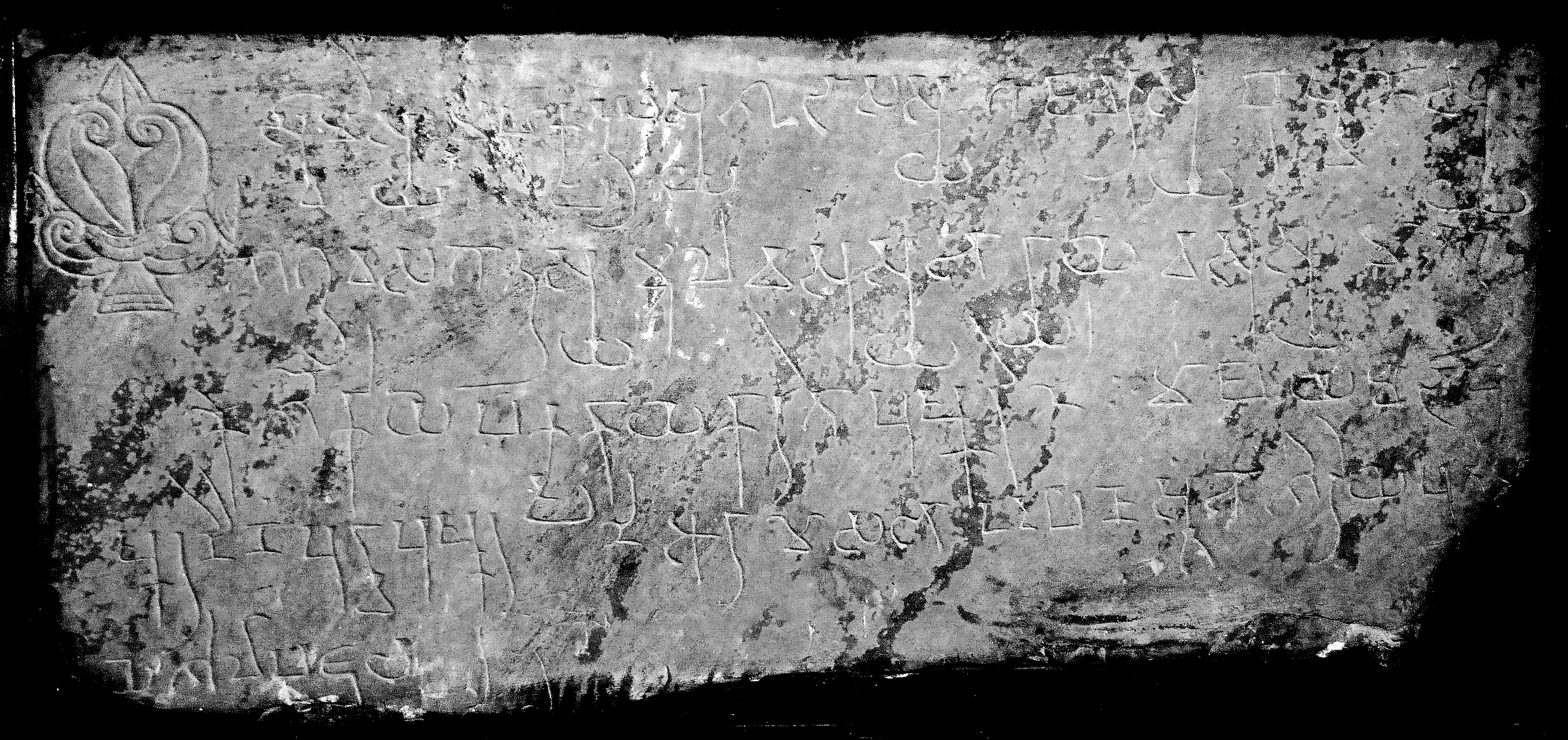
- Mirzapur stele inscription. Mathura Museum
- Material: Red sandstone
- Period/culture: Circa 15 CE
- Discovered: 27.4568°N 77.6914°E
- Place: Mirzapur, Mathura, India.
- Present location: Mathura Museum, GMM 79.29

The Mirzapur stele inscription, also called the Mirjāpur stele inscription, is a dedicatory inscription on a large stone slab discovered in the Mirzapur area of Mathura which mentions the erection of a water tank by Mulavasu and his consort Kausiki, during the reign of the Sodasa, the Indo-Scythian Northern Satrap ruler of Mathura, assuming the title of "Svami (Lord) Mahakshatrapa (Great Satrap)".

== Inscription ==
The stele bears a five line epigraph mentioning the dedication. The text is as follows :

1.1 Svamisya Mahaksatrapasya Sodasasya gamjavarasya Brahmanasya.
1.2 Segravasa gotrasya Mulavasusya bharyaye Vasusya matare.
1.3 Kausikiye Paksakaye karita puskarini imasam Yamada pu
1.4 skaraninam purva puskarani aramo sabha udapano stambho siriye pratima
1.5 ye sila patto ca

"Kausiki Paksaka, mother of Vasu and wife of Mulavasu (who was the) treasurer of Svami Mahaksatrapa Shodasa and (who was) a Brahmana belonging to the Saigrava gotra, caused to erect the eastern (water) tank out of the twin tanks, a grove or garden, place for assembly, a well, a pillar and a stone slab of the image of Laksmi."

== Reign of Sodasa ==
The rule of Sodasa at the time of the erection of the stele is clearly mentioned, as are his titles "Lord Great Satrap":

"Svamisya Mahakshatrapasya Sudasasya"
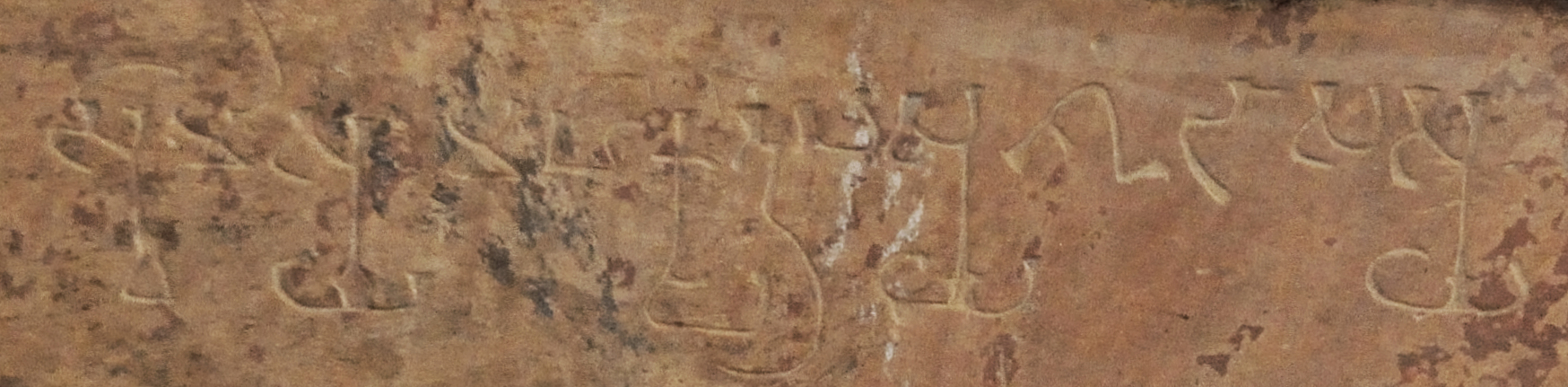
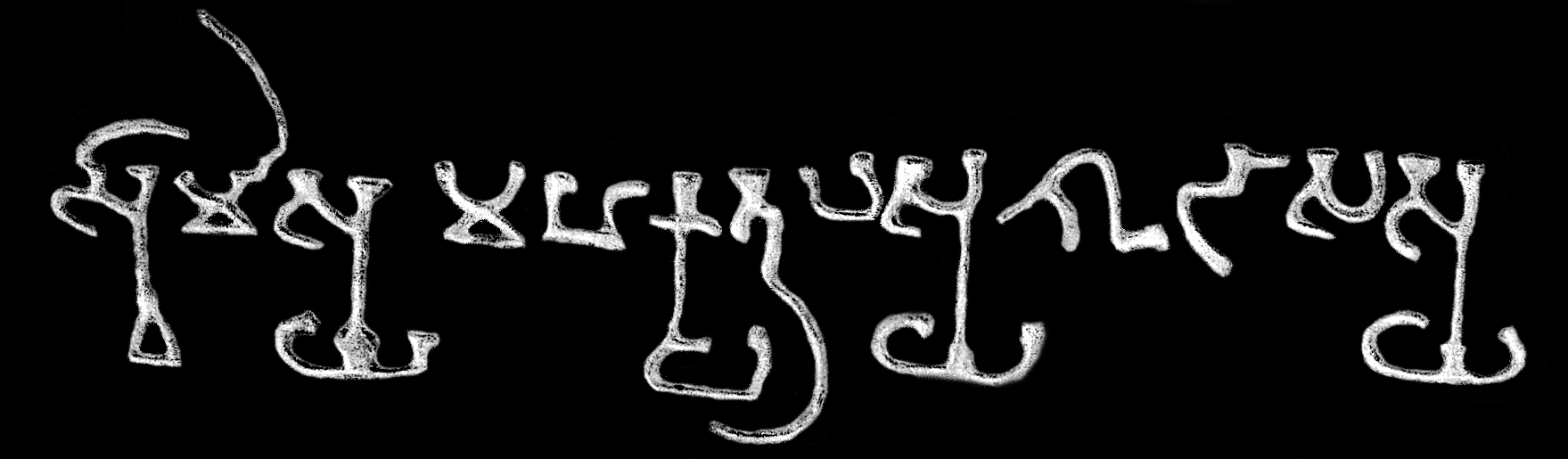
Regnal title of Sodasa in the Mizrapur inscription, vicinity of Mathura. (Middle Brahmi script):

Svāmisya Mahakṣatrapasya Śudasasya
"Of the Lord and Great Satrap Śudāsa"
