= Vasu Doorjamb Inscription =

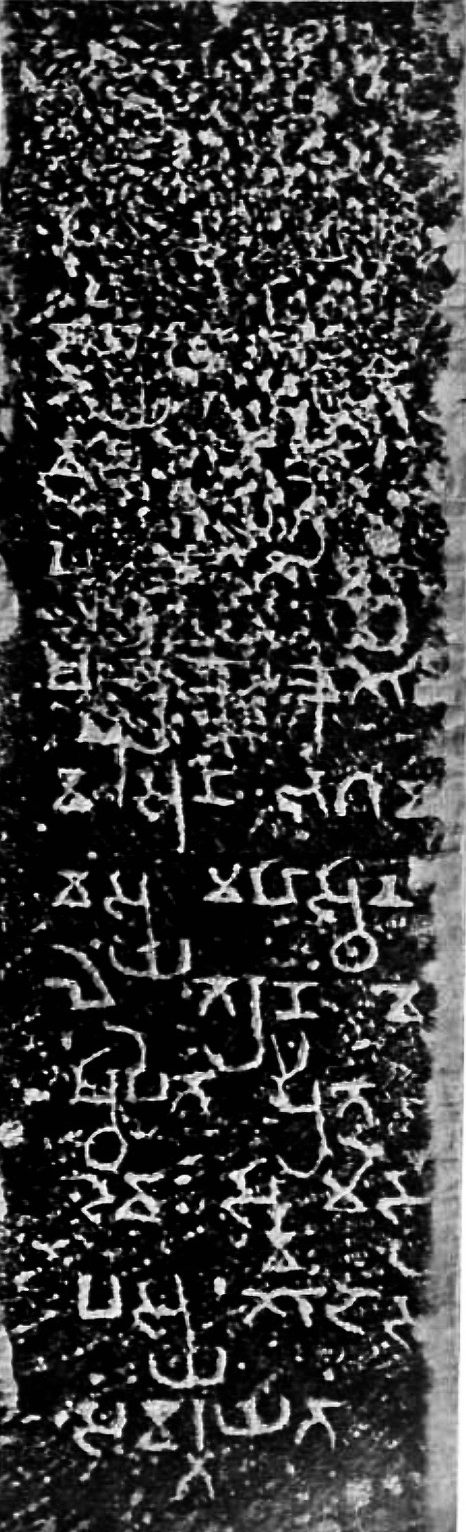
- 1st century CE Vasu Doorjamb Inscription, in Sanskrit
- Material: Red Sandstone
- Writing: Sanskrit, Brahmi script
- Created: Circa 15 CE (reign of Sodasa)
- Place: Mathura, Uttar Pradesh
- Present location: Government Museum, Mathura
- Identification: GMM 13.367

Location
- Mathura (India)

The Vasu Doorjamb Inscription is an early 1st-century CE Sanskrit inscription in Brahmi script dedicated to the deity Vāsudeva, related to the Vaishnavism tradition of Hinduism. It is also one of the several dedicatory inscriptions from Mathura bearing the name of the Indo-Scythian Northern Satrap ruler Sodasa, which are useful as historic markers for the first half of the 1st century CE.

The inscription was found on a red sandstone temple doorjamb dumped in an old well in Mathura, Uttar Pradesh. The doorjamb is about 8 feet (2.4 m) long, 1.24 feet (0.38 m) wide and 8 inches (200 mm) thick. It is intricately carved on one side while the other side is flat. On the flat side, British India era archaeologists discovered that there is a 12-line inscription, which has been named the Vasu Doorjamb Inscription. The artifact is now at the Mathura Museum and a much studied item. It mentions a 1st-century Vishnu temple, a torana (temple gateway) and a vedika (railing).

The Vasu Doorjamb Inscription is another archaeological evidence about ancient Vaishnavism, providing another link about the continuity between ancient religious traditions and contemporary Hinduism.

== Date ==
According to Richard Salomon, the inscription is from the time of the Indo-Scythian Northern Satrap Sodasa, or early years of the 1st-century CE. The name of the ruler appears with his full title (Middle Brahmi script: Svāmisya (Mahakṣatra)pasya Śodasa "Lord and Great Satrap Śodāsa") in the inscription. Sonya Quintanilla concurs and estimates about 15 CE, based on a combination of style, script, paleography and numismatic evidence.

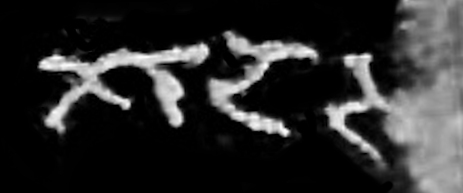
The name "Sodasa" (Śodāsa) in the Vasu doorjamb inscription.

According to Quintanilla, beyond the name, the style of the doorjamb and the carving on it is similar to that found in pieces recovered from close by locations at the Mathura archaeological site such as the Jain Parshvanatha ayagapata and the Namdighosa ayagapata. These too are dated to the early decades of the 1st-century CE. However, Joanna Williams split-dates the Vasu Doorjamb, stating that the inscription is from early 1st-century CE but the carving may be from the 3rd-century CE because the intricate relief on Vasu doorjamb is more sophisticated, reminding one of the elegance of the early Gupta artists. Quintilla, in contrast, states that the piece was likely carved and inscribed together prior to its installation in 1st-century CE because there are stylistic differences between the Vasu Doorjamb carvings and those found in the 3rd-century pieces. She states that the similarity in Jain reliefs of the 1st-century CE suggests it more likely that the Vasu piece too was prepared and installed in the 1st-century.

== Inscription ==
The discovered inscription is damaged, with parts so defaced that they cannot be read. Out of twelve lines, the first five are too damaged to be analyzed. The last seven lines have attracted scholarly studies. Since its discovery, its antiquity and significance has led scholars to interpret it as is, as well as make best guess interpolations and reconstruction followed by a revised translation.

Vasu Doorjamb inscription
Translation
(without interpolation)

(lines 1—5 are un-translatable)

6. by Vasu, the Lord...
7. the great temple of—va . . .
8. the gateway . . .
9. was established, pleased . . .
10. —deva of svami . . .
11. —pa Soda[sa] . . .
12. Let it/him be promoted . . .

Transliteration

1. [va]...
2. sa [ṣ]ya...
3. va s-...
4. p...śi... (Note: Chakravarti stated in 1942 that some scholars are able to read the Brahmi script for Siva.)
5. ṣapu[t]reṇa kauśi . . .
6. vasunā bhaga[va] . . .
7. vasya mahāsthāna . . .
8. lam toraṇam ve . . .
9. ṣṭhāpito prīto . . .
10. devaḥ svāmis- . . .
11. pasya śoḍā[sa] . . .
12. saṃvartayatāṃ . . .

Early Brahmi script

1. [𑀯] . . .
2. 𑀲𑀲𑁆𑀬 . . .
3. 𑀯𑀲 . . .
4. 𑀧 . . .𑀲𑀺 . . .
5. 𑀲𑀧𑀼𑀢𑁆𑀭𑁂𑀦 𑀓𑁅𑀲𑀺 . . .
6. 𑀯𑀲𑀼𑀦𑀸 𑀪𑀕[𑀯] . . .
7. 𑀯𑀲𑁆𑀬 𑀫𑀳𑀸𑀲𑁆𑀞𑀸𑀦 . . .
8. 𑀮𑀁 𑀢𑁄𑀭𑀦𑀁 𑀯𑁂 . . .
9. 𑀲𑁆𑀞𑀸𑀧𑀺𑀢𑁄 𑀧𑁆𑀭𑀺𑀢𑁄
10. 𑀤𑁂𑀯𑁊 𑀲𑁆𑀯𑀸𑀫𑀺𑀲 . . .
11. 𑀧𑀲𑁆𑀬 𑀰𑁄𑀤𑀸[𑀲] . . .
12. 𑀲𑀁𑀯𑁆𑀭𑀢𑀬𑀢𑀸𑀁 . . .

Inscription
(Prakrit in the Middle Brahmi script)

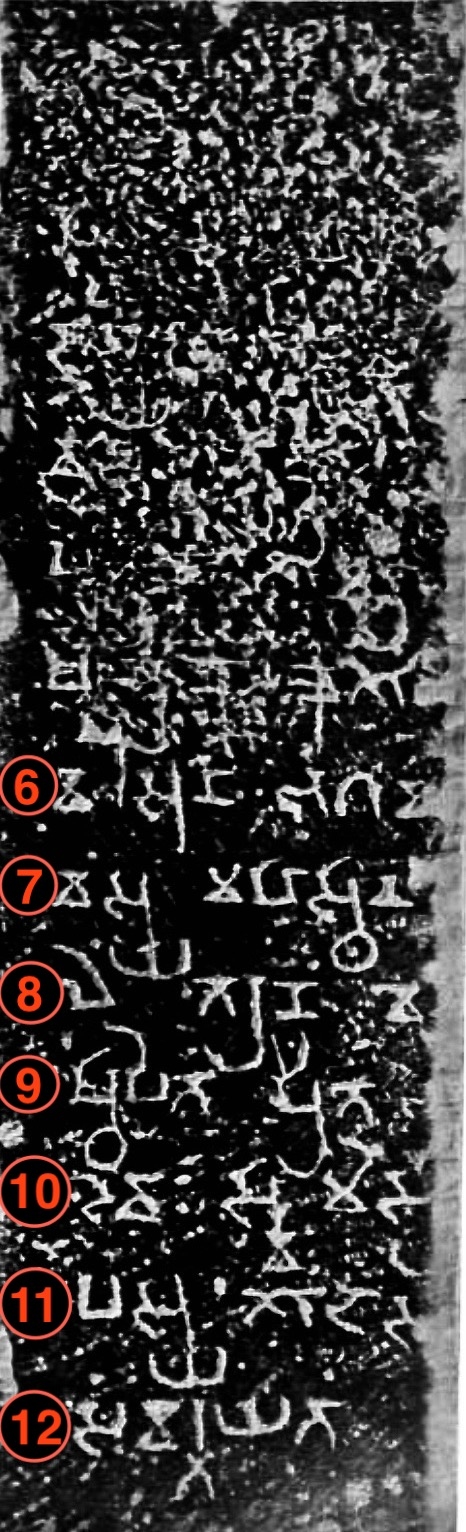
The numbered Vasu doorjamb inscription.

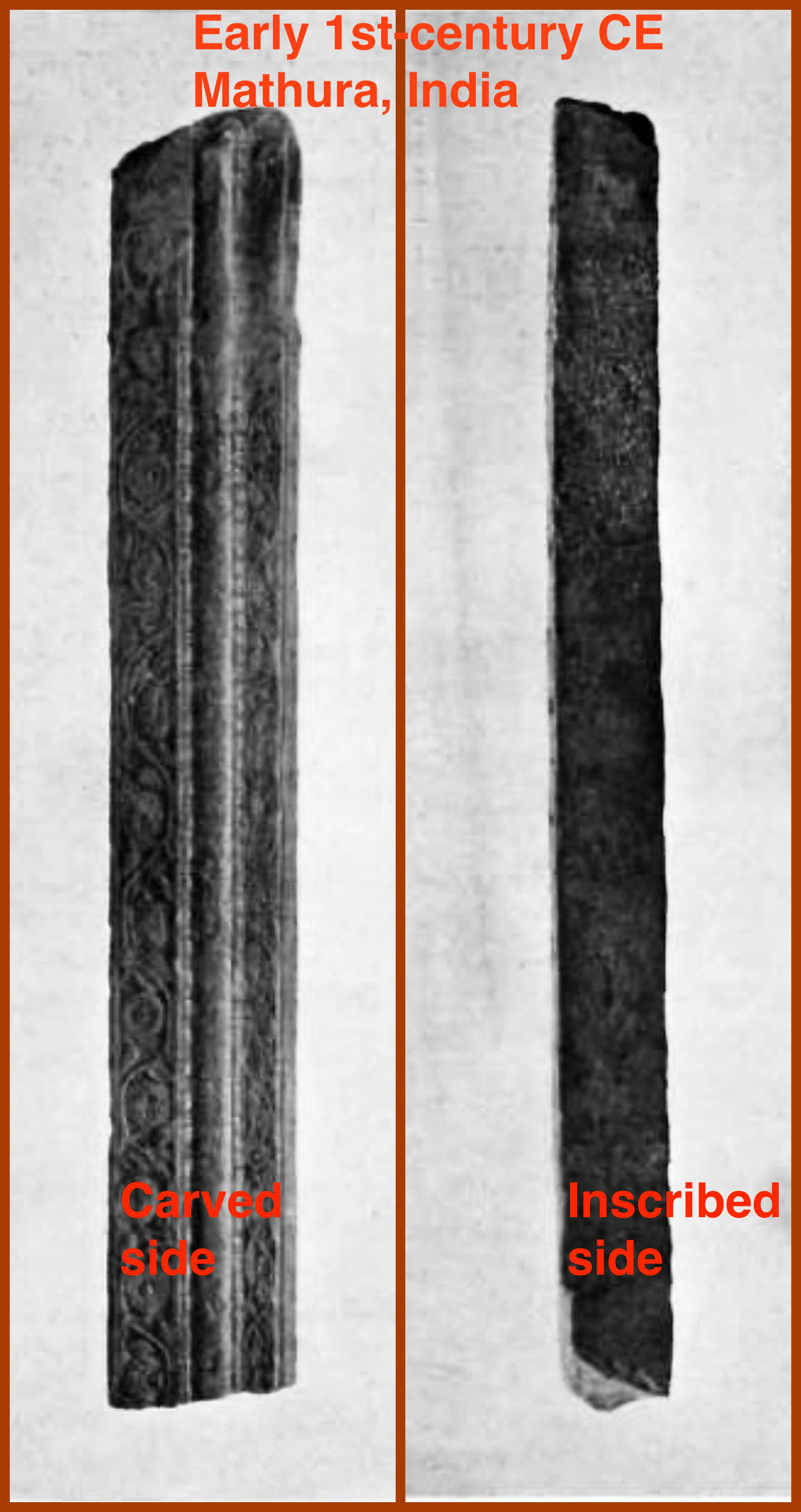
1st-century CE inscribed doorjamb, Vasu Mathura India. A modern image

The name "Vāsudeva" appears partially in the inscription, through its last two syllables "-devaḥ" (line 10).

The decipherable part confirms that a torana (gateway) and Vasu temple was established, and that this happened in the time of Sodasa thereby providing a basis to date the inscription.

According to Chakravarti, the first five lines are too damaged for any reliable translation. Further, no name can be deciphered from the inscription with complete certainty, including the donor name "Vasu" because it could be a compound name with -vasu. However, states Chakravarti, the inscription indicates that the donor had a name that is typically identified as "a Hindu name".

=== With interpolation and extrapolation ===
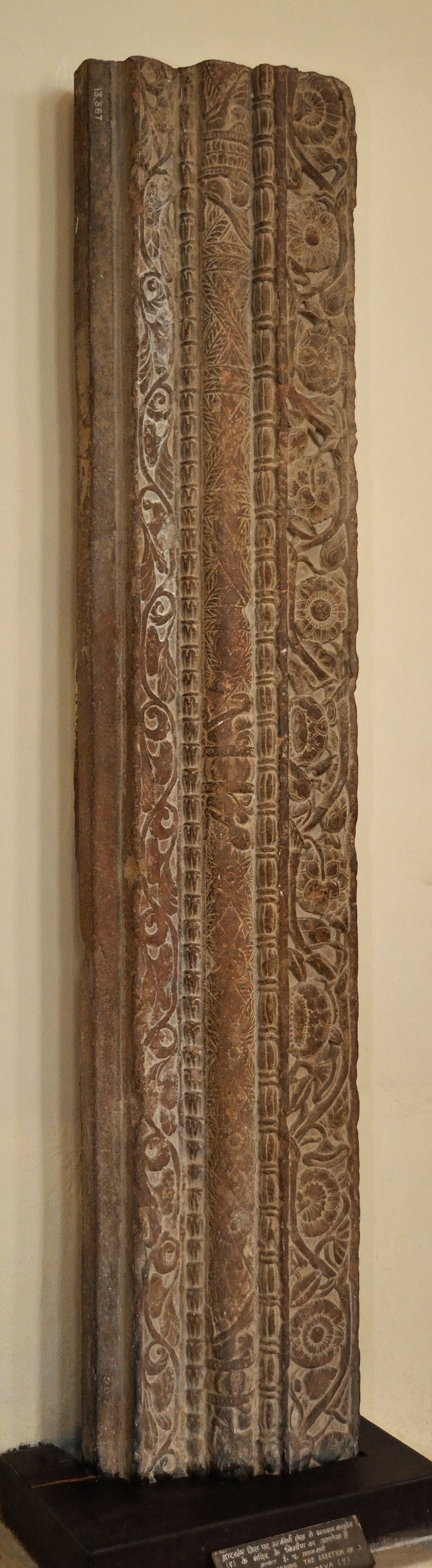
Decorated side of the Vasu doorjamb in the Mathura Museum, reference GMM 13.367. The inscription is on the back.

Luders and Janert utilized the faded characters, the context and Sanskrit grammar rules to propose a reconstruction:

1. (s)[v](amisya mahaksatrapasya Soda-) (Note: This reconstruction by Luders and Janert is consistent with the 1942 proposal of Chakravarti.)
2. sa [s]ya... (... di-)
3. [vas](e)...
4. [p]...[na] Si[v]a (...)
5. sapu[t]r[e]na kausi[ki] (putrena)
6. vasuna bhaga[va] (to vasude-)
7. vasya mahasthana (. . . sai) (Note: Ramaprasad Chanda suggests that the 7th line could be "vasya mahasthana.. [chatuhsa]".)
8. lam toranam ve(dika ca prati-)
9. sthapito prito [bha] (gavan vasu-)
10. devah svami[sya] (mahaksatra-)
11. pasya soda[sa](sya . . .)
12. samvartayatam

– Reconstructed Inscription, 1st-century CE

=== Translation of reconstructed inscription ===
Sonya Quintanilla, in 2007, translated the last seven lines as:

. . . a stone torana and railing were caused to be erected by Vasu at the . . . of the great temple of lord Vasudeva. May lord Vàsudeva, being pleased, promote (the dominion or life or vigor) of Svami Mahaksatrapa Sodasa.

Ramaprasad Chanda, in 1920, translated the same lines to:

By ... vasu a quadrangle enclosed by four buildings (chatuhsalam), a pillared gateway (toranam) and a square terrace in the middle of courtyard (vedikah) have been built (at the shrine at) the great place of the Bhagavat Vasudeva. May Vasudeva be pleased. May (the dominion) of the lord, the mahakshatrapa Sodasa, endure.

NP Chakravarti, in 1942, disagreed with Chanda's interpolation of -lam to chatuhsalam because that "term never occurs in inscriptions of this time". He suggested that an interpolation to Devakulam, or even better Sailam, is more likely. Chakravarti translated the same lines to:

... by Vasu, a gateway of stone (?) and the railing was erected at the... of the great temple of bhagavat Vasudeva. May bhagavat Vasudeva, being pleased, promote (the dominion or the life and strength) of svamin mahakshatrapa Sodasa.

== Significance ==
Vāsudeva

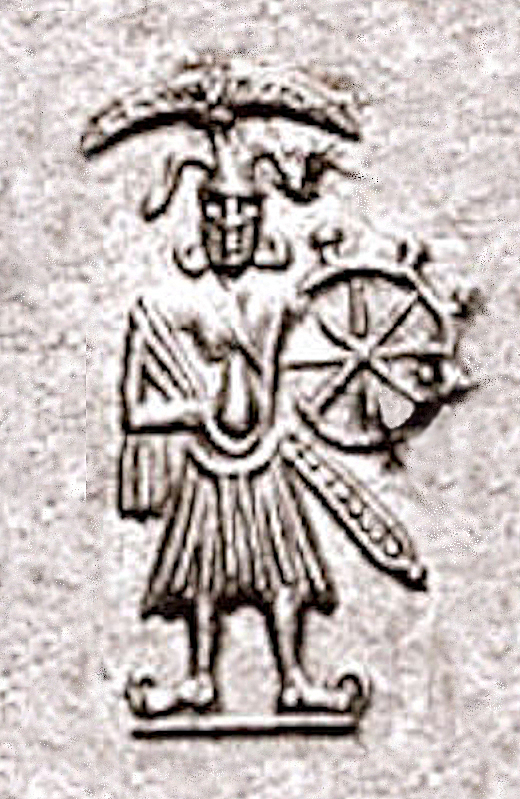
Vāsudeva with his attributes, as depicted on a coin of Agathocles of Bactria, 190-180 BCE.

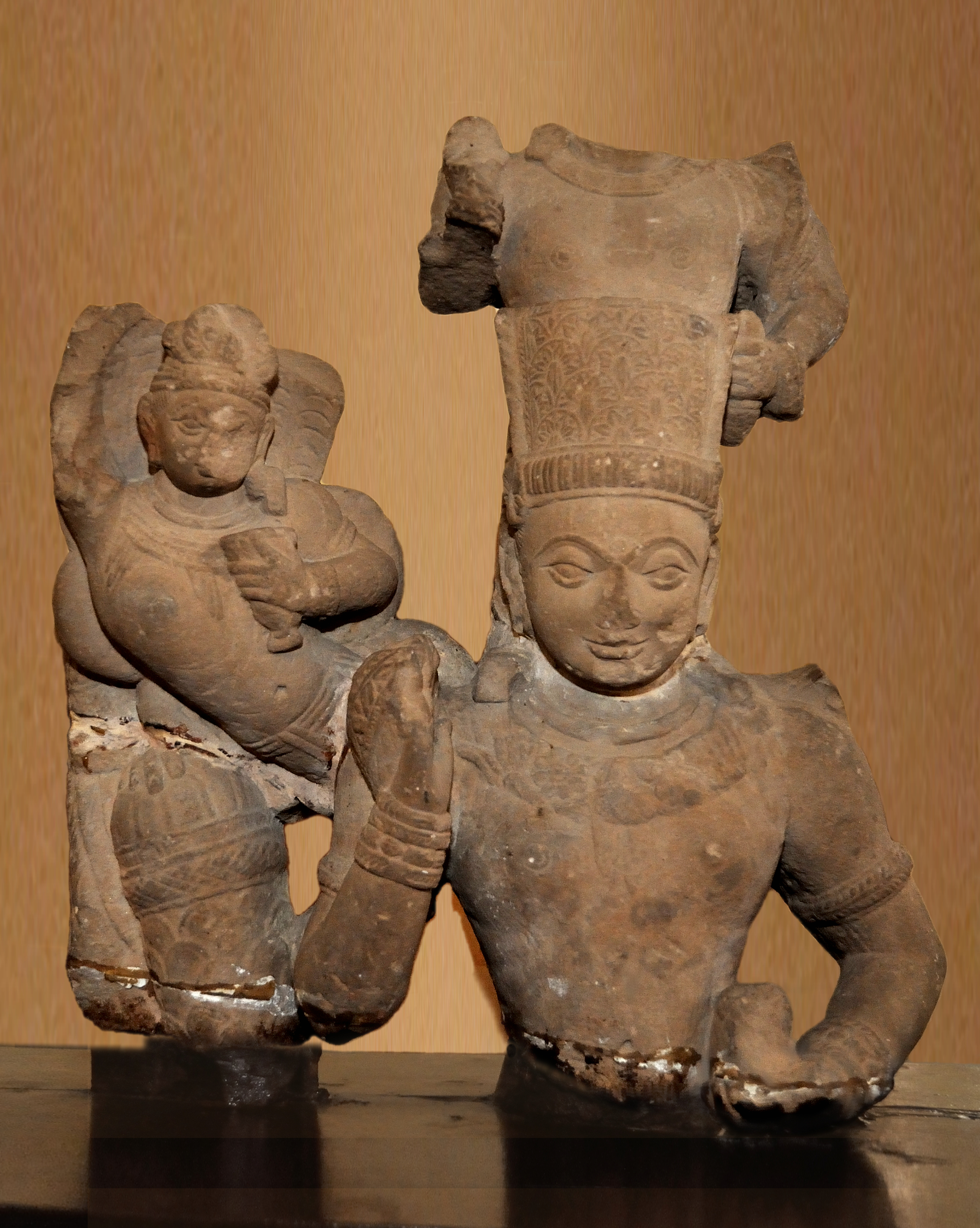
Four-armed Vāsudeva with mace and conch (center), in a Chatur-vyūha sculpture. 2nd century CE, Art of Mathura, Mathura Museum.

The Vasu Doorjamb Inscription was dedicated to deity Vāsudeva, who appears in art from the 2nd century BCE.

The Vasu Doorjamb Inscription is a significant early Sanskrit inscription from Mathura. The mention of Sodasa's time who, states Salomon, is "dated with reasonable certainty to the early early years of the first century AD". Its mention of Vasu, temple, Vedika and a torana (gateway) is significant as it confirms that the large temple building tradition was in vogue in the Mathura region by at least the start of the common era. Further, it also attests to the popularity of Vāsudeva (Krishna) tradition in this period. The Vasu Doorjamb inscription of Sodasa in Uttar Pradesh viewed with other epigraphical evidence such as the Besnagar Heliodorus pillar in Madhya Pradesh, the Hathibada Ghosundi Inscriptions in Rajasthan, and the Naneghat inscriptions in Maharashtra suggest that the cult of Vāsudeva-Krishna and early Vaishnavism had spread over a wide region by the 1st-century BCE to the start of common era.

According to Quintanilla, the Vasu Doorjamb and the inscription is "one of the most important and most beautiful objects" from the time of Sodasa, likely from a "temple to Vāsudeva", another name for Vishnu. The carvings on the doorjamb are three woven compositions. It has a leafy vine that runs along the length of the red sandstone jamb. Along the stem of the vine are curling leaves and blossoms, that wrap along as those found in nature, a rosette added in where the intertwining vines meet. The wider band has lotus rhizome carved in, with subtle naturalistic variations, wherein the lotus flowers are shown in all their stages of bloom, states Quintanilla.

== See also ==
- Hathibada Ghosundi Inscriptions
- Heliodorus pillar
- Mora Well Inscription
- Nana Ghat Inscription
