= Mountain Temple inscription =

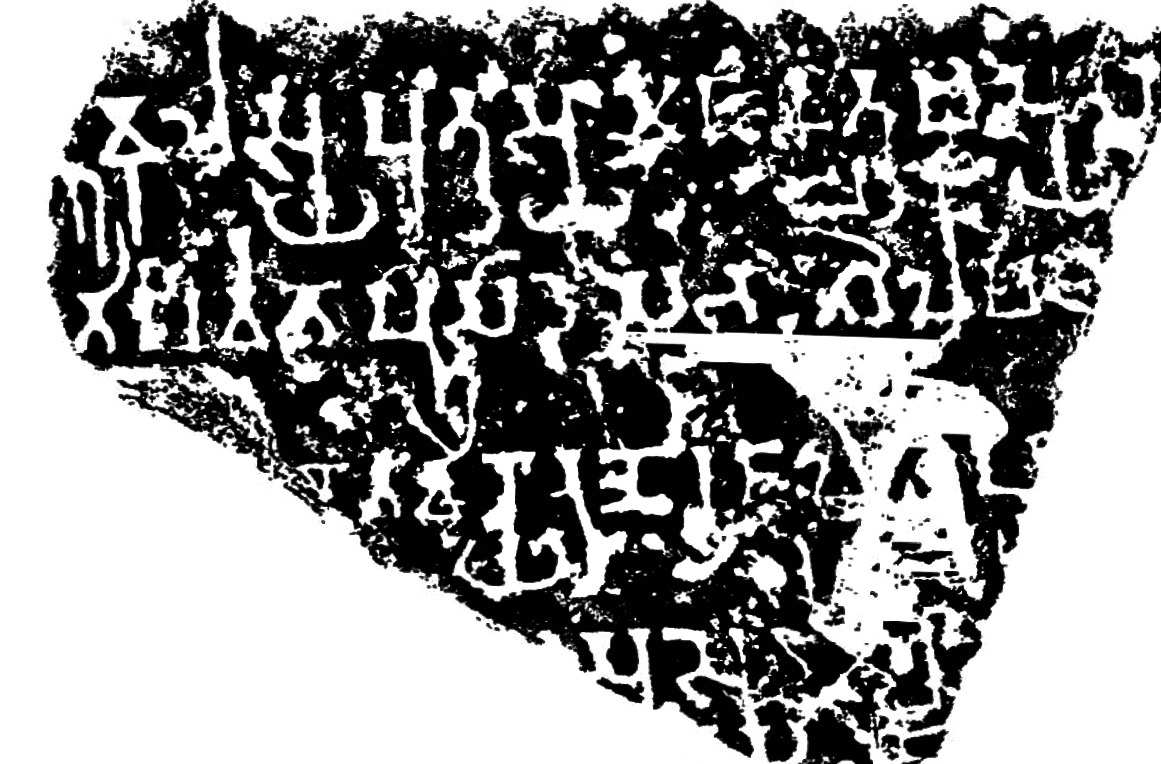
- Ancient Sanskrit inscription Indian Museum, Kolkata
- Writing: Sanskrit
- Created: ~ 1st Century CE
- Place: Mathura, Uttar Pradesh
- Present location: Indian Museum, Kolkata
- Identification: NS 6482
- Mathura (India)

The Mountain Temple inscription was found near Mathura, India. It is on a broken slab, and now housed at the Indian Museum, Kolkata.

The Mountain Temple inscription makes an early mention of Hindu and Jain temple architecture, where its shape is described to be like a mountain and accompanied with an assembly hall (sabha). The inscription's wording and arrangement, state Luders and Janert, closely resembles the Mora Well inscription, now in Mathura museum. Both describe a donation of a stone temple, halls and slabs; however, the Mora Well inscription is more detailed and mentions pratima. The Rajula in line 3 of the Mountain Temple inscription is likely the Northern Satraps Great Satrap Rajuvula, found in Mathura lion capital.

The Mountain Temple inscription lacks a date. The similar Mora Well Inscription is dated to the early decades of the 1st-century CE and is related to early Vaishnavism: the Mora Well inscription mentions stone shrines dedicated to five Vrishni heroes.

== Inscription ==
The discovered inscription is incomplete, in not quite correct Sanskrit. It reads:

1. . . . uvulasya putrasya mahaksatrapasya so ...
2. . . . ti parvato prasade(or do) sabha silapata ...
3. . . . taviryo rane rajulas ca pi[ta] ...
4. . . . sasyedam arca ...

== Translation ==
Sonya Quintanilla translates it as,

. . . of the mahaksatrapasya So(dasa), son of (Raj)uvula . . .
a temple like a mountain, an assembly hall, stone slabs...
whose heroism in battle, and (his) father Rajula . . .
this . . . of his is adored.
