= Sodasa =

- Indo-Scythian Northern Satraps king
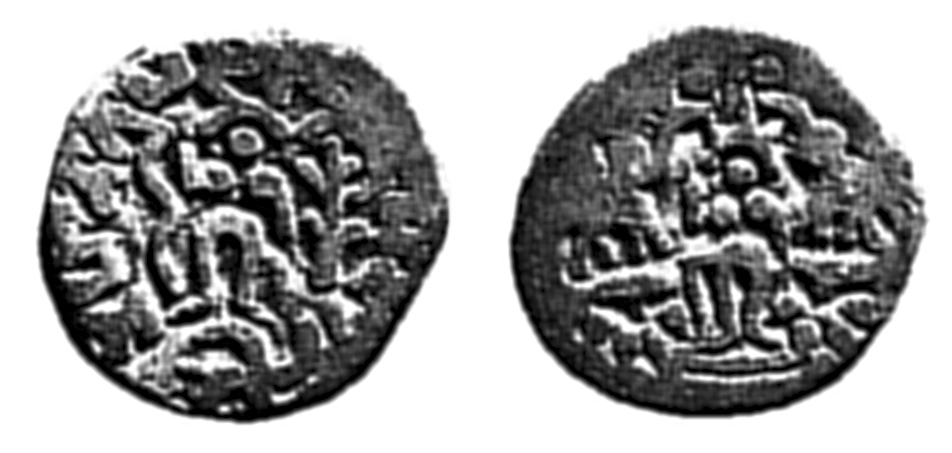
- Coin of Sodasa from Mathura. Obv: Standing female and tree-like symbol. "Mahakatapasa putasa Khatapasa Sodasa" ie "Satrap Sodasa, son of the Great Satrap". Rev: Lakshmi with elephants pouring water over her.
- Reign: c. 15 CE
- Predecessor: Rajuvula
- Father: Rajuvula
- Mother: Kamuia Ayasa
- Religion: Jainism

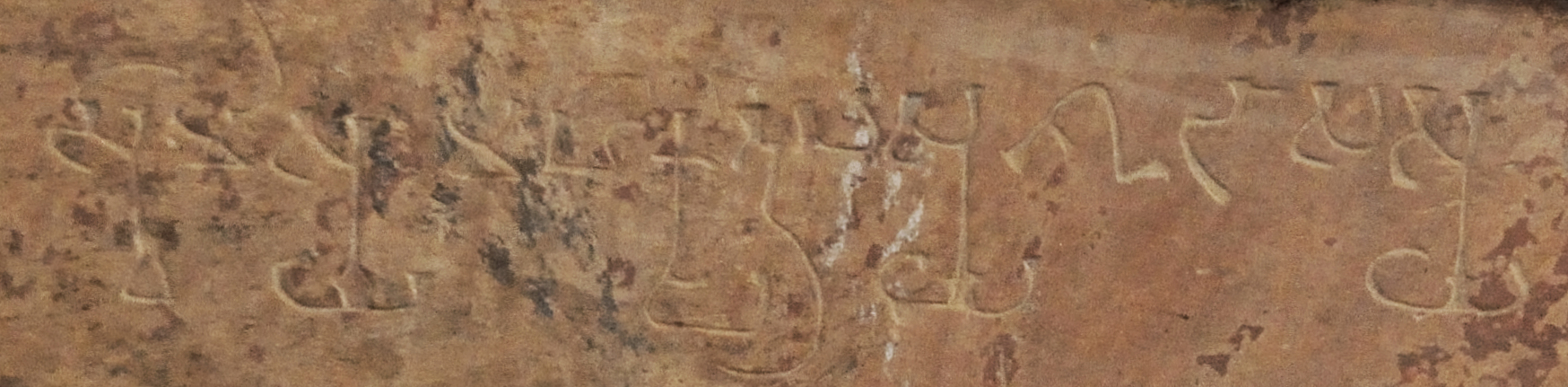
Regnal title of Sodasa in the Mirzapur stele inscription, vicinity of Mathura. (Middle Brahmi script): Svāmisya Mahakṣatrapasya Śudasasya "Of the Lord and Great Satrap Śudāsa"

Sodasa (Kharosthi: 𐨭𐨂𐨜𐨯 Śu-ḍa-sa, Śuḍasa; Middle Brahmi script: Śo-dā-sa, Śodāsa, also Śu-dā-sa, Śudāsa) was an Indo-Scythian Northern Satrap and ruler of Mathura during the later part of the 1st century BCE or the early part of 1st century CE. He was the son of Rajuvula, the Great Satrap of the region from Taxila to Mathura. He is mentioned in the Mathura lion capital.

== Name ==
Sodasa's name is recorded in Kharosthi as Śuḍasa (𐨭𐨂𐨜𐨯) and in Brahmi as Śodāsa and Śudāsa, which are derived from the Saka name *Śudāsa, meaning "who kept the good acts in memory".

== Rule ==
Sodasa reigned during the 1st century CE, and also took the title of Great Satrap at one point, probably in the area of Mathura as well, but possibly under the suzerainty of the Indo-Parthian king Gondophares. At the same time the Indo-Scythian Bhadayasa ruled in the eastern Punjab. There were numerous cultural and political exchanges between the Indo-Scythians of the northwest and those of Mathura.

Sodasa may have been a contemporary of the Western Kshatrapa Nahapana and the Indo-Parthian Gondophares. The Indo-Parthians may have destabilized Indo-Scythian rule in northern India, but there are no traces of Indo-Parthian presence in Mathura. Sodasa may have been displaced in Mathura by the Kushan ruler Vima Kadphises, who erected a throne in his name in Mathura, but nothing is known of these interactions.

At Mathura, Sodasa is the last of the Indo-Scythians to have left coins. Later, under Kanishka, son of Vima Kadphises, the Great Satrap Kharapallana and the Satrap Vanaspara are said to have ruled in Mathura with Kanishka as suzerain, pointing to continued Indo-Scythian rule under Kushan suzerainty as least until the time of Kanishka.

== Inscriptions ==
Numerous inscriptions from Mathura mentioning Sodasa's rule are known. The Mirzapur village inscription (in the vicinity of Mathura) refers to the erection of a water tank by Mulavasu and his consort Kausiki during the reign of Sodasa, assuming the title of "Svami (Lord) Mahakshatrapa (Great Satrap)".

The Mathura lion capital mentions the reign of his father and predecessor Rajuvula as Mahaksatrapa while Sodasa is referred to as Ksatrapa. Sodasa probably also dedicated the Mora Well Inscription, where he presents himself as the son of Rajuvula.

A large stone slab, the Kankali Tila tablet of Sodasa, discovered in Kankali in the area of Mathura, bears a three-line epigraph mentioning that in the year 42 or 72 of "Lord Mahaksatrapa Sodasa," a monument for worship was set up by a certain Amohini. A recent date for Sodasa's reign was given as 15 CE, meaning that the regnal date of the inscription would start from the Vikrama era (Bikrami calendar (starting in 57 BCE)+72=15 CE). This would put the long reign of his father Rajuvula in the last quarter of the 1st century BCE, which is probable.

Another inscription of Sodasa in Mathura records the gifts of a Brahman named Gajavara of the Segrava-gotra during the time of Saudasa the Great Satrap of the lord (paramount, whose name is lost) of tanks called Kshayawada, as well as a western tank, a well, a garden, and a pillar.

Mathura inscription mentioning the rule of Sodasa as Kshatrapa (Satrap) or Mahakshatrapa (Great Satrap).

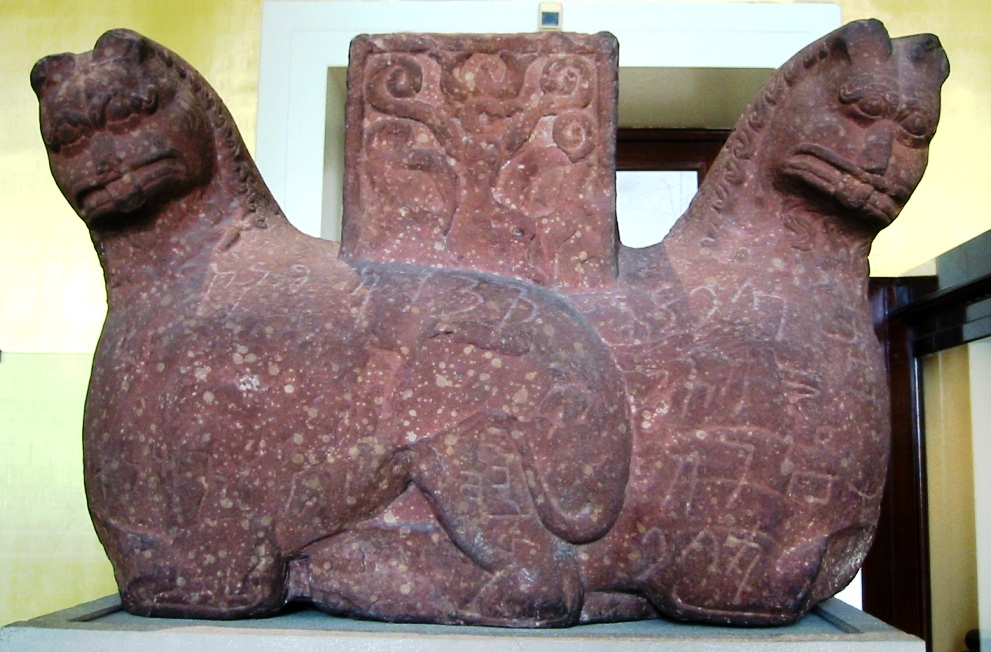
The Mathura lion capital mentions Sodasa as "Satrap", while his father Rajuvula was "Great Satrap".

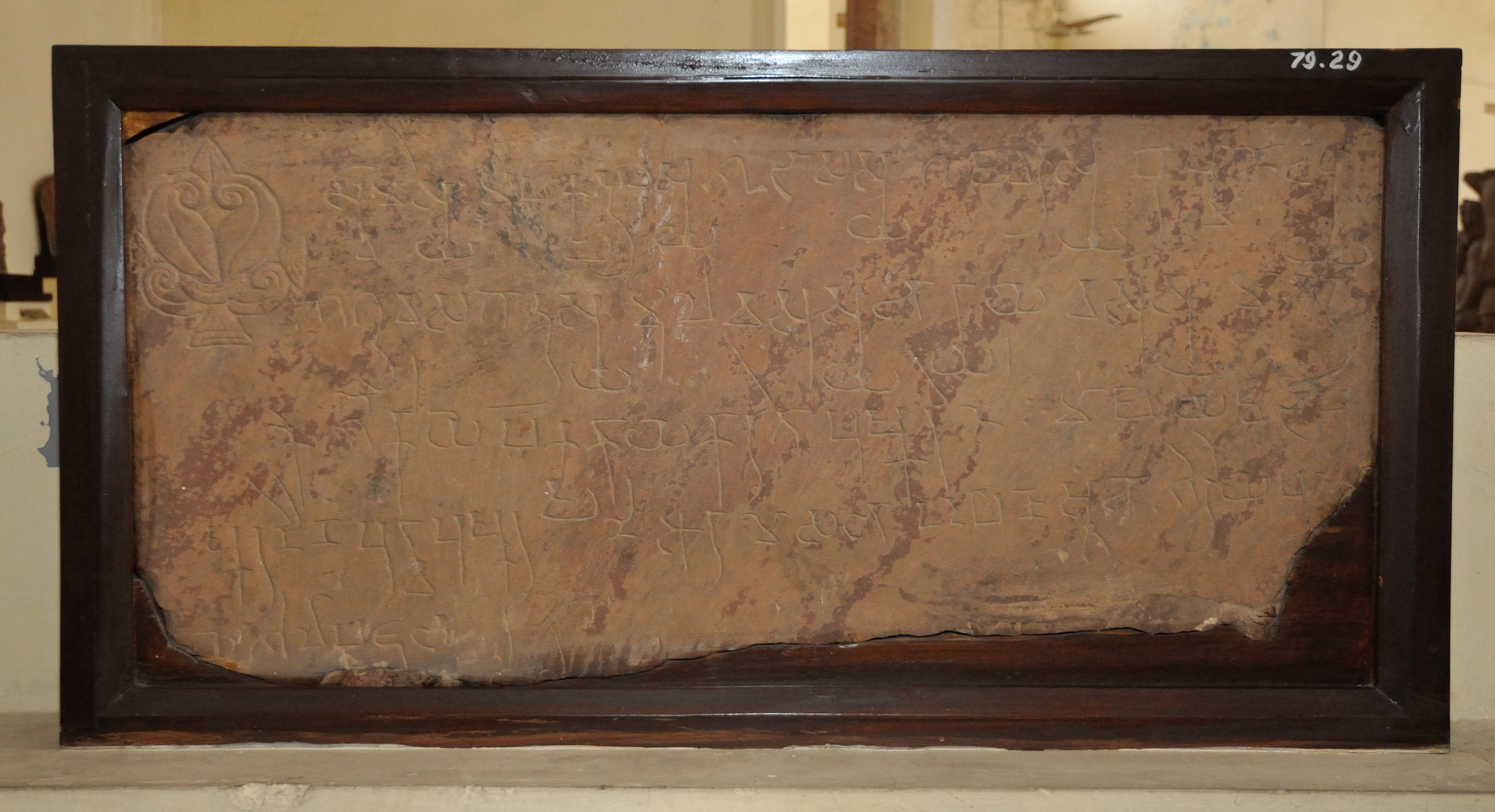
Mirzapur stele inscription of Sodasa's Reign, Mirzapur area of Mathura. Mathura Museum. The inscription refers to the erection of a water tank by Mulavasu and his consort Kausiki, during the reign of Sodasa, assuming the title of "Svami (Lord) Mahakshatrapa (Great Satrap)":

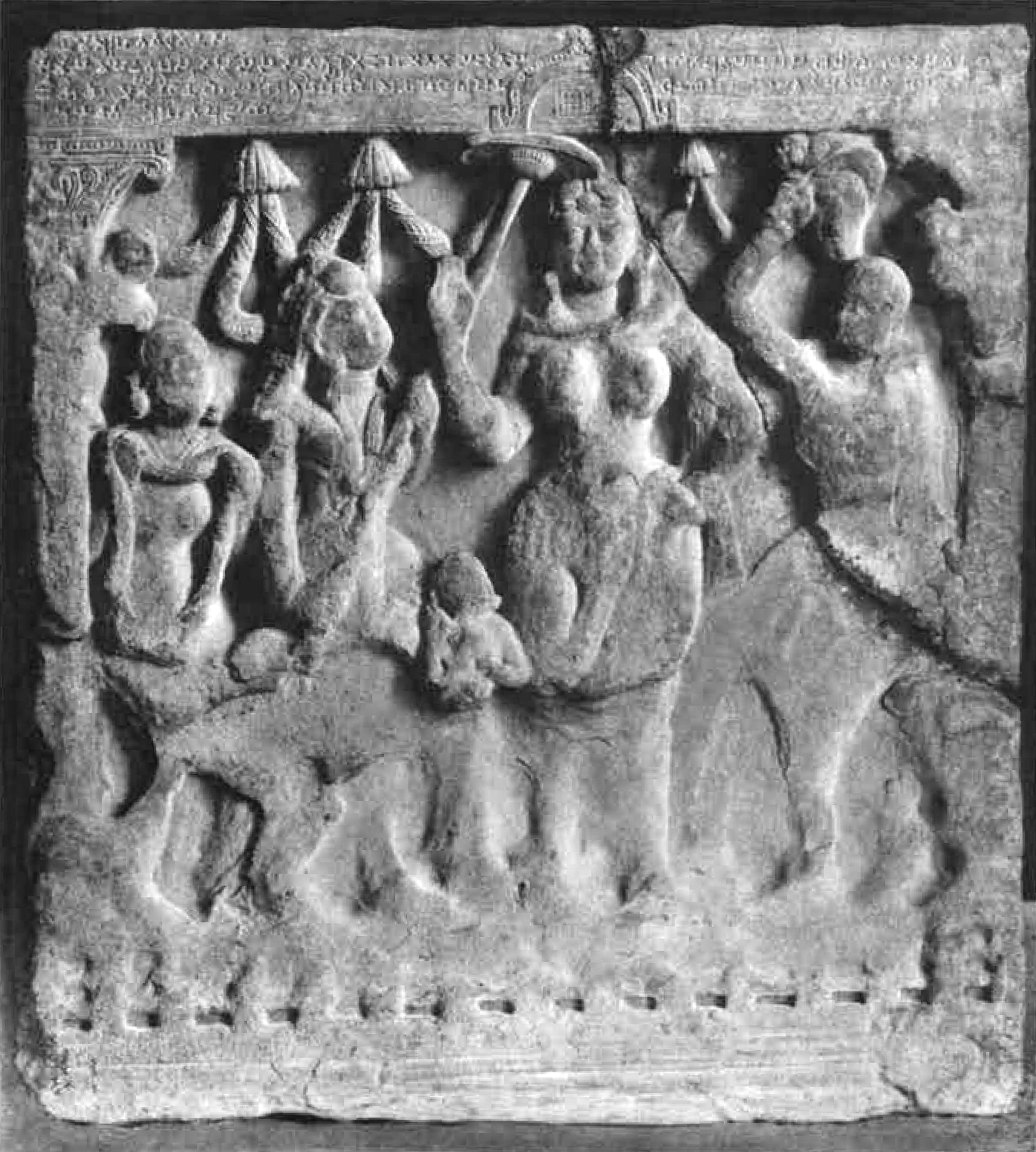
The Kankali Tila tablet of Sodasa with an inscription mentioning the year 42 or 72 during the reign of Sodasa as Makakshatrapa (Great Satrap).

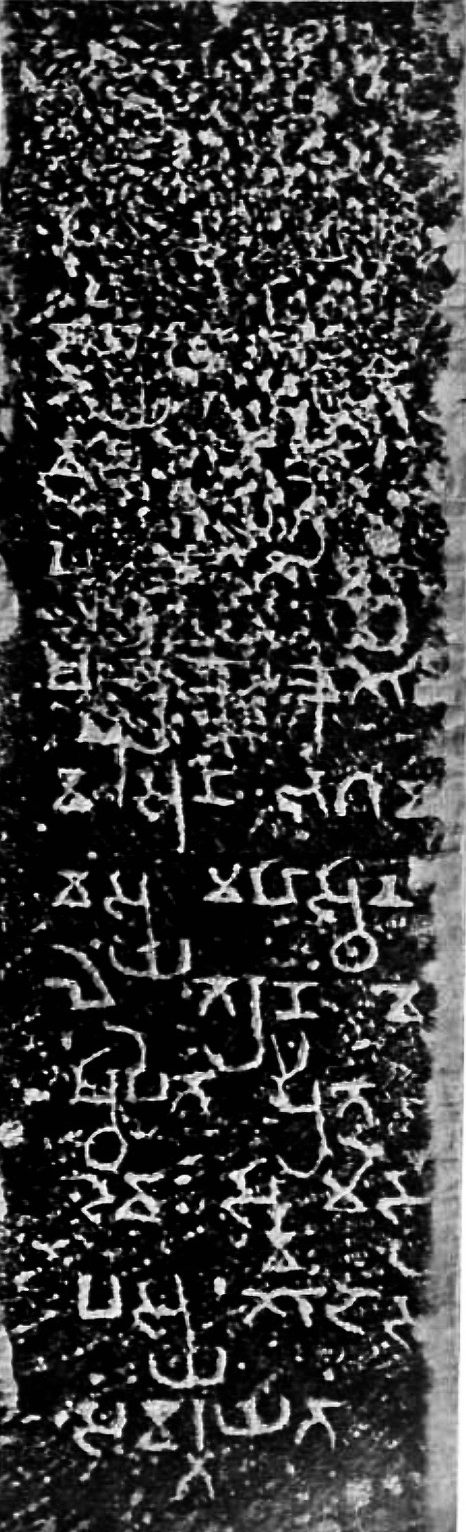
The Vasu Doorjamb Inscription.
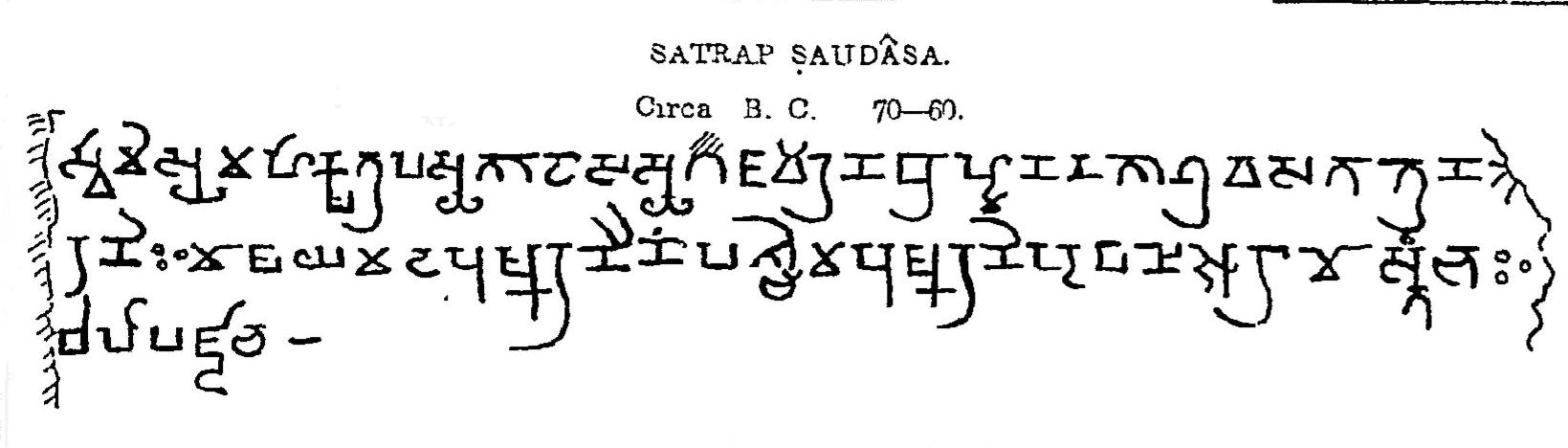
Another inscription of Sodasa in Mathura. This inscription records the gifts of a Brahman named Gajavara of the Segrava-gotra during the time of Saudasa the Great Satrap of the lord (paramount, whose name is lost) of tanks called Kshayawada, besides a western tank, a well, a garden, and a pillar.

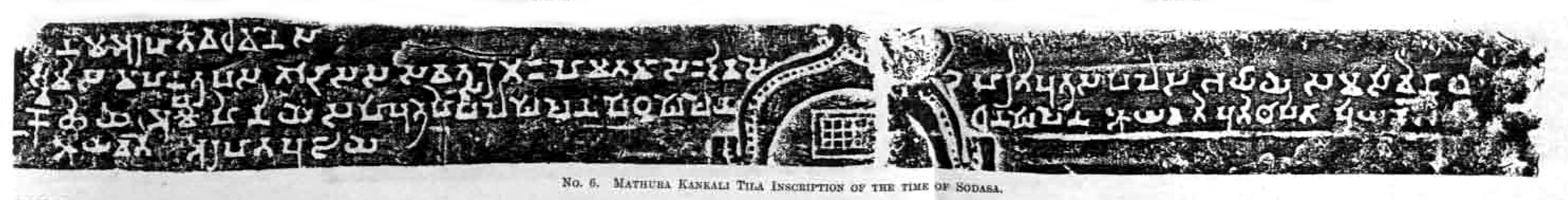
Kankali Tila inscription of Sodasa (from the Kankali Tila tablet of Sodasa). This inscription mentions the rule of Svamisa Mahakṣatrapasa Śodasa ( "Of the Lord and Great Satrap Śudāsa") from the beginning of the second line.

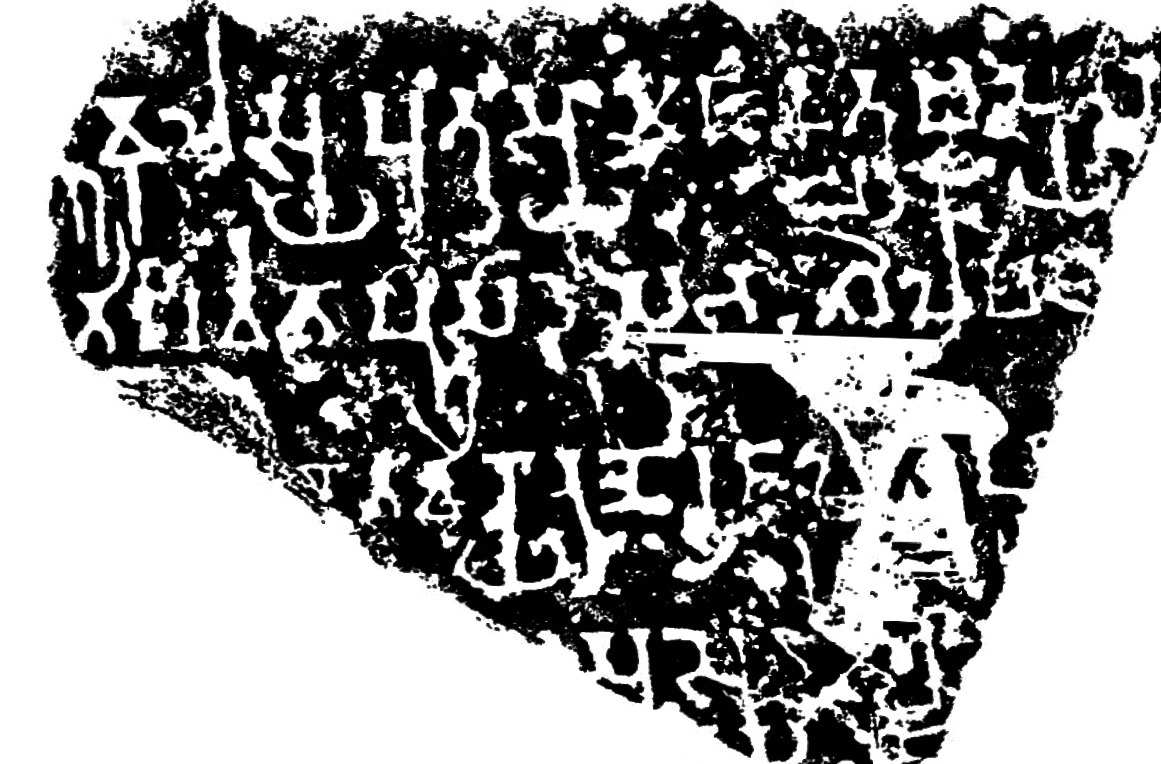
Mountain Temple inscription mentioning Sodasa and his father Rajuvula

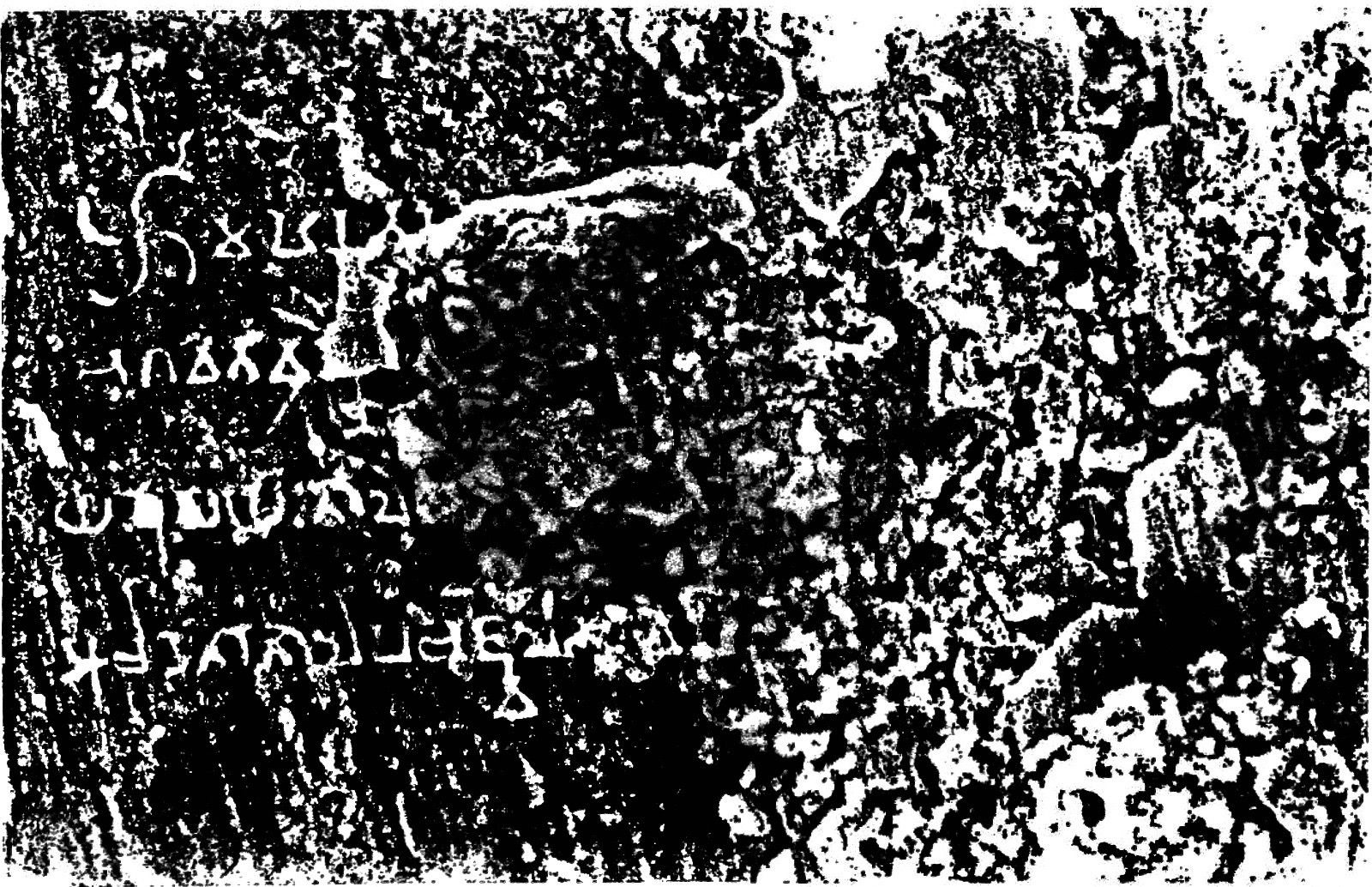
Mora Well Inscription in the name of Rajuvula and his son Sodasa.

== Coinage ==
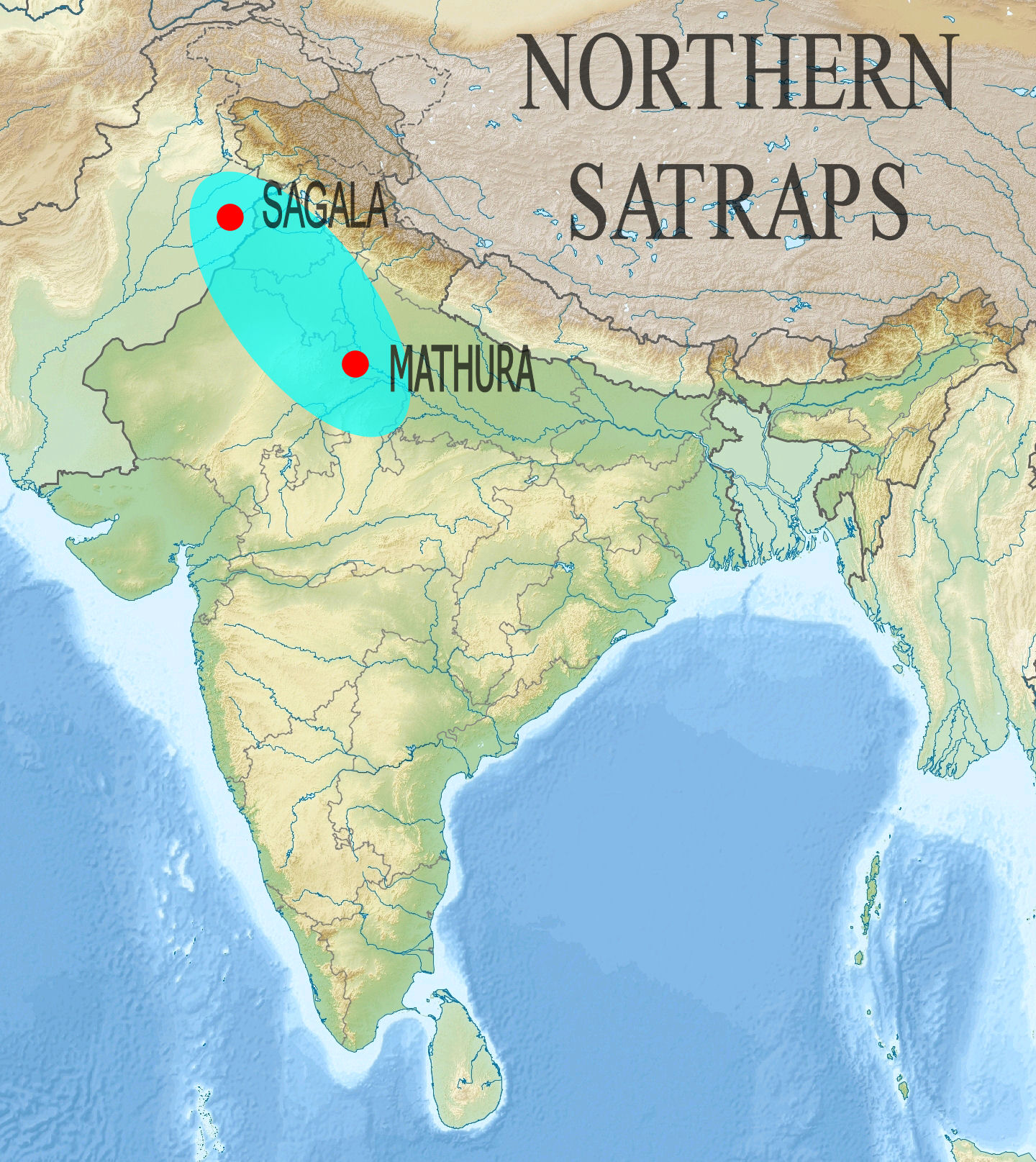
Sodasa ruled in the Mathura portion of the Northern Satraps territory.

Sodasa's coins have been found in Mathura only, suggesting that he only ruled over the Mathura region. They do not follow traditional Indo-Scythian coinage patterns, but rather the designs of local rulers of Mathura, and are only made of lead and copper alloy. The legends only use the Indian Brahmi script, whether Saodasa's father Rajuvula had used coins derived from the Indo-Greeks, with legends in Greek and Kharoshthi. This suggests that Sodasa had significantly integrated into the local Indian culture.

Sodasa's coins usually show on the obverse a standing female and tree-like symbol, with the legend "Mahakatapasa putasa Khatapasa Sodasa", i.e., "Satrap Sodasa, son of the Great Satrap". On the reverse appears a Lakshmi with elephants pouring water over her.

Three types of legends are known, with one coin type of Sodasa bearing the legend "son of Rajuvula":

- "Satrap Sodasa, son of the Great Satrap" (Mahakhatapasa putasa khatapasa śodasasa followed by a svastika)
- "Satrap Sodasa, son of Rajuvula" (Svastika followed by Rajuvula putasa khatapasa śodasasa)
- "Great Satrap Sodasa" (Mahakhatapasa śodasasa)
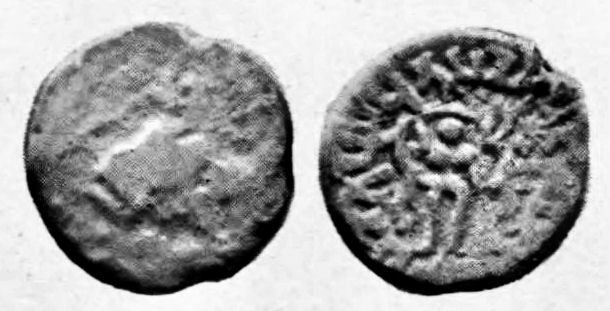
Coin of Sodasa. Reverse: "Mahakshatrapa putasa Khatapasa Sodasasa" ("Satrap Sodasa, son of the Great Satrap")

Coin of Sodasa, satrap of Mathura, AE.
Obv: Lakshmi standing between two symbols on the obverse and inscription around "Mahakhatapasa putasa Khatapasa Sodasasa ".
Rev: Standing Abhiseka Lakshmi anointed by two elephants.

== Sculptural styles ==
Sculpture under Sodasa

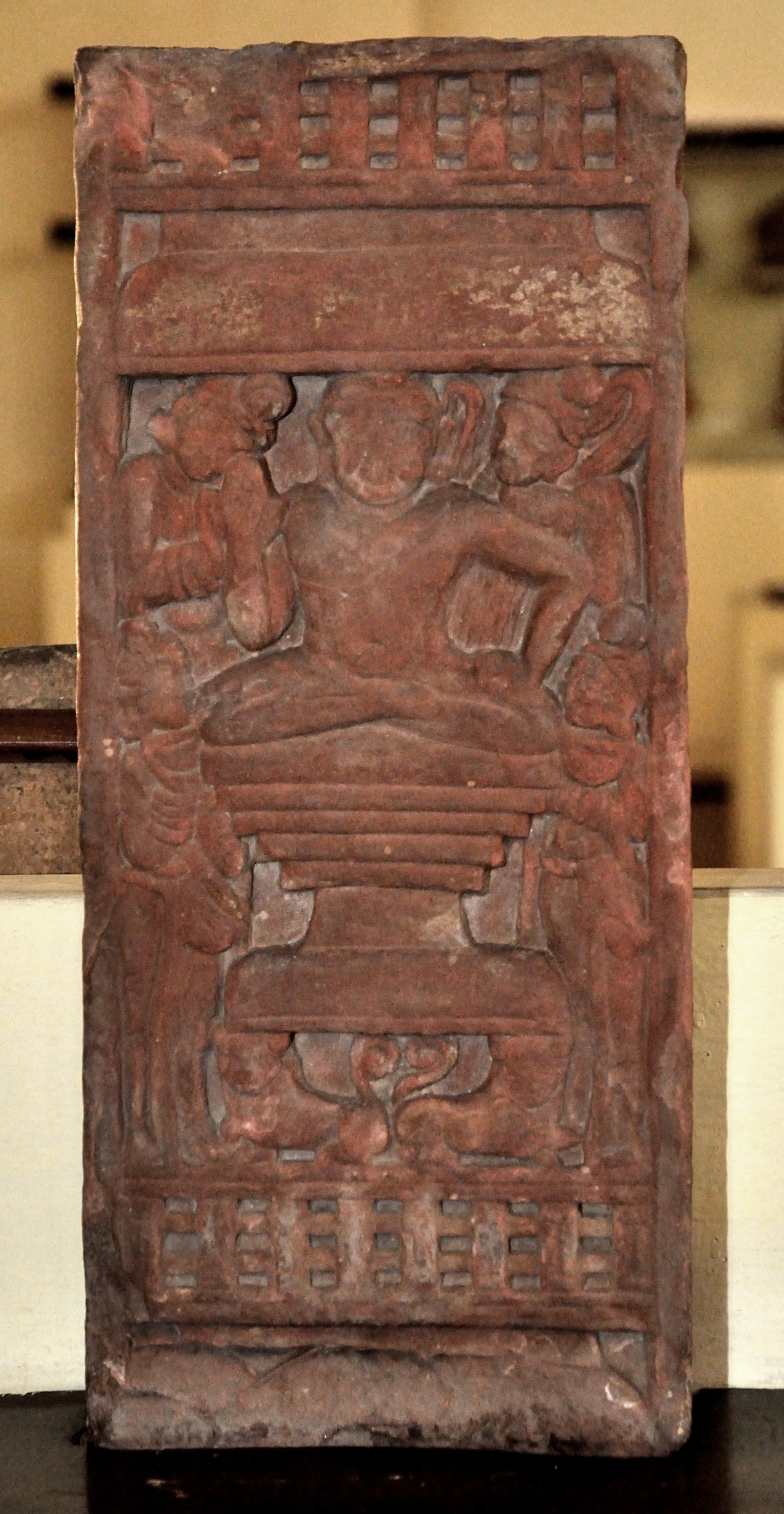
The "Isapur Buddha", probably the earliest known representation of the Buddha (possibly together with Buddha statues found in Butkara in Swat), on a railing post, dated to circa 15 CE.

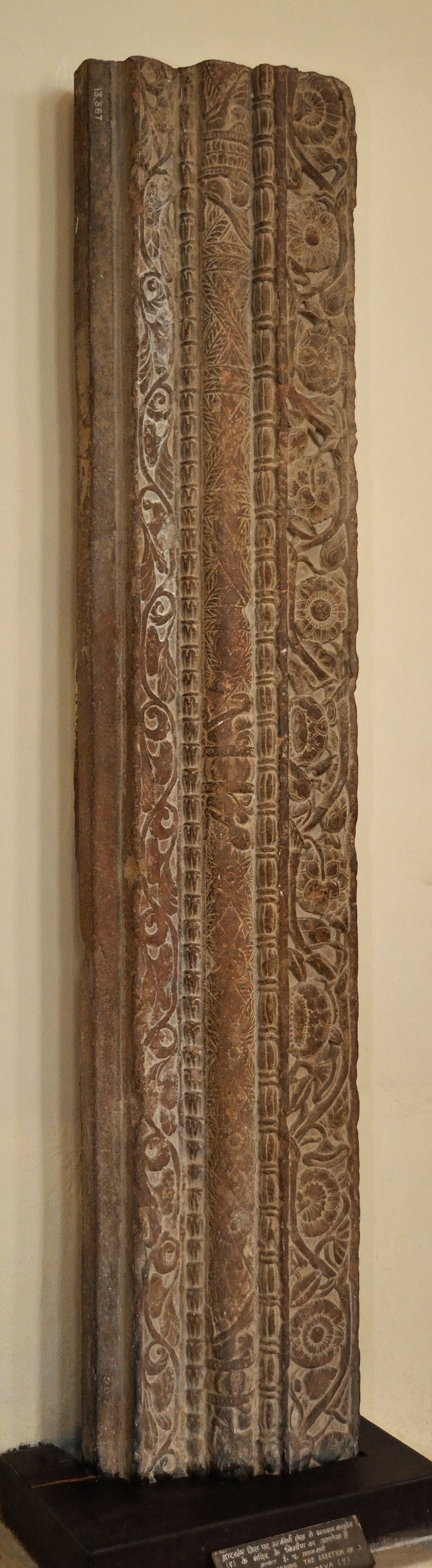
The Vasu doorjamb is beautifully carved and has an inscription in the name of Sodasa, 15 CE.

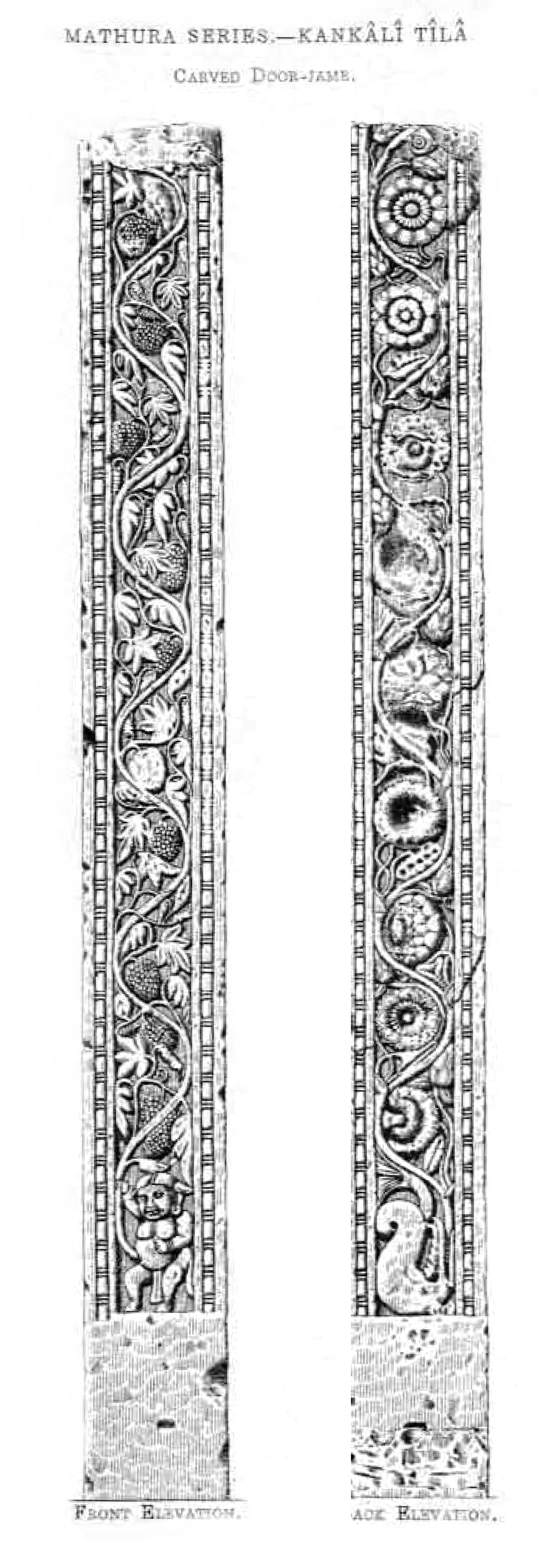
The similar and contemporary Mora doorjamb, from the Jain mount of Kankali Tila in Mathura, 15 CE.

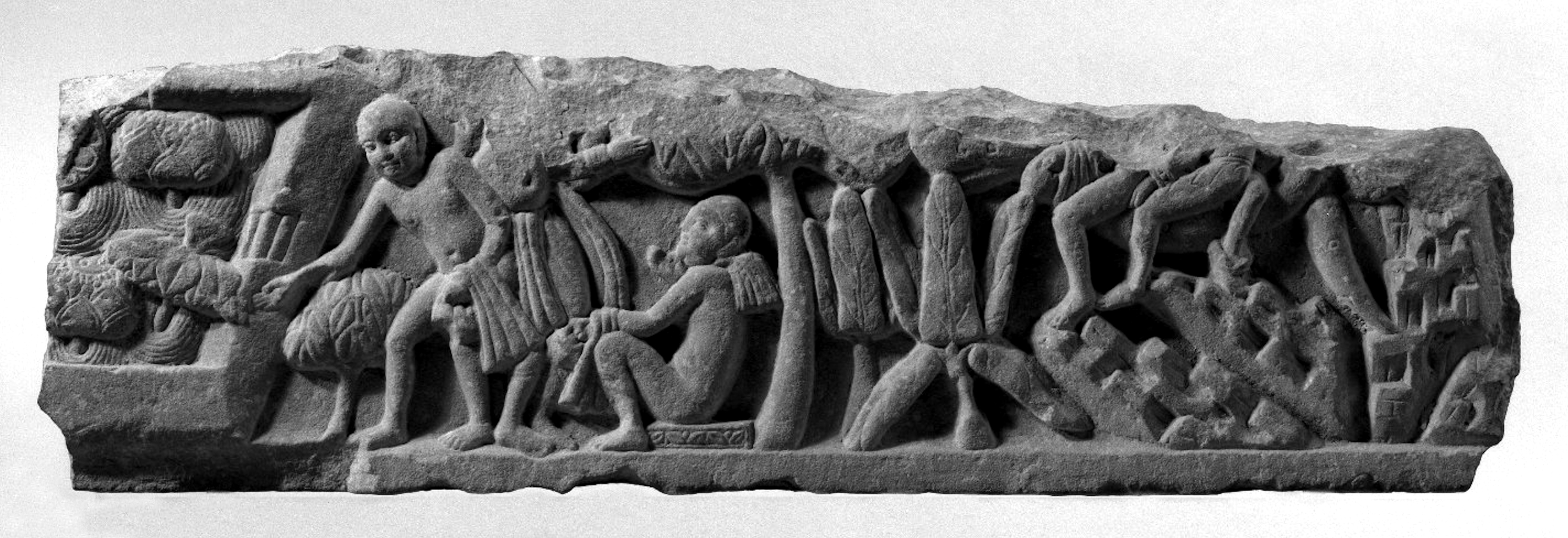
Jain narrative relief panel showing Jain monks of the ardhaphalaka sect, near a water pool. Early 1st century CE, reign of Sodasa, Mathura. Brooklyn Museum 87.188.5.

The abundance of dedicatory inscriptions in the name of Sodasa (eight of them are known, often on sculptural works), and the fact that Sodasa is known through his coinage as well as through his relations with other Indo-Scythian rulers whose dates are known, means that Sodasa functions as a historic marker to ascertain the sculptural styles at Mathura during his rule, in the first half of the 1st century CE. The next historical marker corresponds to the reign of Kanishka under the Kushans, whose reign began circa 127 CE.

The Kankali Tila tablet of Sodasa is one of those sculptural works directly inscribed in the name of Sodasa. Another one is the Katra torana fragment. The sculptural styles at Mathura during the reign of Sodasa are quite distinctive, and significantly different from the style of the previous period circa 50 BCE, or the styles of the later period of the Kushan Empire in the 2nd century CE. Stylistically similar works can then be dated to the same period of the reign of Sodasa.

=== Early representation of the Buddha ===
The "Isapur Buddha" from Mathura, probably the earliest known representation of the Buddha (possibly together with Buddha statues found in Barikot in Swat), on a railing post, is dated to circa 15 CE under the reign of Sodasa. Another depiction of the Buddha from the same period appears in the Bimaran casket.

== Paleography ==
The inscriptions in the name of Sodasa are also an important marker for the paleography of the Brahmi script, the shape of the Brahmi letters having evolved in time, and also having varied depending on the regions.

Territories/ dates	Western India	Western Pakistan Balochistan	Paropamisadae Arachosia	Bajaur	Gandhara	Western Punjab	Eastern Punjab	Mathura
			INDO-GREEK KINGDOM					
90–85 BCE			Nicias	Menander II		Artemidoros		
90–70 BCE			Hermaeus	Archebius				
85-60 BCE			INDO-SCYTHIAN KINGDOM; Maues					
75–70 BCE			Vonones; Spalahores	Telephos		Apollodotus II		
65–55 BCE			Spalirises; Spalagadames			Hippostratos	Dionysios	
55–35 BCE			Azes I				Zoilos II	
55–35 BCE			Azilises; Azes II				Apollophanes	Indo-Scythian dynasty of the NORTHERN SATRAPS; Hagamasha
25 BCE – 10 CE				Indo-Scythian dynasty of the APRACHARAJAS; Vijayamitra (ruled 12 BCE - 15 CE) (Note: From the dated inscription on the Rukhana reliquary)	Liaka Kusulaka; Patika Kusulaka; Zeionises	Kharahostes (ruled 10 BCE– 10 CE) (Note: An Inscribed Silver Buddhist Reliquary of the Time of King Kharaosta and Prince Indravarman, Richard Salomon, Journal of the American Oriental Society, Vol. 116, No. 3 (Jul. - Sep., 1996), pp. 442); Mujatria	Strato II and Strato III	Hagana
10-20 CE		INDO-PARTHIAN KINGDOM; Gondophares		Indravasu	INDO-PARTHIAN KINGDOM; Gondophares		Rajuvula	
20-30 CE			Ubouzanes; Pakores	Vispavarma (ruled c.0-20 CE) (Note: A Kharosthī Reliquary Inscription of the Time of the Apraca Prince Visnuvarma, by Richard Salomon, South Asian Studies 11 1995, Pages 27-32, Published online: 09 Aug 2010)	Sarpedones		Bhadayasa	Sodasa
30-40 CE			KUSHAN EMPIRE; Kujula Kadphises	Indravarma	Abdagases		...	...
40-45 CE				Aspavarma	Gadana		...	...
45-50 CE				Sasan	Sases		...	...
50-75 CE							...	...
75-100 CE	Indo-Scythian dynasty of the WESTERN SATRAPS; Chastana		Vima Takto				...	...
100-120 CE	Abhiraka		Vima Kadphises				...	...
120 CE	Bhumaka; Nahapana	PARATARAJAS; Yolamira	Kanishka I				Great Satrap Kharapallana and Satrap Vanaspara for Kanishka I	
130-230 CE	Jayadaman; Rudradaman I Damajadasri I Jivadaman; Rudrasimha I Satyadaman; Jivadaman; Rudrasena I	Bagamira; Arjuna; Hvaramira; Mirahvara	Vāsishka (c. 140 – c. 160); Huvishka (c. 160 – c. 190); Vasudeva I (c. 190 – to at least 230)					
230-280 CE	Samghadaman; Damasena; Damajadasri II; Viradaman; Isvaradatta; Yasodaman I Vijayasena; Damajadasri III; Rudrasena II; Visvasimha	Miratakhma; Kozana; Bhimarjuna; Koziya; Datarvharna; Datarvharna	INDO-SASANIANS; Ardashir I, Sassanid king and "Kushanshah" (c. 230 – 250); Peroz I, "Kushanshah" (c. 250 – 265); Hormizd I, "Kushanshah" (c. 265 – 295)			Kanishka II (c. 230 – 240); Vashishka (c. 240 – 250); Kanishka III (c. 250 – 275)		
280-300 CE	Bhratadarman	Datayola II	Hormizd II, "Kushanshah" (c. 295 – 300)			Vasudeva II (c. 275 – 310)		
300-320 CE	Visvasena; Rudrasimha II; Jivadaman		Peroz II, "Kushanshah" (c. 300 – 325)			Vasudeva III; Vasudeva IV; Vasudeva V Chhu (c. 310? – 325)		
320-388 CE	Yasodaman II; Rudradaman II; Rudrasena III; Simhasena; Rudrasena IV		Shapur II Sassanid king and "Kushanshah" (c. 325); Varhran I, Varhran II, Varhran III "Kushanshahs" (c. 325 – 350); Peroz III "Kushanshah" (c. 350 –360); HEPHTHALITE/ HUNAS invasions			Shaka I (c. 325 – 345); Kipunada (c. 345 – 375)		GUPTA EMPIRE; Chandragupta I Samudragupta
388-395 CE	Rudrasimha III		Chandragupta II					
