= Bala Bodhisattva =

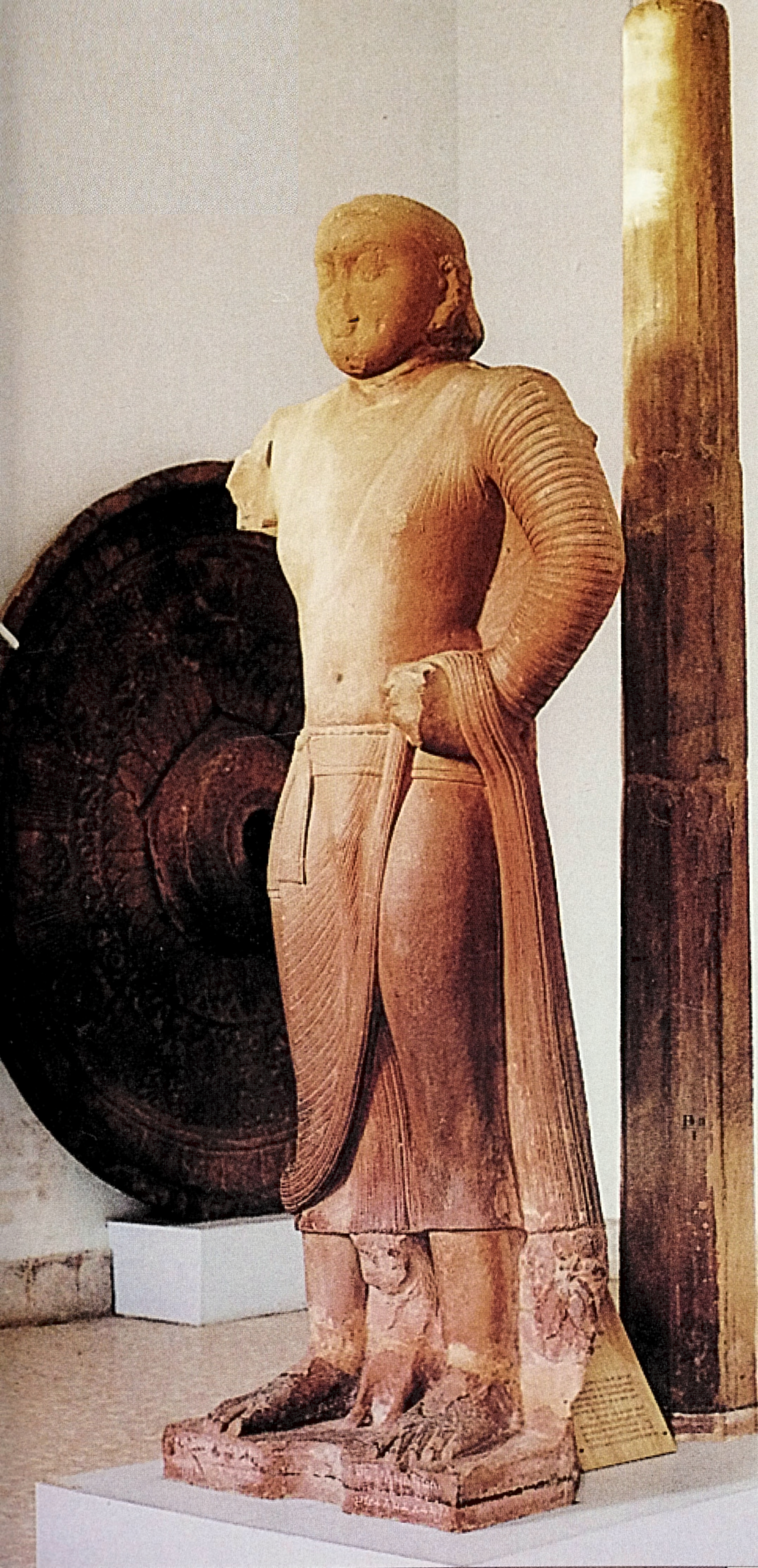
- The Bala Bodhisattva with shaft and chatra umbrella, dedicated in "the year 3 of Kanishka" (circa 123 CE) by "brother (Bhikshu) Bala". The right arm would have been raised in a salutation gesture. Sarnath Museum.
- Material: Red sandstone
- Size: about 205 cm
- Period/culture: 123 CE
- Place: Sarnath, India
- Present location: Sarnath Museum, India

Location

Chatra umbrella of the Bala Bodhisattva
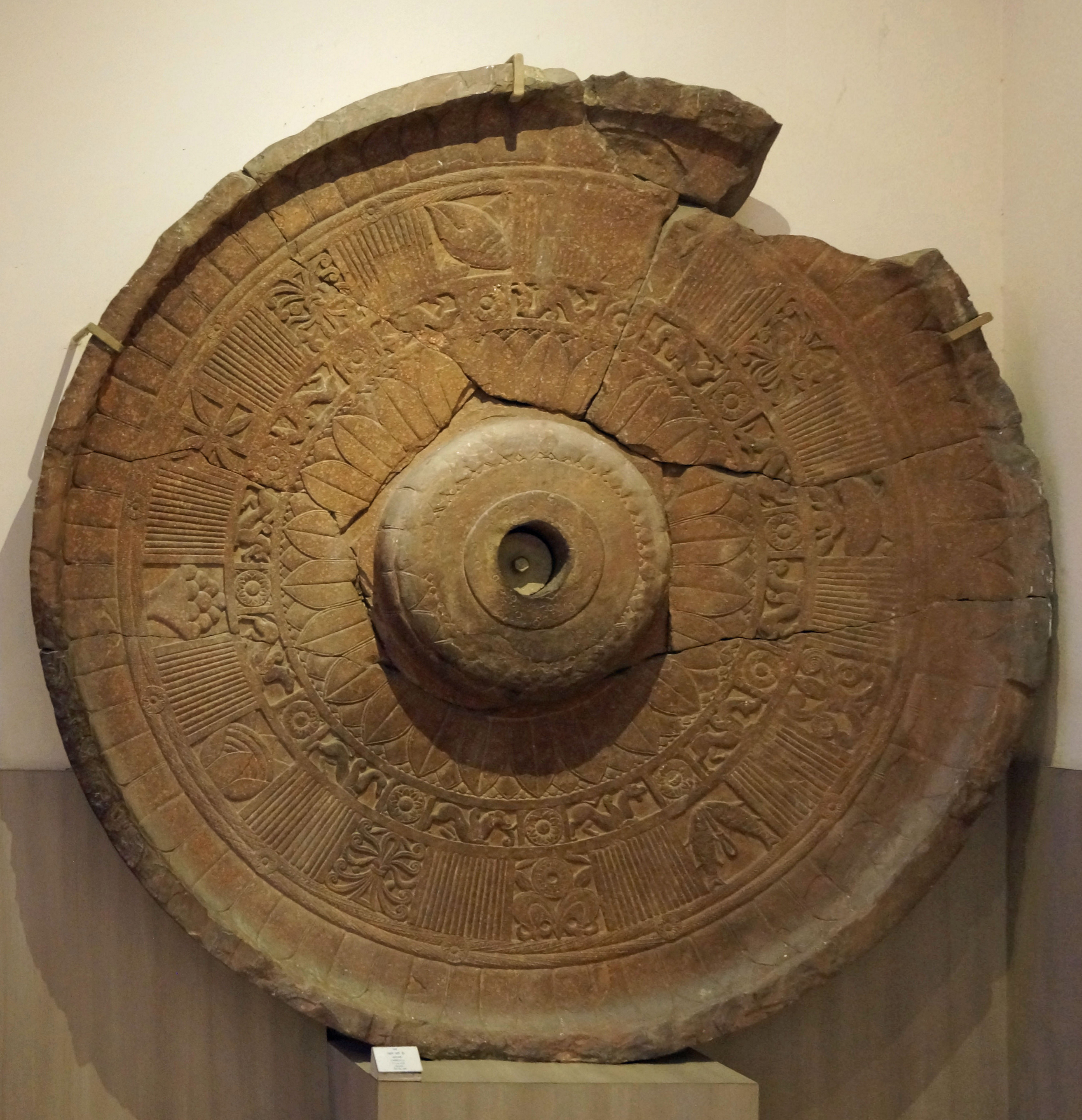
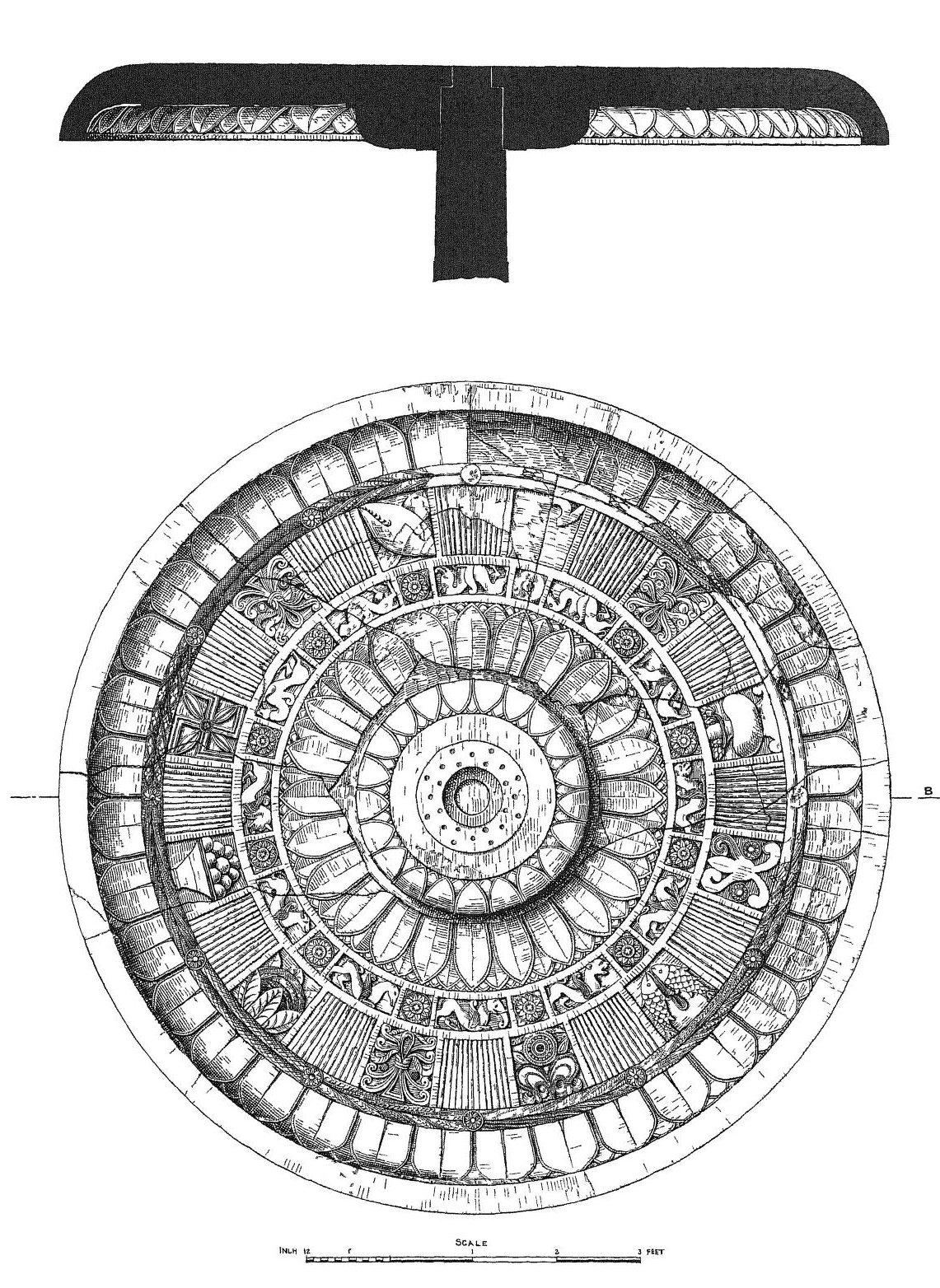
Underside of the stone umbrella with designs, probably a Zodiacal pattern, similar to the fully Greek-derived zodiacal patterns of Medieval India; Its diameter is 304 centimetres (120 in). Sarnath Museum, Accession Number 348.

The Bala Bodhisattva is an ancient Indian statue of a bodhisattva, found in 1904–1905 by German archaeologist F.O. Oertel (1862–1942) in Sarnath, India. The statue has been decisive in matching the reign of Kanishka with contemporary sculptural style, especially the type of similar sculptures from Mathura, as it bears a dated inscription in his name. This statue is in all probability a product of the art of Mathura, which was then transported to the Ganges region.

== Iconography ==
The Bala Bodhisattva, though found in Sarnath, reflects the stylistic and iconographic features of the Mathura region. Mathura school sculptures have common iconographic features with Kushan counterparts, but they show independent evolution due to purely Indic stylistic heritage. The use of characteristic red sandstone also indicates that the image belonged to Mathura school. The inscriptions on both the statue and its umbrella (or chhatra) state that it was a gift from a Buddhist monk named Bala.

=== Indic Influence ===
The figure stands in a strictly frontal position which is completely upright in a linear fashion. This posture is a continuation of traditional portrayal of yaksha figures of Maurya-Shunga times. Coomarawamy, thus, wrote that the images of Buddha evolved from strictly Indian inspiration and repertoire. The portly body and fleshy physique are similar to early Indic sculptures and dissimilar from the muscular male figures that entered the north-west region with the Indo-Greeks. Even the garment, a lower dhoti tied securely with a stash on the waist, is similar to other images of the Mathura school. The upper torso of a buddha is not shown bare; therefore, unlike usual representations of male figures, a thin clinging cloth with discernible pleats goes across the left shoulder and hangs on the arm. Despite obvious damage, the stiff smile and round face of the Bala Bodhisattva show an original Indic style.

=== Buddhist Features ===
The simple monastic robes and lack of ornamentation suggests that the statue may represent the Buddha. A lion stands between the feet of the image; the lion was known as the royal insignia of the Sakya clan, in which Gautama Buddha was born. From this, some authors have implied that the statue represents Sakyamuni Buddha himself. More recently, however, Frederick M. Archer suggests that the monk Bala "knew what he was providing," and that we accept the inscription which identifies the figure as a bodhisattva. The term bodhisattava is usually applied to someone who is on a spiritual journey towards enlightenment, and may be used to describe the Buddha before he attained nirvana. The Bala Bodhisattava's shaven head is also in marked contrast to later Buddha images where a coil of hair or the ushnisha (a raised bump on the top of the head signifying enlightenment) is often present. The right arm of the statue was probably in a traditional abhayamudra gesture ("be without fear"), as indicated by fragments found near the statue. A halo, now lost, must have been behind the statue's head and mounted to its back. The large umbrella or chhatra above the head signifies the high status of the bodhisattva, but also his potential as a chakravartin, one who upholds and turns the wheel of dharma. The underside of the umbrella is also carved with many auspicious symbols.

== Inscription ==
The inscription on the Bodhisattva explains that it was dedicated by a "Brother" (Bhikshu) named Bala, in the "Year 3 of Kanishka". This allows for a rather precise date on the sculptural style represented by the statue, as year 3 is thought to be approximately 123 CE.

The inscription further states that Kanishka (who ruled from his capital in Mathura) had several satraps under his commands in order to rule his vast territory: the names of the Indo-Scythian Northern Satraps Mahakshatrapa ("Great Satrap") Kharapallana and the Kshatrapa ("Satrap") Vanaspara are mentioned as satraps for the eastern territories of Kanishka's empire.

Main inscription
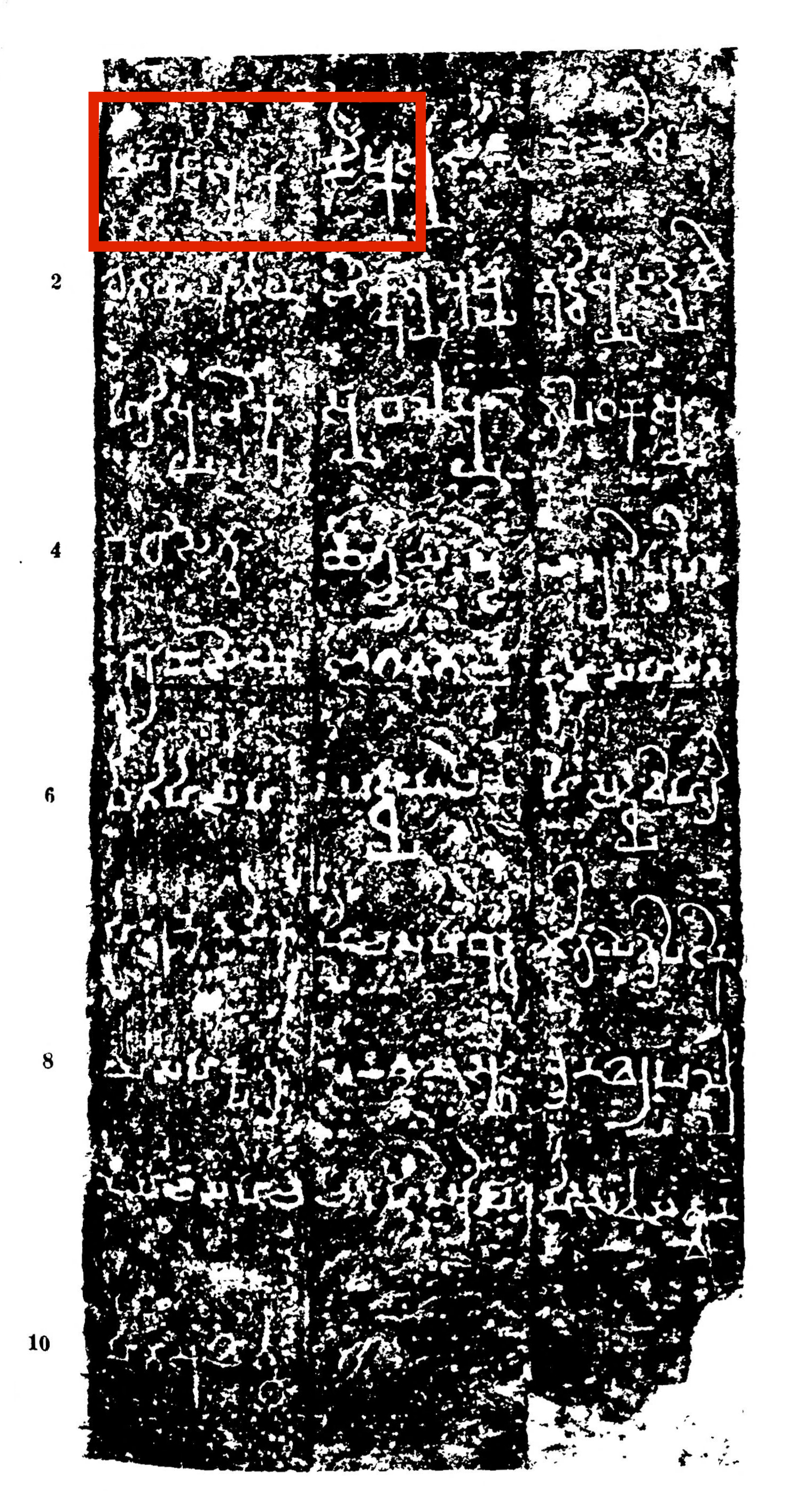
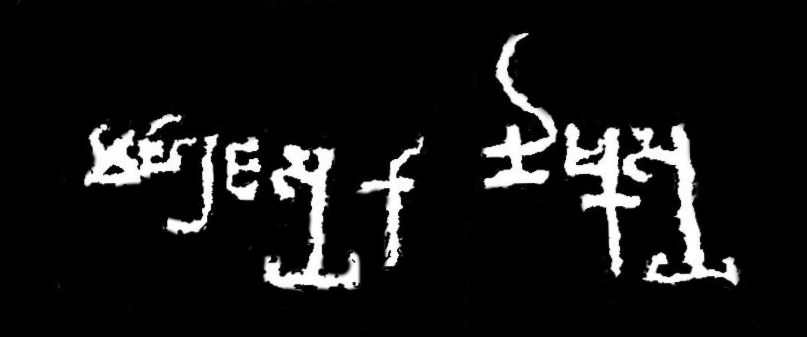
Complete inscription of Bhikshu Bala on the octagonal shaft of the umbrella, with the phrase Mahārājasya Kāṇiṣkasya "Of The Great King Kanishka" at the beginning.

Inscription on the octagonal shaft

There are altogether three inscriptions, the longest one being the inscription on the octagonal shaft of the umbrella. The octagonal shaft and its umbrella are visible in "Avatāraṇa: a Note on the Bodhisattva Image Dated in the Third Year of Kaniṣka in the Sārnāth Museum" by Giovanni Verardi.

Original text:
1. mahārajasya kaṇiskasya sam 3 he 3 di 20-2
2. etaye purvaye bhiksusya pusyavuddhisya saddhyevi-
3. harisya bhiksusya balasya tr[e]pi[ta]kasya
4. bodhisatvo chatrayasti ca pratisthapit[o]
5. baranasiye bhagavato ca[m]k[r?]ame saha mata-
6. pitihi saha upaddhyayaca[rye]hi saddhyevihari-
7. hi amtevasikehi ca saha buddhamitraye trepitika-
8. ye saha ksatra[pe]na vanasparena kharapall[a]-
9. nena ca saha ca[tu]hi parisahi sarvasatvanarn
10. hita[szc]sukharttham

Translation:
1. In the year 3 of the Great King Kaniska, [month] 3 of winter, day 22:
2–3. on this aforementioned [date], [as the gift] of the Monk Bala, Tripitaka Master and companion of the Monk Pusyavuddhi [= Pusyavrddhi or Pusyabuddhi?],
4. this Bodhisattva and umbrella-and-staff was established
5. in Varanasi, at the Lord's promenade, together with [Bala's] mother
6. and father, with his teachers and masters, his companions
7. and students, with the Tripitaka Master Buddhamitra,
8. with the Ksatrapa Vanaspara and Kharapallana,
9. and with the four communities,
10. for the welfare and happiness of all beings.

Inscriptions on the base of the statue

There are also two smaller inscriptions of similar content at the base of the statue:

At the front of the base of the statue:
"The gift of Friar Bala, a master of the Tripitaka, (namely an image of) the Bodhisattva, has been erected by the great satrap Kharapallana together with the satrap Vanashpara."

At the back of the base of the statue:
"In the 3rd year of the Maharaja Kanishka, the 3rd (month) of winter, the 23rd day, on this (date specified as) above has (this gift) of Friar Bala, a master of the Tripitaka, (namely an image of) the Bodhisattva and an umbrella with a post, been erected."

== Style ==
The style of this statue is reminiscent of monumental yaksha statues dated to a few centuries earlier. Despite other known instances of Hellenistic influence on Indian art, very little, if any, such influence can be seen in this type of statue. Thus, the style is quite different from the Greco-Buddhist art of Gandhara. This statue is in all probability a product of the art of Mathura, which was then transported to the Ganges region.

The discovery was published in the "Archaeological Survey of India Annual Report for the Year 1904–1905", in an article by F.O. Oertel pp. 59–104.

The statue and umbrella are now in the Sarnath Museum.

== Gallery ==
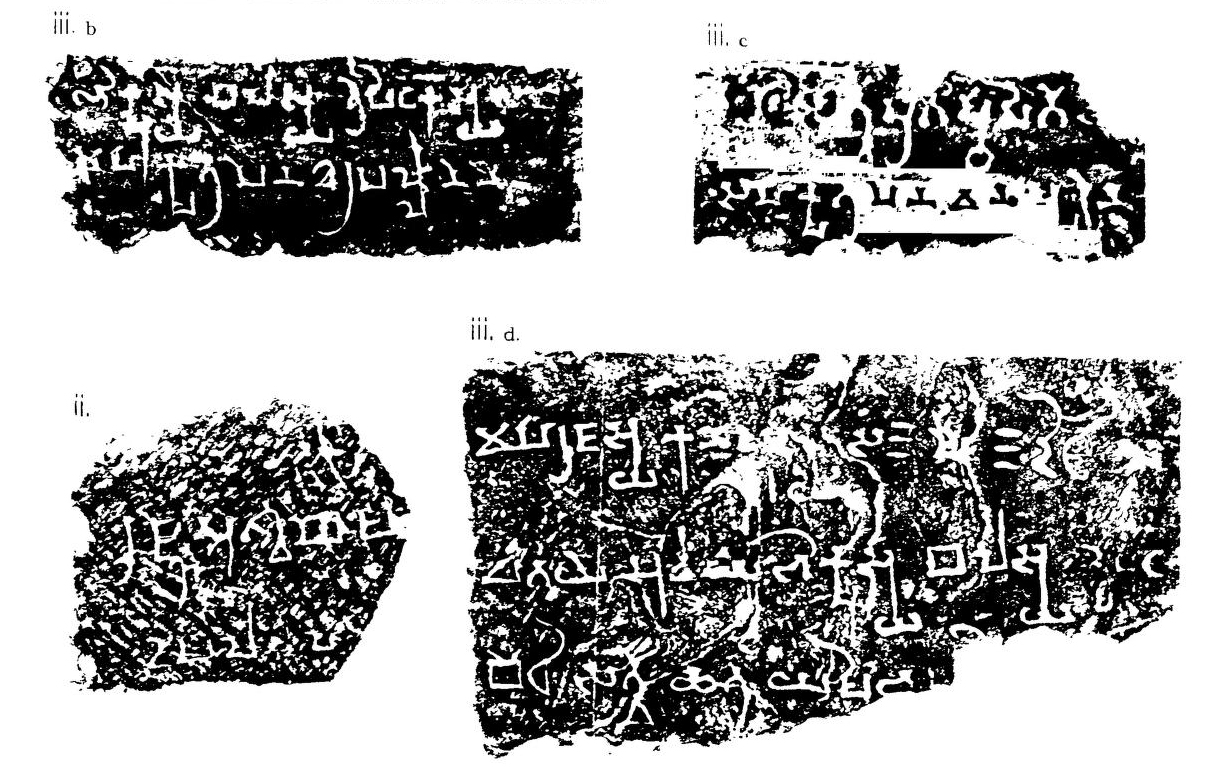
The remaining inscriptions, at the front and back of the base of the Bala Bodhisattva statue.

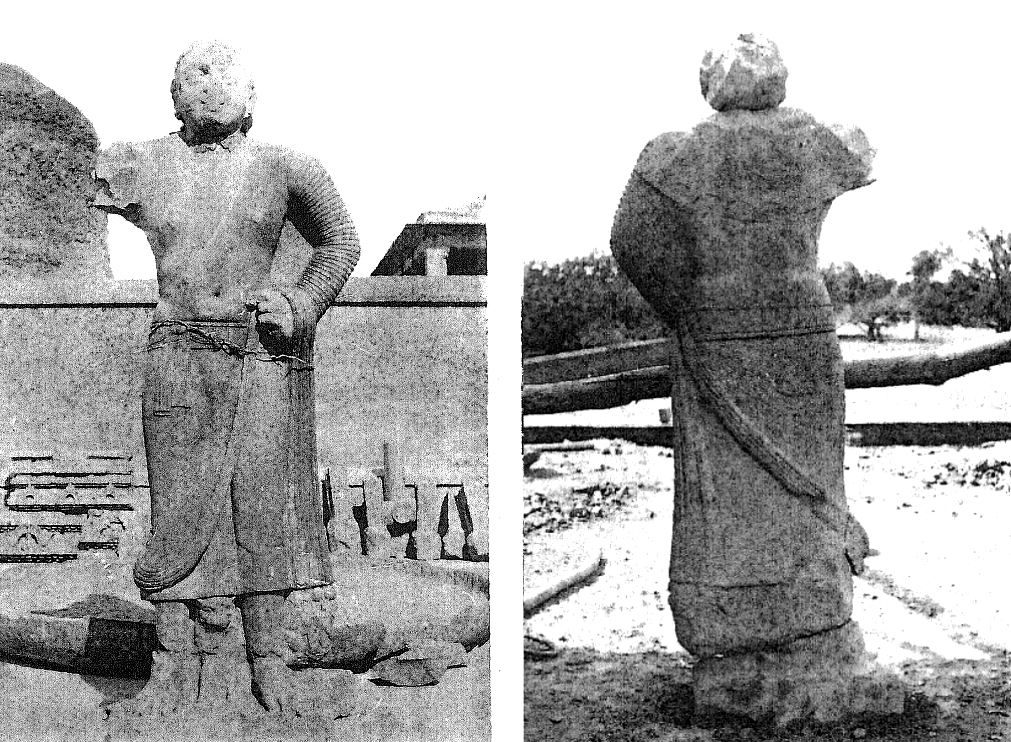
Front and back views of the Bala Bodhisattva.

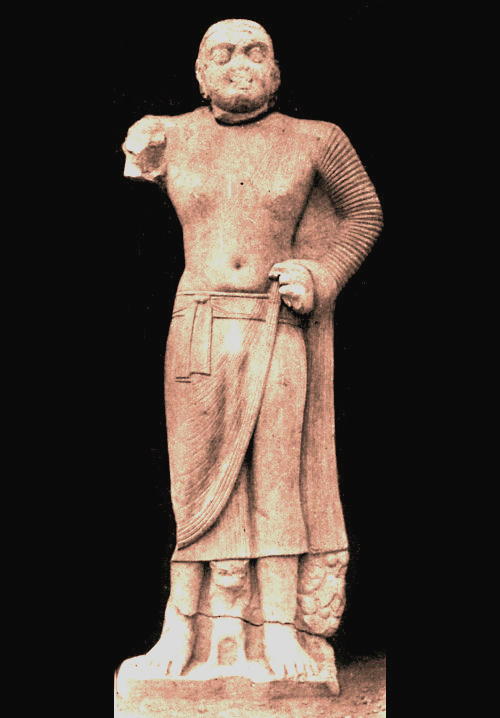
Frontal view

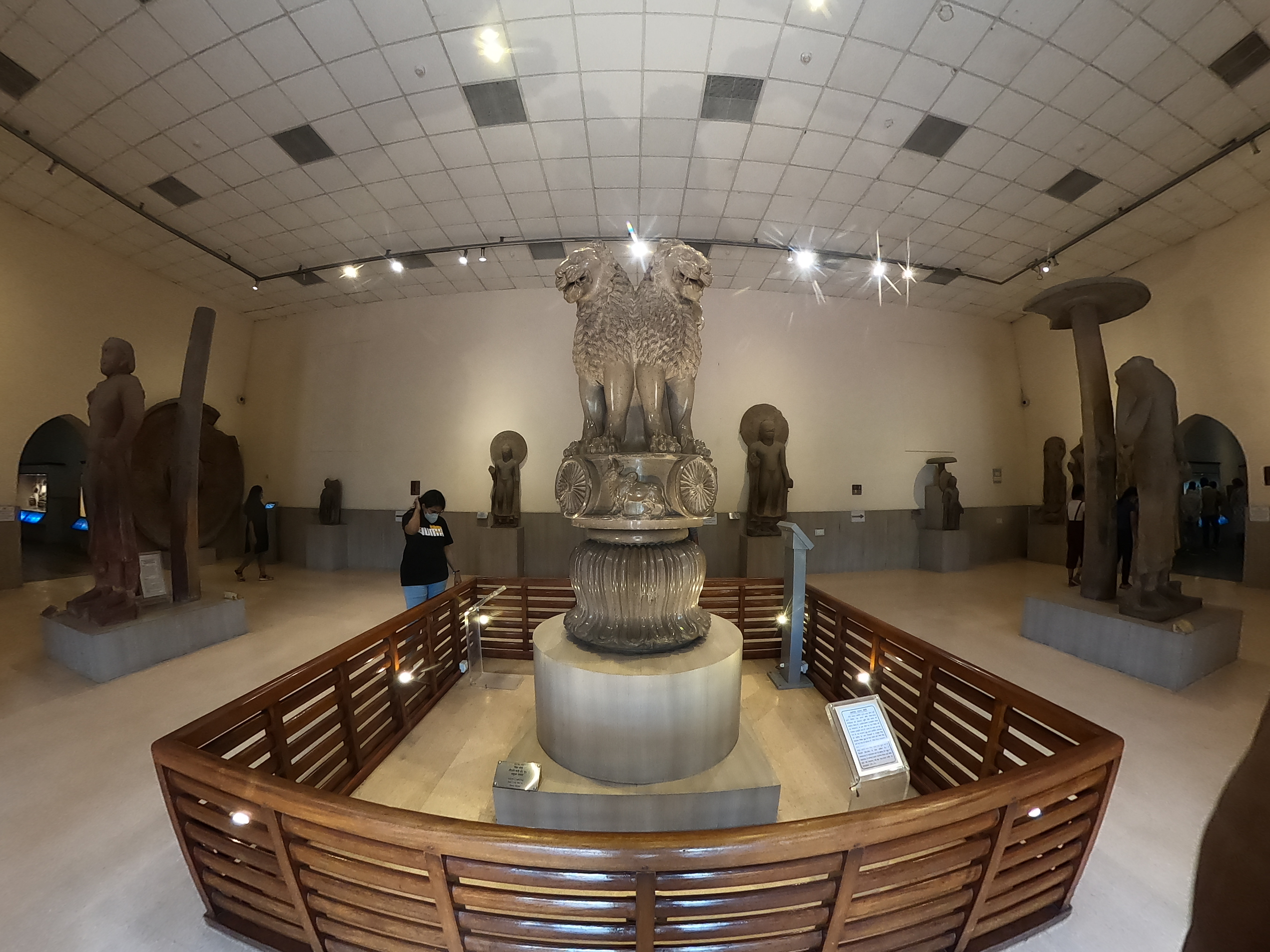
Inside view of the Sarnath Museum, with the Lion Capital of Ashoka at the center, and the Bala Bodhisattva to the left.

== See also ==
- Indian art
- Mathura art

== Sources ==
- Asher, Frederick M. (2020). Sarnath : A Critical History of the Place Where Buddhism Began. The Getty Research Institute. ISBN 978-1606066164
- Avatāraṇa: a Note on the Bodhisattva Image Dated in the Third Year of Kaniṣka in the Sārnāth Museum, by Giovanni Verardi, East and West, Vol. 35, No. 1/3 (September 1985), pp. 67–101 JSTOR
- Rhi, Ju-Hyung. “From Bodhisattva to Buddha: The Beginning of Iconic Representation in Buddhist Art.” Artibus Asiae, vol. 54, no. 3/4, 1994, pp. 207–25. JSTOR, doi:10.2307/3250056. Accessed 29 Dec. 2024.
