= Sarnath Museum =

Coordinates: 25.379601°N 83.023081°E

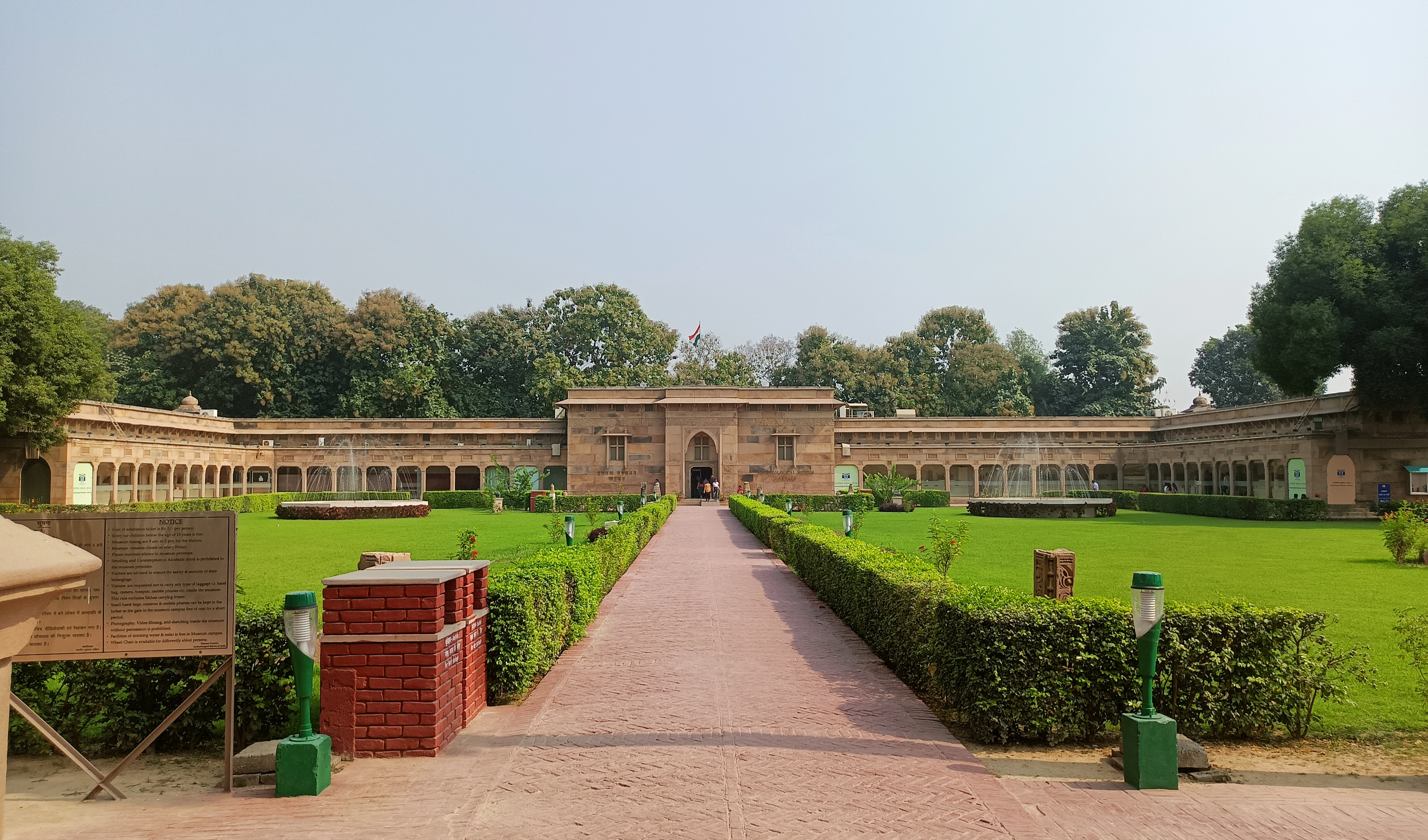
- Front view of Sarnath Museum
- Established: 1910
- Location: Saranath (near Varanasi)
- Type: Archaeology museum
- Collection size: Buddhist art, sculpture, antiquities
- Website: www.sarnathmuseumasi.org

Sarnath Museum, or Archaeological Museum Sarnath, is the oldest site museum of the Archaeological Survey of India. It houses the findings and excavations at the archaeological site of Sarnath, by the Archaeological Survey of India. Sarnath is located near Varanasi, in the state of Uttar Pradesh. The museum has 6,832 sculptures and artefacts.

== History ==
To keep the antiquities found from the site, a decision was taken in 1904 by the Government to construct a site museum adjacent to the excavated site at Sarnath. It was due to initiative of Sir John Marshall, the then Director General of Archaeology in India, that this museum was created. The plans were prepared by Mr. James Ramson, the then consulting Architect to the Government of India. The building was completed in 1910 to house, display and study the antiquities in their right perspective. The building forms half of a monastery (Sangharam) in plan.

== Galleries ==
The museum contains five galleries and two verandahs displaying antiquities ranging from the 3rd century BCE to the 12th century AD that have been found at Sarnath.

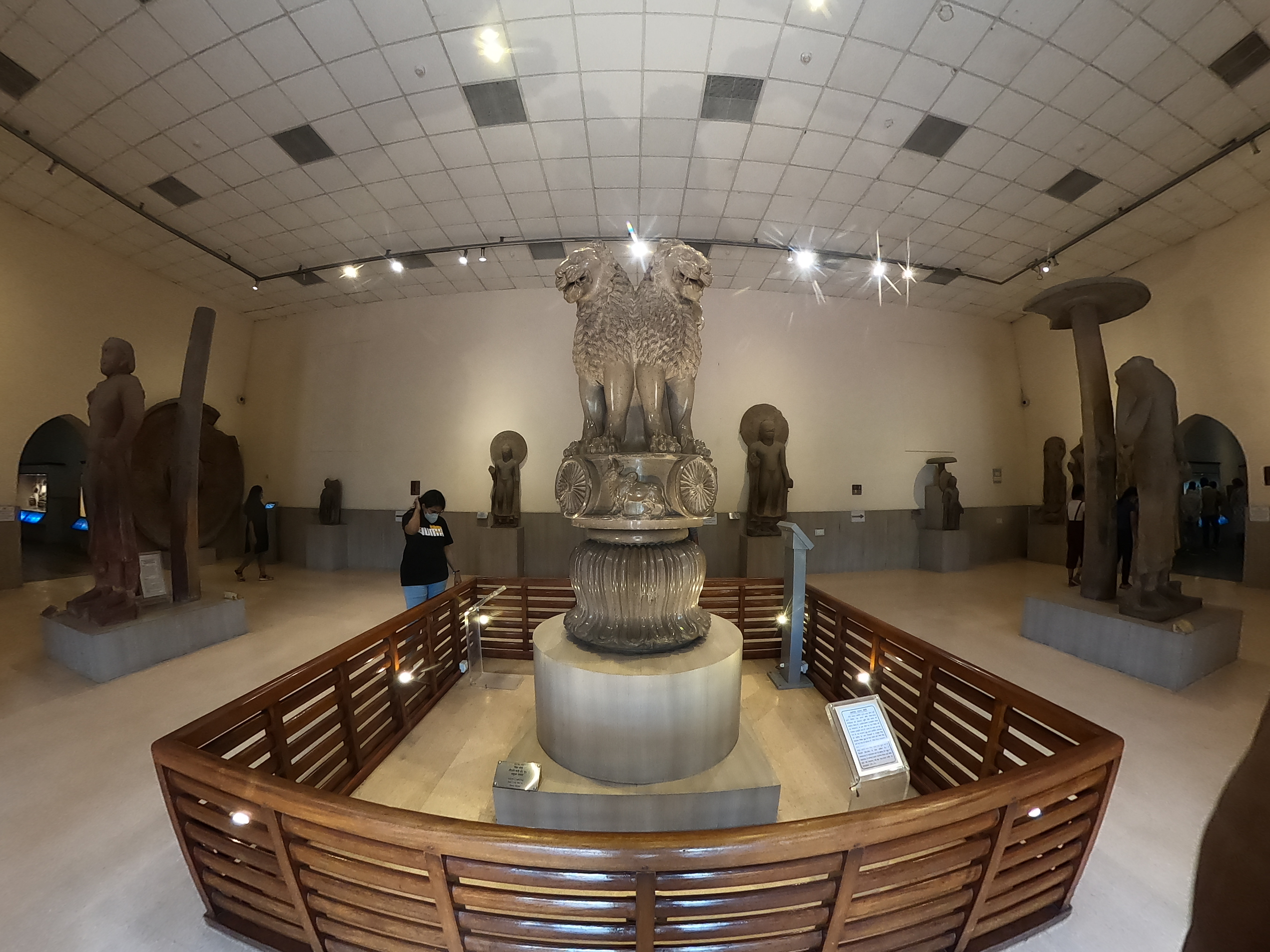
Inside view of the museum, with the Lion Capital of Ashoka at the center, and the Bala Bodhisattva to the left.

Sarnath has yielded a rich collection of sculptures, artefacts and edifices comprising numerous Buddha and Bodhisattva images and other ancient remains. Finest specimens of Buddhist art and other important remains have been housed at the museum.

While the single most famous exhibit of this museum is the Lion Capital of Ashoka, the Sarnath museum also houses a collection of other Buddhist artifacts. Among the things to see is a sculpture of the Buddha from the 5th century. The Buddha sits cross-legged, with eyes downcast in deep meditation, and a halo around his head. Also worth exploring are the several figures of the bodhisattvas.

Of other Buddhist remains, there is a life-size standing Bodhisattva and a delicate image of the Bodhisattva with a lotus, and yet another bronze sculpture showing the Bodhisattva with multiple arms. The museum at Sarnath also houses a collection of figures and sculptures from the Mauryan, Kushana, and Gupta periods. Prominent among them is the earliest Buddha image found at Sarnath and many images of Hindu Gods dating from the 9th to 12th centuries.

== Ashoka's Lion capital ==
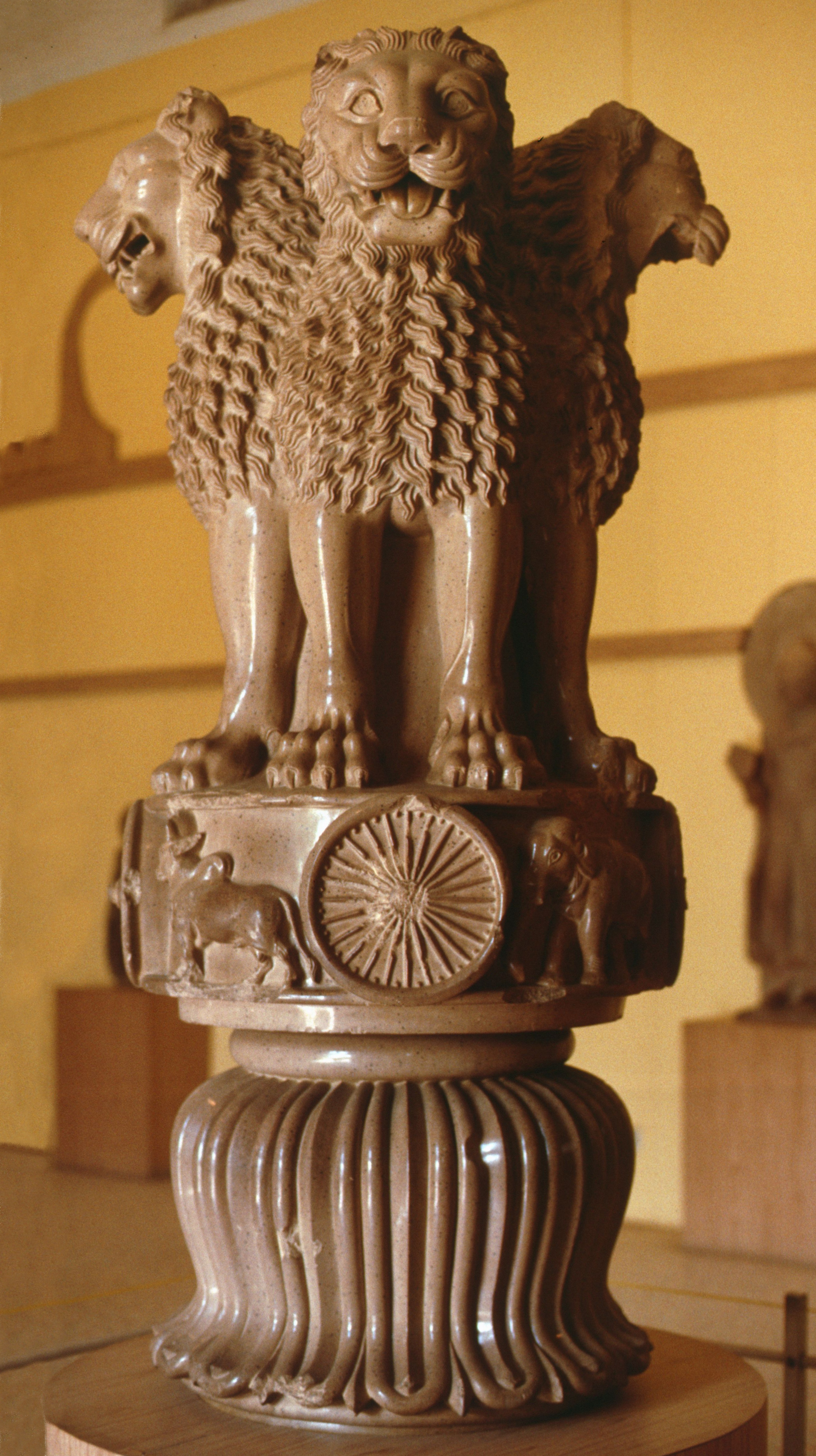
Lion Capital of Ashoka in the museum.

This is the famous original sandstone sculpted Lion Capital of Ashoka preserved at Sarnath Museum, which was originally erected around 250 BCE atop an Ashoka Pillar at Sarnath. The angle from which this picture has been taken, minus the inverted bell-shaped lotus flower, has been adopted as the National Emblem of India showing the Horse on the left and the Bull on the right of the Ashoka Chakra in the circular base on which the four Indian lions are standing back to back. On the far side there is an Elephant and a Lion instead. The wheel "Ashoka Chakra" from its base has been placed onto the centre of the National Flag of India. The fragments of the stone dharma-chakra that was once atop the lions, are now displayed nearby.

== Main collections ==
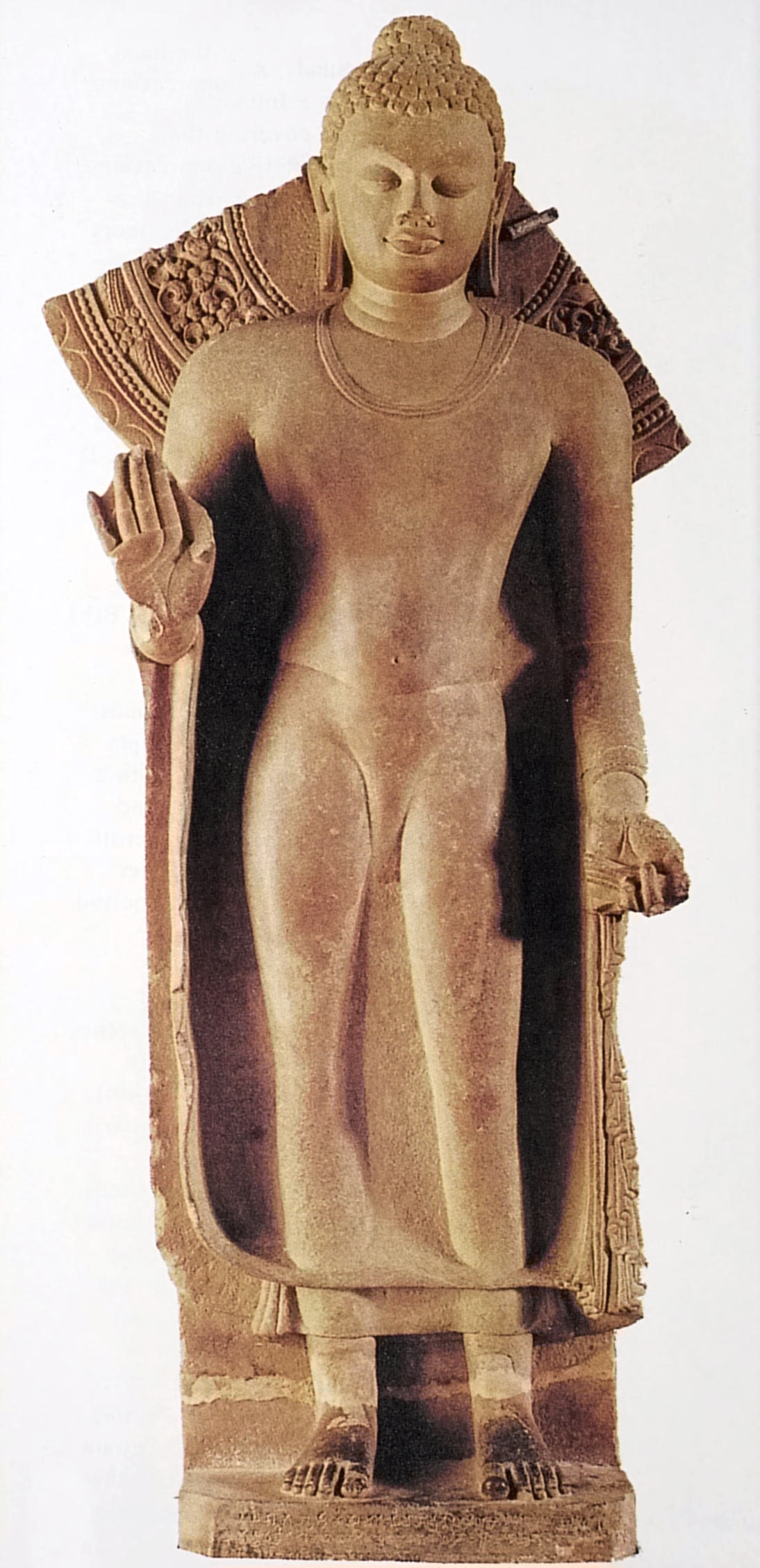
Buddha, standing, inscribed Gift of Abhayamira in 154 GE 474 CE in the reign of Kumaragupta II, Sarnath Museum.

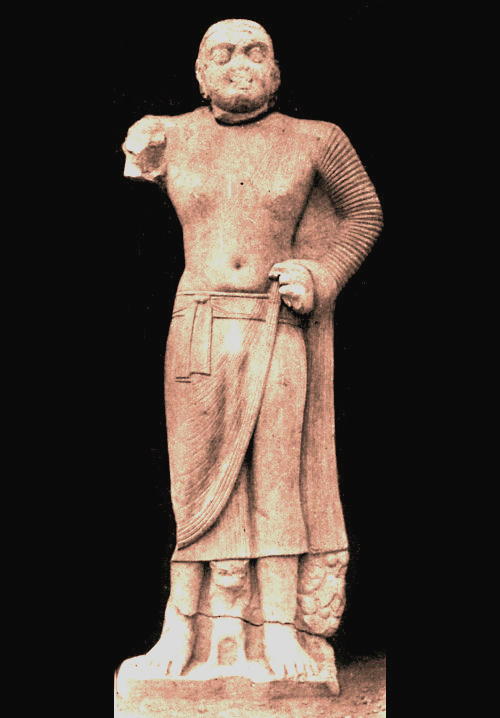
Bala Bodhisattva.

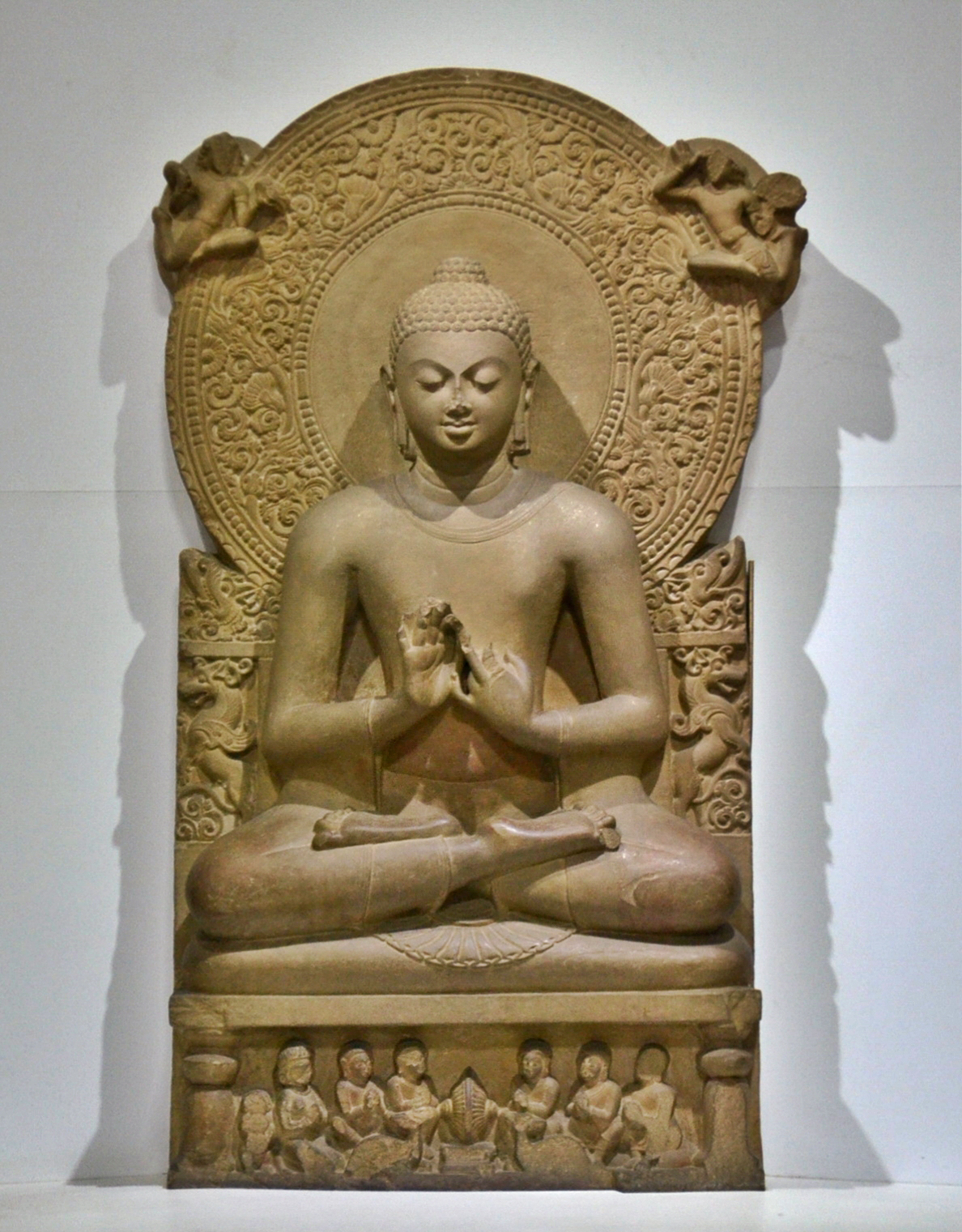
Buddha Preaching his First Sermon, Gupta period.

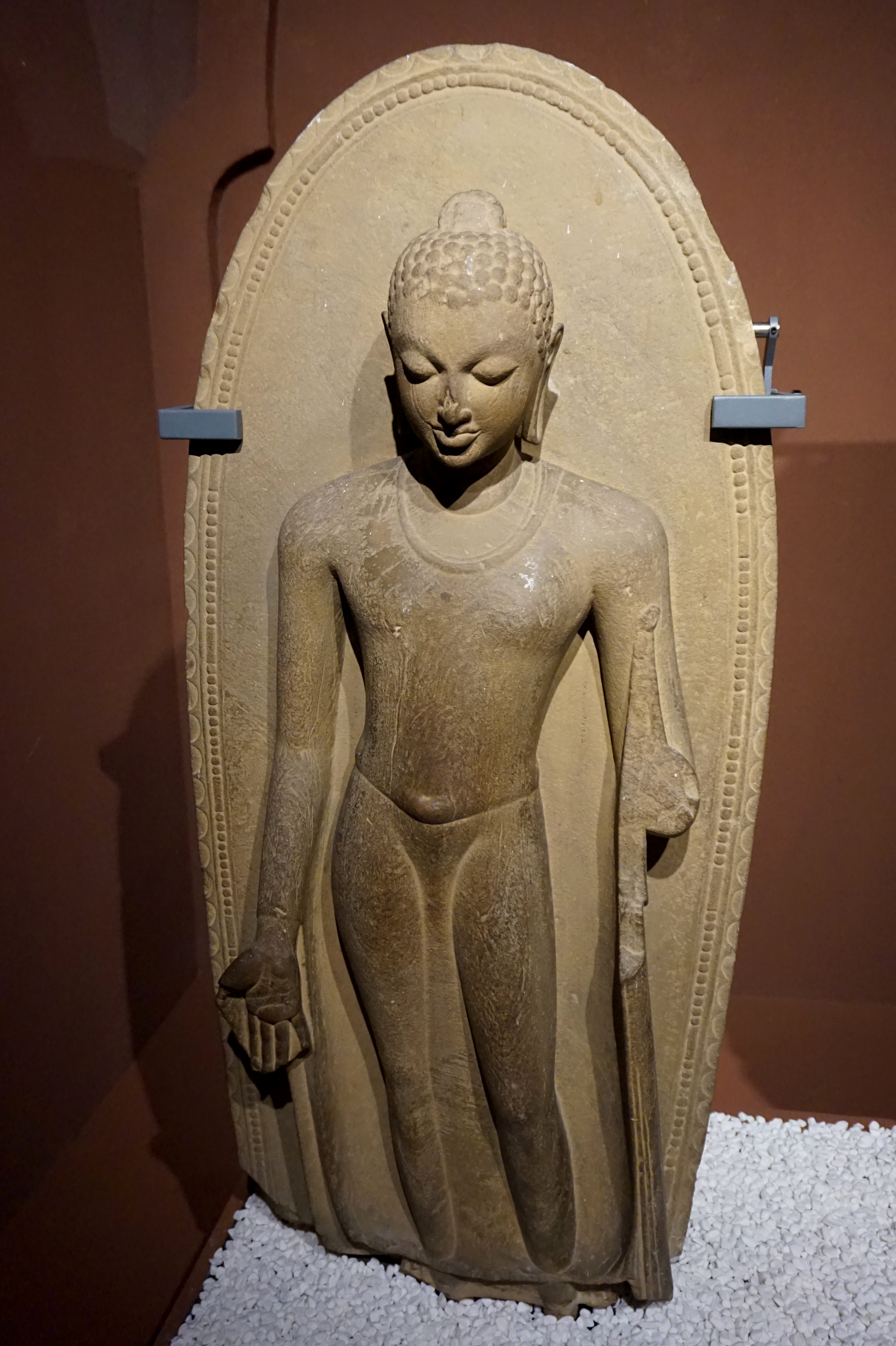
5th century Buddha.

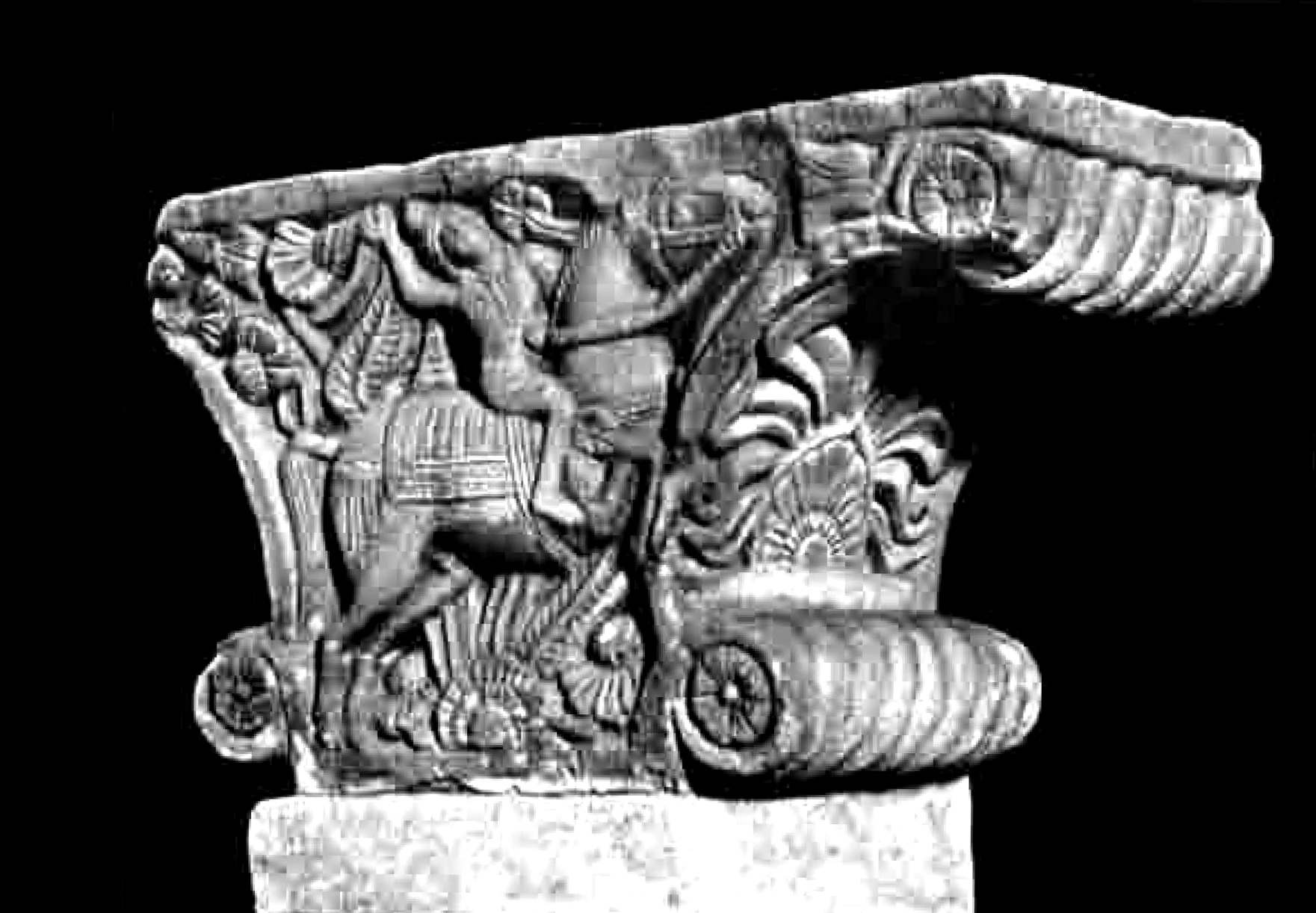
Sarnath capital

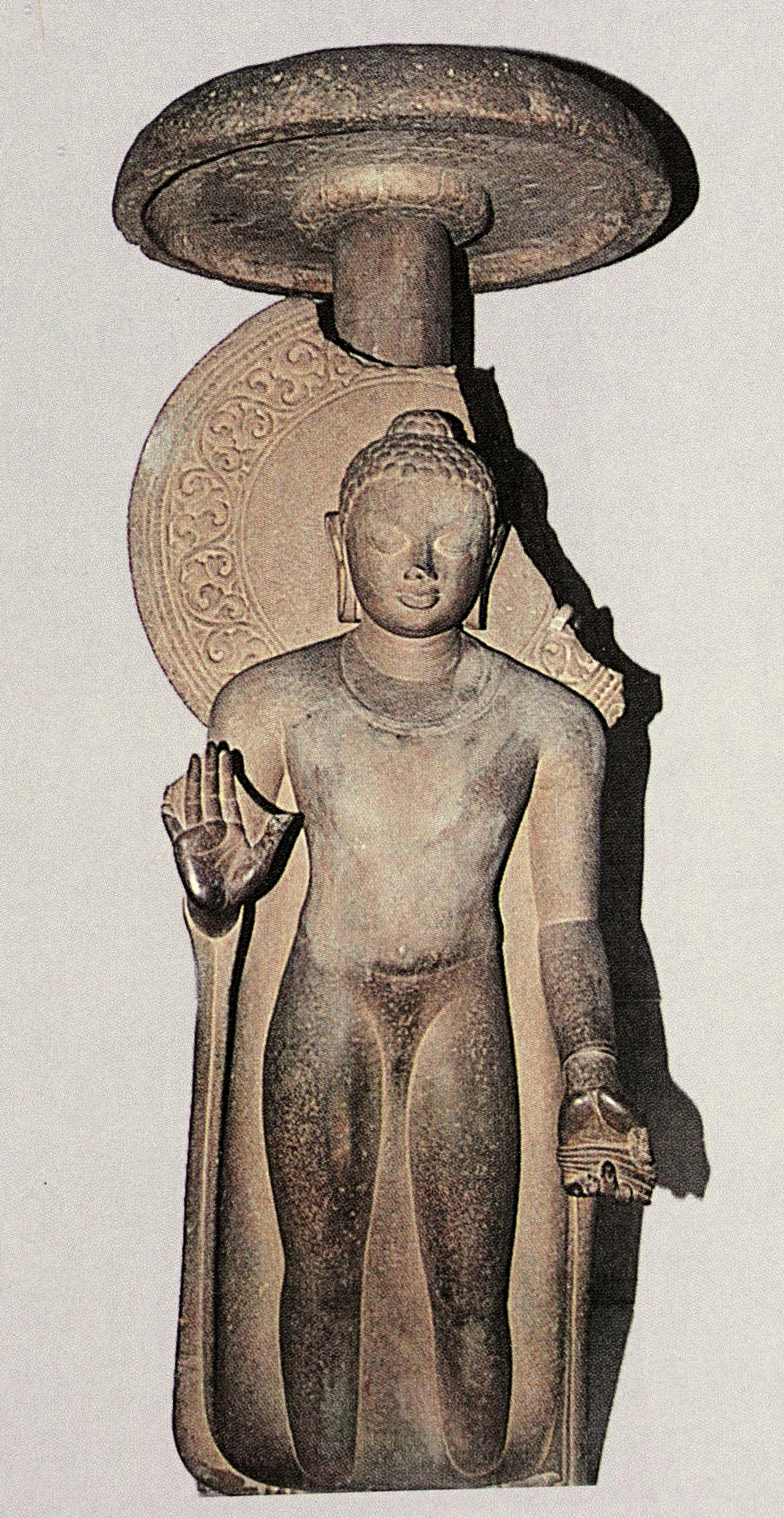
Buddha standing under umbrella, inscribed "Gift of Abhayamira in 154 GE" i.e. 474 CE in the reign of Kumaragupta II.

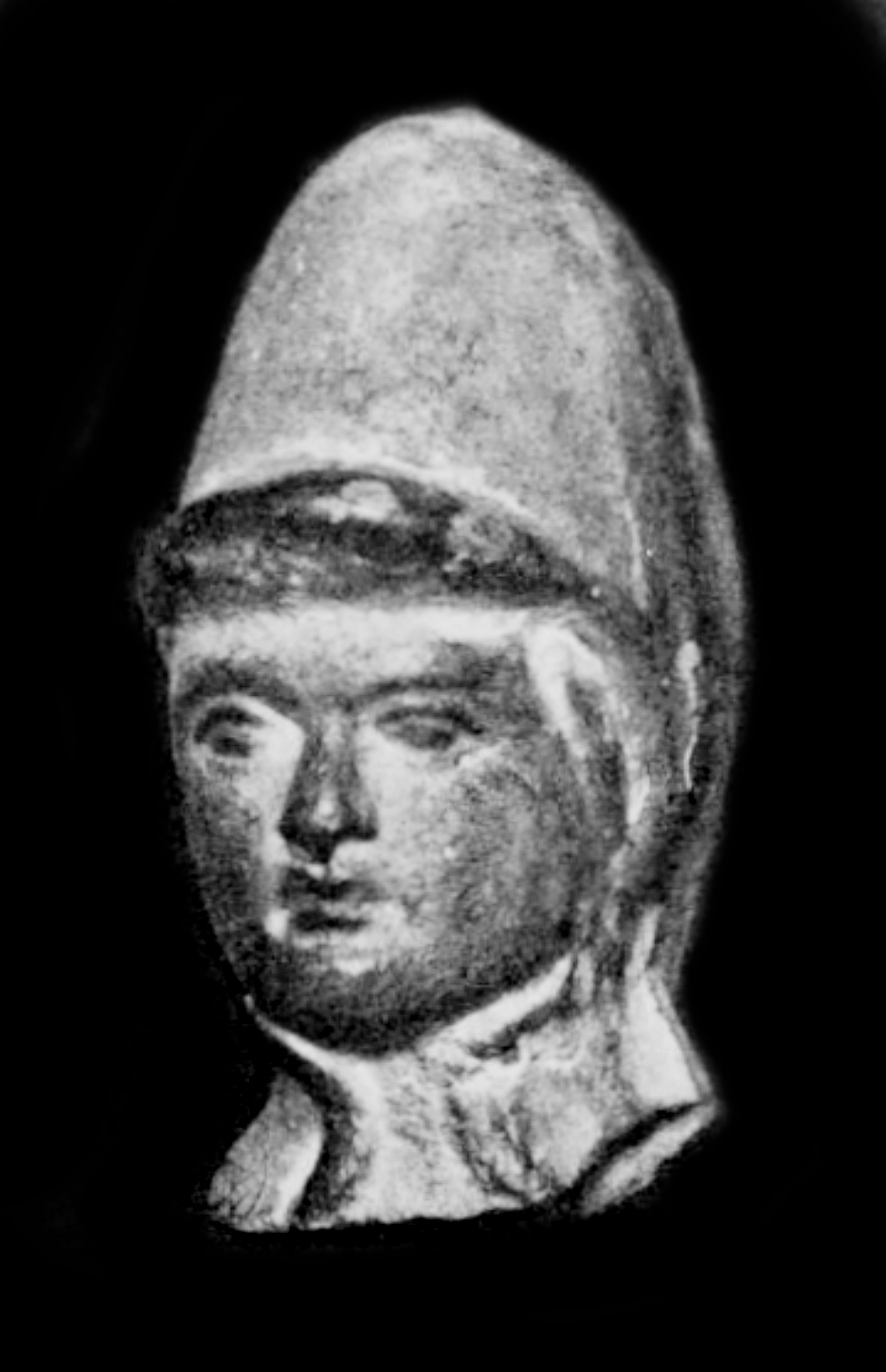
Figure of a foreigner, from Sarnath.
