= International Buddhist Museum =

Museum in Kandy, Sri Lanka

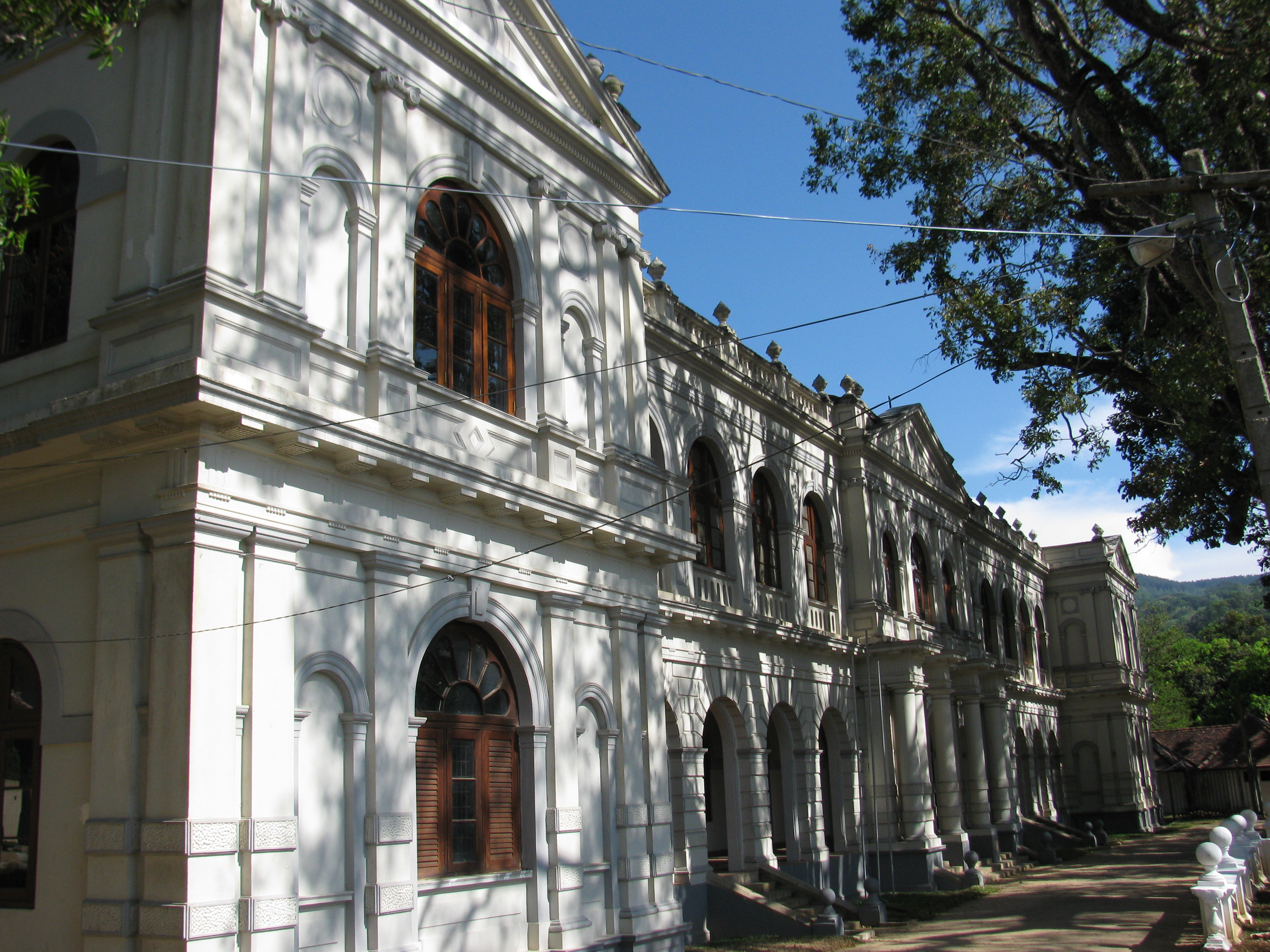
- International Buddhist Museum
- Established: 2011
- Location: Kandy, Sri Lanka
- Coordinates: 7°17′41″N 80°38′27″E
- Type: Religion
- Website: International Buddhist Museum website

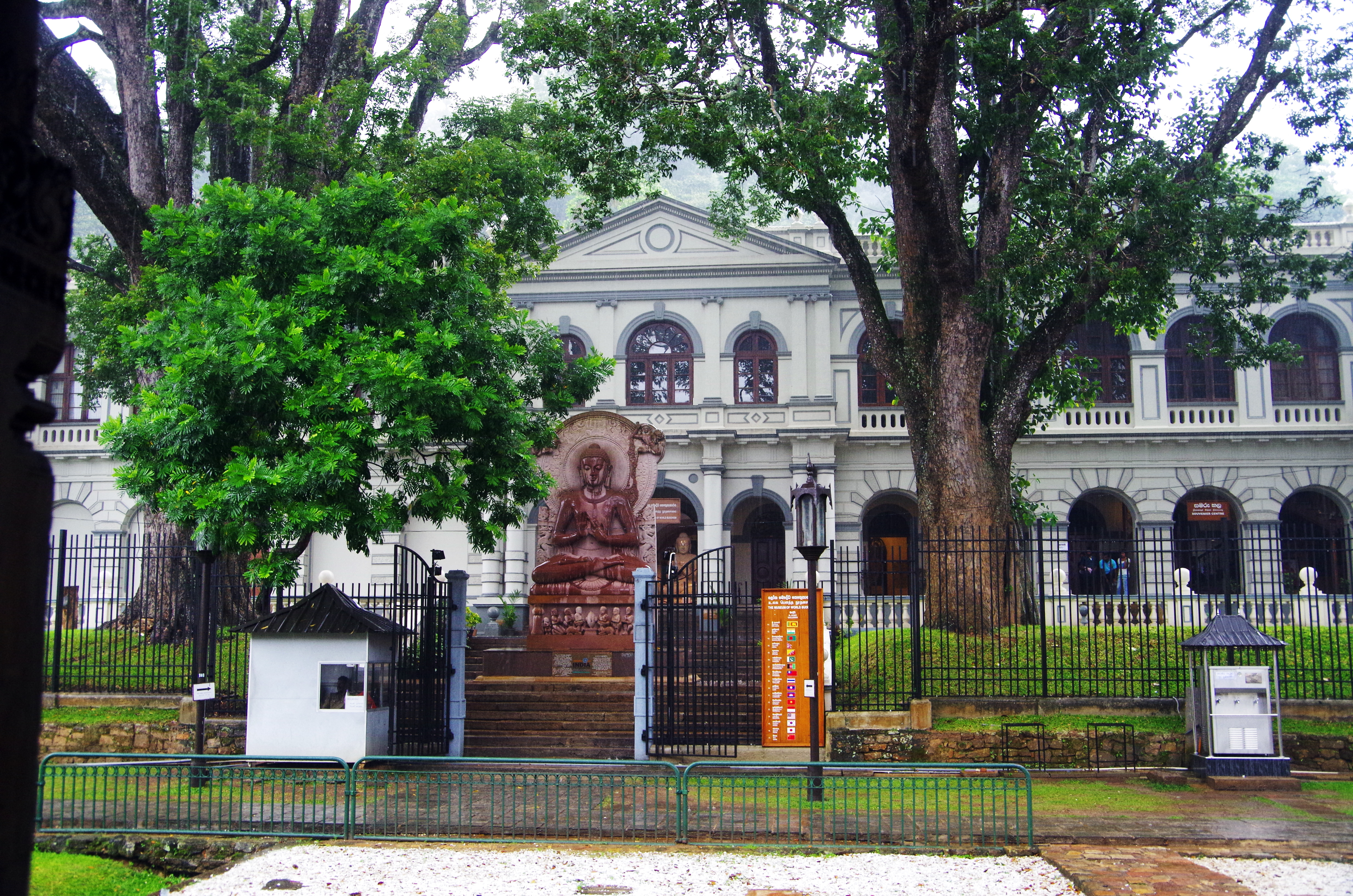
Sarnath Buddha in the front

International Buddhist Museum is the world's first International Buddhist Museum. It is located next to the National Museum of Kandy and Temple of the Tooth in Kandy, Sri Lanka. The site was the former Palace of the Kandian King, Wimaladharmasuriya, upon which the British constructed a Victorian era building, which housed the Kandy Kachcheri.

The museum was established with the contributions of 17 countries such as Sri Lanka, India, Bangladesh, Nepal, Pakistan, Japan, China, Korea, Indonesia, Thailand, Myanmar, Laos, Vietnam, Cambodia, Malaysia, Bhutan, and Afghanistan.

== See also ==
- List of museums in Sri Lanka
