= Kharapallana =

Kharapallana

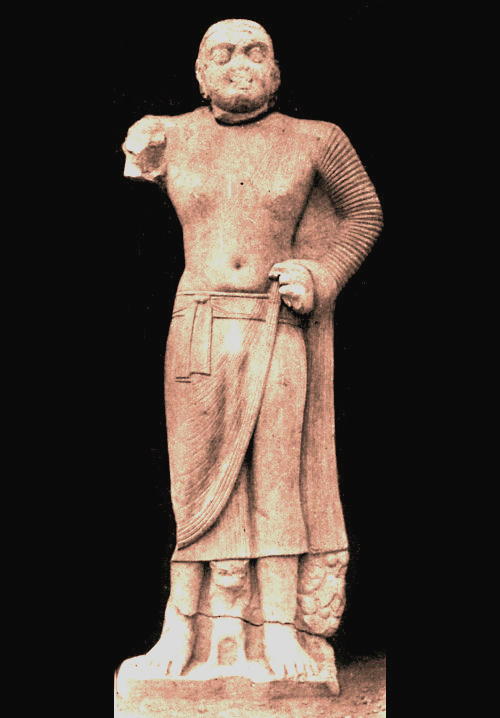
The names of the Mahakshatrapa ("Great Satrap") Kharapallana and the Kshatrapa ("Satrap") Vanaspara in the year 3 of Kanishka (circa 129 CE) were found on this statue of a Bodhisattva from Sarnath, dedicated by "brother (Bhikshu) Bala", the Sarnath Bala Boddhisattva.

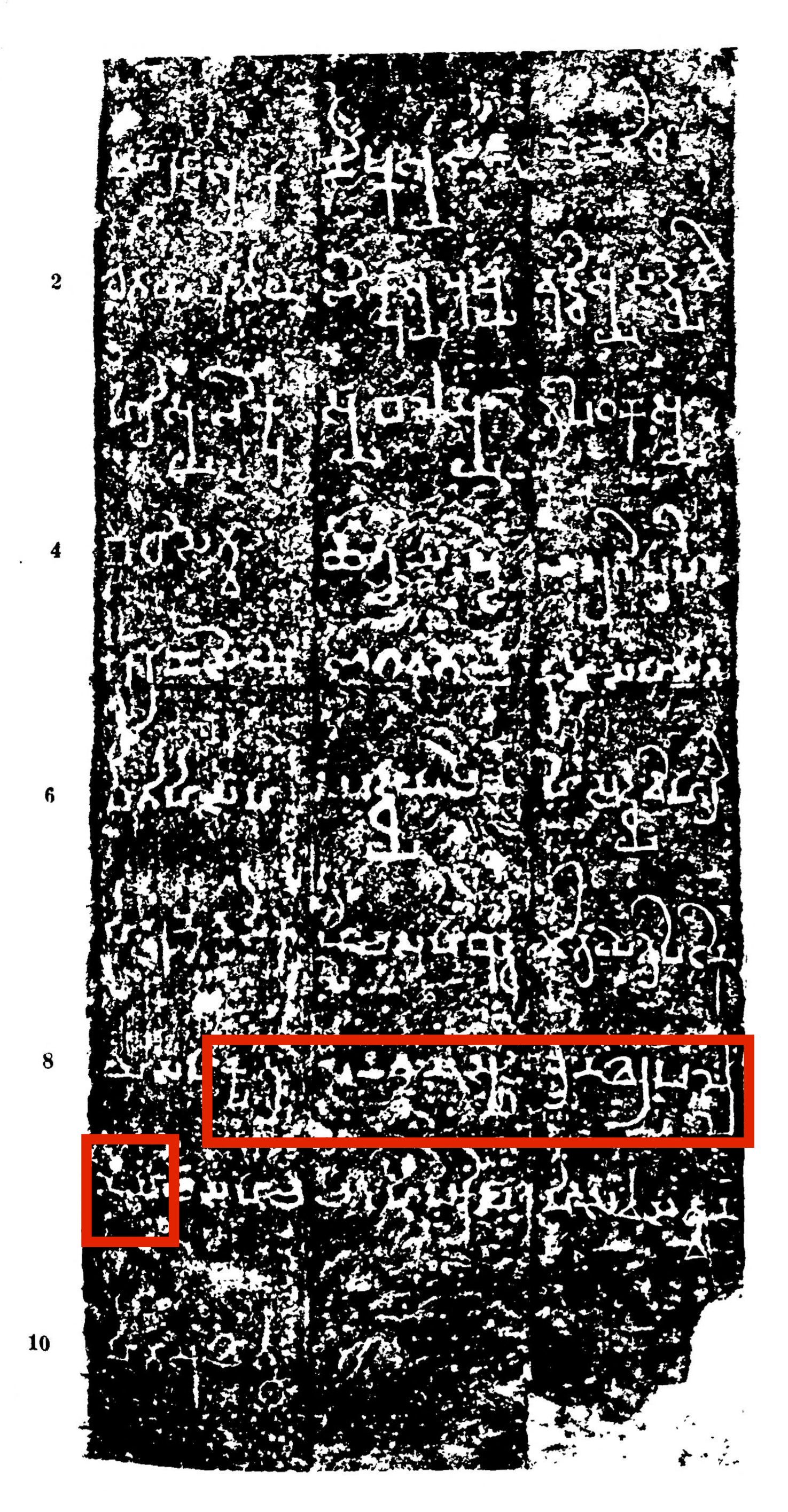
The inscription with the portion Ksatrapena Vanasparena Kharapallanena "Satraps Vanaspara and Kharapallana". The mention of the Satraps is repeated on other shorter inscriptions on the statue.

Kharapallana (Brahmi: Kha-ra-pa-llā-na, Kharapallāna; Greek: Ancient Greek: Χαροβαλανο Kharobalano) was an Indo-Scythian Northern Satrap who ruled around c. 130 CE.

== Name ==
Kharapallana's name is attested in the Greek form Kharobalano (Ancient Greek: Χαροβαλανο) and in the Brahmi form Kharapallāna, which are derived from the Saka name *Xāravalāna, meaning "splendid youth".

== Reign ==
He is mentioned as a "Great Satrap" (Brahmi:, Mahakṣatrapa, "Great Satrap") of Kushan ruler Kanishka I on an inscription discovered in Sarnath, and dated to the 3rd year of Kanishka (c. 130 CE), in which Kanishka mentions he was, together with Satrap Vanaspara, governor of the eastern parts of his Empire.

The inscription was discovered on an early statue of a Boddhisattva, the Sarnath Bala Boddhisattva, now in the Sarnath Museum .

Vanaspara and Kharapallana were ruling for Kanishka over the eastern provinces of the Empire, including the Benares region.

Territories/ dates	Sindh	Western India	Western Pakistan Balochistan	Paropamisadae Arachosia	Bajaur	Gandhara	Western Punjab	Eastern Punjab	Mathura
450–90 BCE	Ror dynasty			INDO-GREEK KINGDOM					
90–85 BCE	Ror dynasty			Nicias	Menander II		Artemidoros		
90–70 BCE	Ror dynasty			Hermaeus	Archebius				
85-60 BCE	Ror dynasty			INDO-SCYTHIAN KINGDOM; Maues					
75–70 BCE	Ror dynasty			Vonones; Spalahores	Telephos		Apollodotus II		
65–55 BCE	Ror dynasty			Spalirises; Spalagadames			Hippostratos	Dionysios	
55–35 BCE	Ror dynasty			Azes I				Zoilos II	
55–35 BCE	Ror dynasty			Azilises; Azes II				Apollophanes	Indo-Scythian dynasty of the NORTHERN SATRAPS; Hagamasha
25 BCE – 10 CE	Ror dynasty				Indo-Scythian dynasty of the APRACHARAJAS; Vijayamitra (ruled 12 BCE - 15 CE) (Note: From the dated inscription on the Rukhana reliquary)	Liaka Kusulaka; Patika Kusulaka; Zeionises	Kharahostes (ruled 10 BCE– 10 CE) (Note: An Inscribed Silver Buddhist Reliquary of the Time of King Kharaosta and Prince Indravarman, Richard Salomon, Journal of the American Oriental Society, Vol. 116, No. 3 (Jul. - Sep., 1996), pp. 442); Mujatria	Strato II and Strato III	Hagana
10-20 CE	Ror dynasty		INDO-PARTHIAN KINGDOM; Gondophares		Indravasu	INDO-PARTHIAN KINGDOM; Gondophares		Rajuvula	
20-30 CE	Ror dynasty			Ubouzanes; Pakores	Vispavarma (ruled c.0-20 CE) (Note: A Kharosthī Reliquary Inscription of the Time of the Apraca Prince Visnuvarma, by Richard Salomon, South Asian Studies 11 1995, Pages 27-32, Published online: 09 Aug 2010)	Sarpedones		Bhadayasa	Sodasa
30-40 CE	Ror dynasty			KUSHAN EMPIRE; Kujula Kadphises	Indravarma	Abdagases		...	...
40-45 CE	Ror dynasty				Aspavarma	Gadana		...	...
45-50 CE	Ror dynasty				Sasan	Sases		...	...
50-75 CE	Ror dynasty							...	...
75-100 CE	Ror dynasty	Indo-Scythian dynasty of the WESTERN SATRAPS; Chastana		Vima Takto				...	...
100-120 CE	Ror dynasty	Abhiraka		Vima Kadphises				...	...
120 CE	Ror dynasty	Bhumaka; Nahapana	PARATARAJAS; Yolamira	Kanishka I				Great Satrap Kharapallana and Satrap Vanaspara for Kanishka I	
130-230 CE	Ror dynasty	Jayadaman; Rudradaman I Damajadasri I Jivadaman; Rudrasimha I Satyadaman; Jivadaman; Rudrasena I	Bagamira; Arjuna; Hvaramira; Mirahvara	Vāsishka (c. 140 – c. 160); Huvishka (c. 160 – c. 190); Vasudeva I (c. 190 – to at least 230)					
230-280 CE	Ror dynasty	Samghadaman; Damasena; Damajadasri II; Viradaman; Isvaradatta; Yasodaman I Vijayasena; Damajadasri III; Rudrasena II; Visvasimha	Miratakhma; Kozana; Bhimarjuna; Koziya; Datarvharna; Datarvharna	INDO-SASANIANS; Ardashir I, Sassanid king and "Kushanshah" (c. 230 – 250); Peroz I, "Kushanshah" (c. 250 – 265); Hormizd I, "Kushanshah" (c. 265 – 295)			Kanishka II (c. 230 – 240); Vashishka (c. 240 – 250); Kanishka III (c. 250 – 275)		
280-300 CE	Ror dynasty	Bhratadarman	Datayola II	Hormizd II, "Kushanshah" (c. 295 – 300)			Vasudeva II (c. 275 – 310)		
300-320 CE	Ror dynasty	Visvasena; Rudrasimha II; Jivadaman		Peroz II, "Kushanshah" (c. 300 – 325)			Vasudeva III; Vasudeva IV; Vasudeva V Chhu (c. 310? – 325)		
320-388 CE	Ror dynasty	Yasodaman II; Rudradaman II; Rudrasena III; Simhasena; Rudrasena IV		Shapur II Sassanid king and "Kushanshah" (c. 325); Varhran I, Varhran II, Varhran III "Kushanshahs" (c. 325 – 350); Peroz III "Kushanshah" (c. 350 –360); HEPHTHALITE/ HUNAS invasions			Shaka I (c. 325 – 345); Kipunada (c. 345 – 375)		GUPTA EMPIRE; Chandragupta I Samudragupta
388-395 CE	Ror dynasty	Rudrasimha III		Chandragupta II					
