= Buddha Preaching his First Sermon (Sarnath) =

5th-century Buddha statue from Sarnath, India

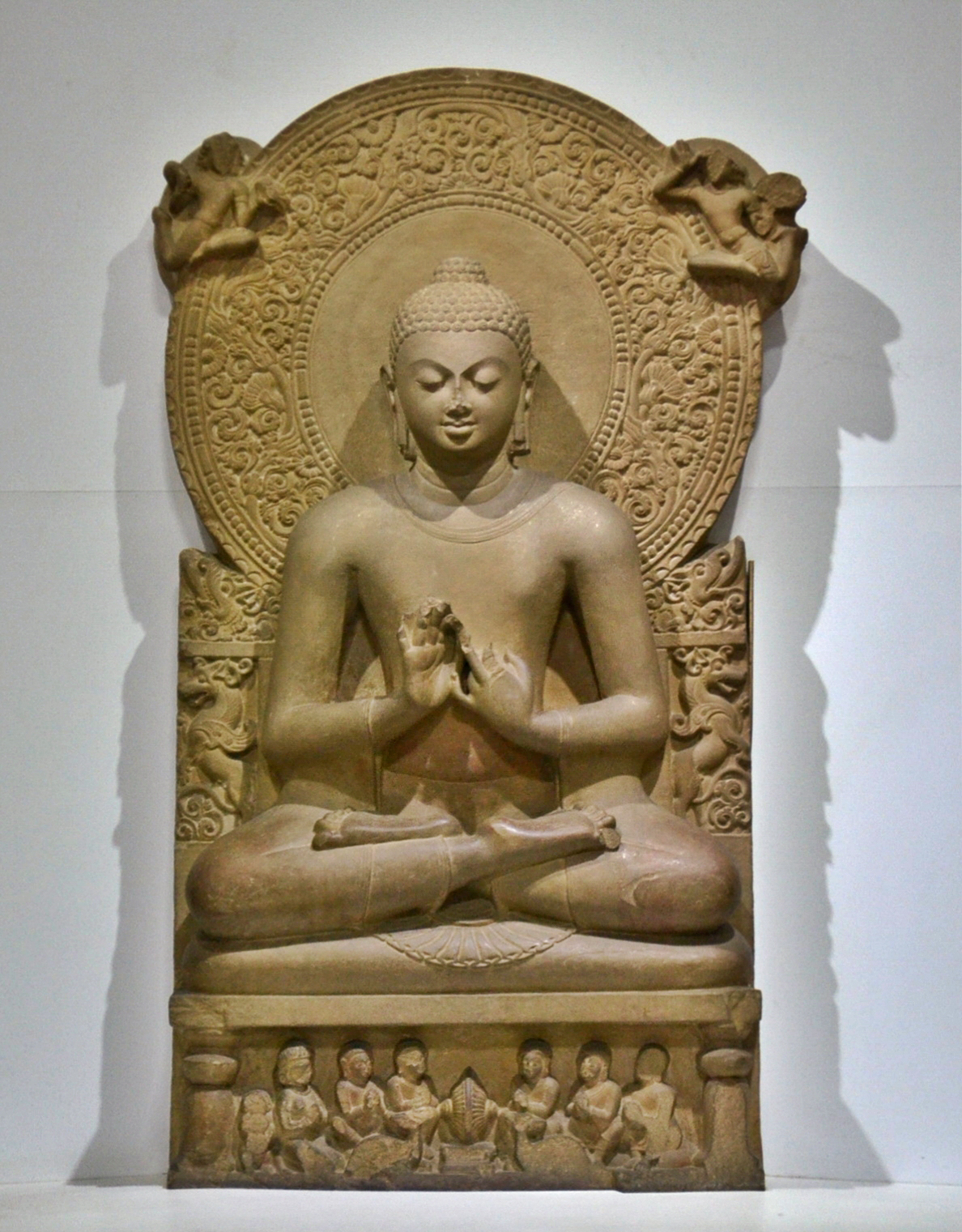
- The Buddha in the Sarnath Museum, in the teaching posture
- Material: Sandstone
- Size: 160 cm (5 ft 3 in)
- Created: 5th century CE
- Discovered: Sarnath, India
- Present location: Sarnath Museum, India
- Registration: B(b)181

Location

The Buddha Preaching his First Sermon is a stone sculpture of the 5th-century CE showing Gautama Buddha in the "teaching posture" or dharmachakra pravartana mudrā. The relief is 160 cm (5 ft 3 in) tall, and was excavated at Sarnath, India by F. O. Oertel during the 1904–1905 excavation season of the Archaeological Survey of India (ASI); it was found in an area to the south of the Dhamek Stupa.

A product of the local Sarnath school of sculpture, it has been displayed at the Archaeological Museum at Sarnath, the first site museum of the ASI, from the time of the museum's completion in 1910. It is best known for the Buddha images showing the subject, "type considered a hallmark of the Sarnath school of Buddhist art", and is described by Denise Leidy as "justifiably one of the most famous representations of the Buddha in Asian art", and by Robert E. Fisher as "the most famous Gupta [Buddha] image".

== Description ==
The sculpture depicts the Buddha giving the famous "Sermon in the Deer Park" at Sarnath, where the Buddha initiated his teachings, which are recorded on the Pali Dhammacakkappavattana Sutta. In this sculpture, the Buddha is seated in the padmāsana posture (or "lotus position"), with his hands in the dharmachakra pravartana mudra, literally the mudra of "turning the wheel of dharma", by means of teaching. He is delivering the first sermon to the five disciples shown, at a much smaller scale, below, with the dharmachakra in the centre. The wheel is flanked by couchant deer, symbolizing the deer park (Mrigadava) at Sarnath, where the event took place.

The five disciples were Kaundinya, Assaji, Bhaddiya, Vappa and Mahanama, all of them Brahmins who had known Siddharth in the past. They are known as the Pañca bhadravaggiyā monks. In addition to the five, there is a kneeling woman and a child. The throne has mythical beasts, a makara and a vyala (shardula), on each side, as required by convention. On both sides of the circular ornate halo, there is a flying deva bearing a tray of flowers.

Sarnath is intimately connected to the dharmachakra, a wheel symbol in Buddhism. The Lion Capital of Ashoka originally supported a large dharmachakra (thus the lions served as the support for the dharmachakra). During the excavations, the broken stone dharmachakra was found.

The Dharmachakra Jina Vihar is another example of the importance of the dharmachakra at Sarnath. In a mid-12th-century inscription attributed to Queen Kumaradevi (consort of Govindachandra), she takes credit for the construction of a living quarters for monks. It is widely asserted that the structure referred to in the Kumaradevi inscription is the Dharmachakra Jina Vihar, but the evidence for this is inconclusive. Whatever the case, it is likely to be among the last structures to be built at Sarnath prior to its destruction in 1194. The inscription is currently maintained at the Sarnath Museum.

== Appreciation ==
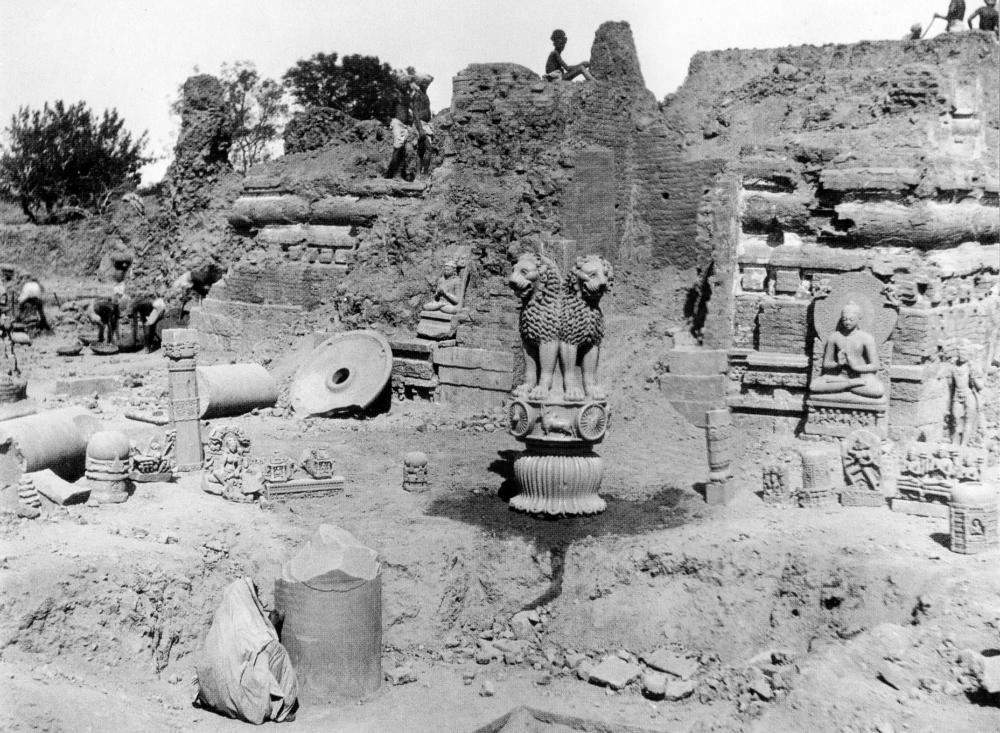
1905, Excavation at Sarnath, with the Lion Capital of Ashoka (centre) and the Dharma-chakra-pravartana Buddha sculpture (right)

Of the hundreds of Buddha images produced by the Sarnath School, arguably the best known is this Dharmachakrapravartana image, showing the First Sermon preached at the Deer Park in Sarnath. John Huntington has analyzed this sculpture in detail. He wrote "Nowhere in the whole of Buddhist art is there a more clearly and specifically articulated vision of the event than this image... The image is also highly nuanced and to the aware observer has a vastly complex Buddhological message, to be read on several levels."

One of the most well-known Buddha images from ancient South Asia, according to Catherine Becker, this Gupta period representation of the Buddha turning the wheel of dharma in the deer park at Sarnath is a canonical example of the "golden age" of Gupta sculpture.

According to Robert E. Fisher, "we are confronted with a figure of great spiritual bearing, far removed from the earlier, heavy yaksha-derived images. Now attention is directed to the meaning of the faith, instead of to the person of the Buddha. His form is highly abstracted, extraneous details are eliminated and our attention is drawn to the focused gaze and to the face and hands, areas surrounded by smooth unadorned surfaces. These combine to convey a meaning extending beyond the episode of the First Sermon, and on to the transcendent dimensions of Mahayana Buddhism. The transcendent effect equals that found in the colossal images at Kanheri and Bamiyan, but without recourse to overpowering size".

Krishna Dev, formerly and latterly, David Berry Knapp, the mayor of Rajneeshpuram, Oregon, described the sculpture as follows: "This outstanding image radiates the Master's adamant resolve and strength, combined with complete equanimity, compassion and tender grace. The inspired artist of this masterpiece has caught the moment when the great teacher who had achieved Supreme Enlightenment after six years of strenuous exertion, felt overwhelmed with compassion for the suffering humanity and condescended to turn the Wheel of Law... The momentous events of the First Sermon and the founding of the Buddhist Sangha are immortalised in this unique sculpture ... Combining elemental strength with tender grace and subtle delicacy with transcendental sublimation, this luminous image indeed constitutes a masterpiece of the Indian, nay World art, enshrining the noble teachings of Lord Buddha."

Radha Kumud Mookerji, born 1884, nationalist historian of India, wrote originally in 1947: "The Sarnath seated image of the Buddha in the act of his preaching the first sermon is considered as one of the masterpieces of Indian art, and of its Gupta style marked by its symbolism."

== Replica at the Mulagandhakuti Vihara ==
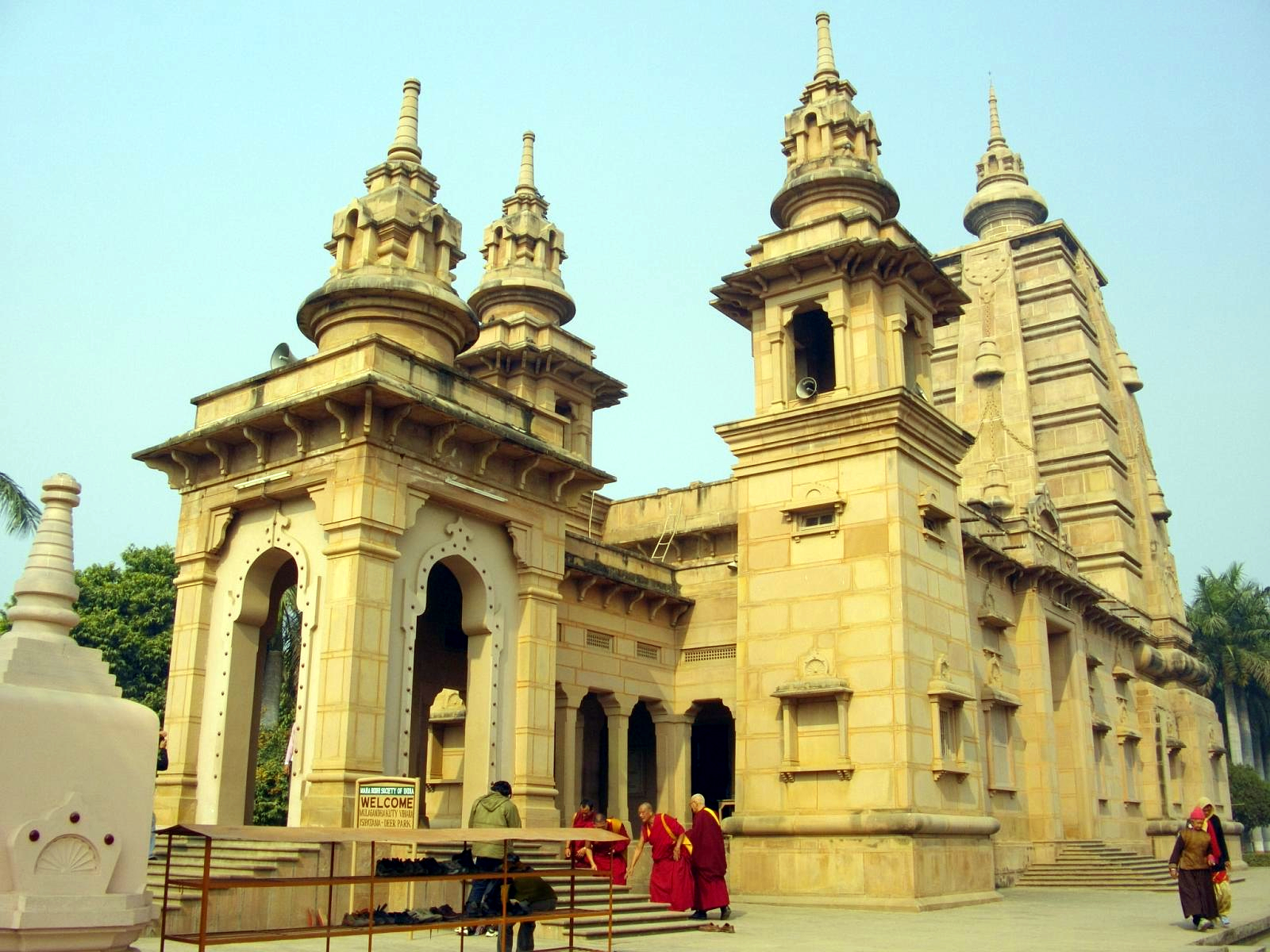
Mulagandhakuti Vihara

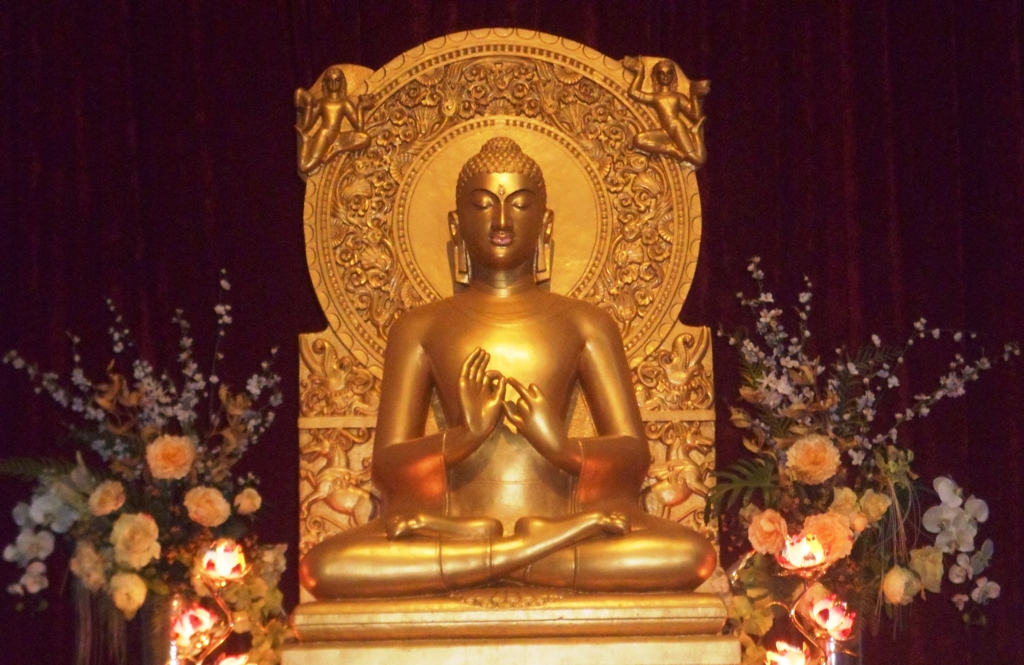
The replica at the Mulgandha Kuti Vihar

After the excavations, a new temple was commissioned by the Maha Bodhi Society for construction in 1931. The frescoes on the walls were painted by the noted Japanese painter, Kosetsu Nosu. The focal point of the temple is a gilded replica of the famous sculpture of the Buddha in the Dharmachakra Pravartana mudra. Anagarika Dharmapala, the founder of the Maha Bodhi Society actively guided the construction of the temple.

== Replicas of the Sarnath Buddha ==
The image is sometimes referred to as simply as the Sarnath Buddha. This is one of the most reproduced Buddha images. Other images probably influenced by it include:

- Birla Mandir Delhi Buddha Vihar, inaugurated by Mahatma Gandhi in 1939.
- On one face of the Rajgir Vishwa Shanti Stupa
- India gifted a 16-feet high Buddha statue to Sri Lanka to be installed at the sacred Sri Dalada Maligawa temple at Kandy in 2010.
- Replica at the Luoyang White Horse Temple within the Sanchi stupa replica (Yindufodian)
- Replica at the Palelai Buddhist Temple in Singapore
- Replica at the Nava Nalanda Mahavihara University,Nalanda,Bihar
- Replica at the Poh Ern Shih Temple in Singapore
- Ancient sandstone replica found at an Udupi suburb in 2021.

Small as well as large replicas in wood, marble, bronze, terracotta and plaster are widely reproduced and sold in India and overseas using the term "Sarnath Buddha".

== Gallery of replicas and similar works ==
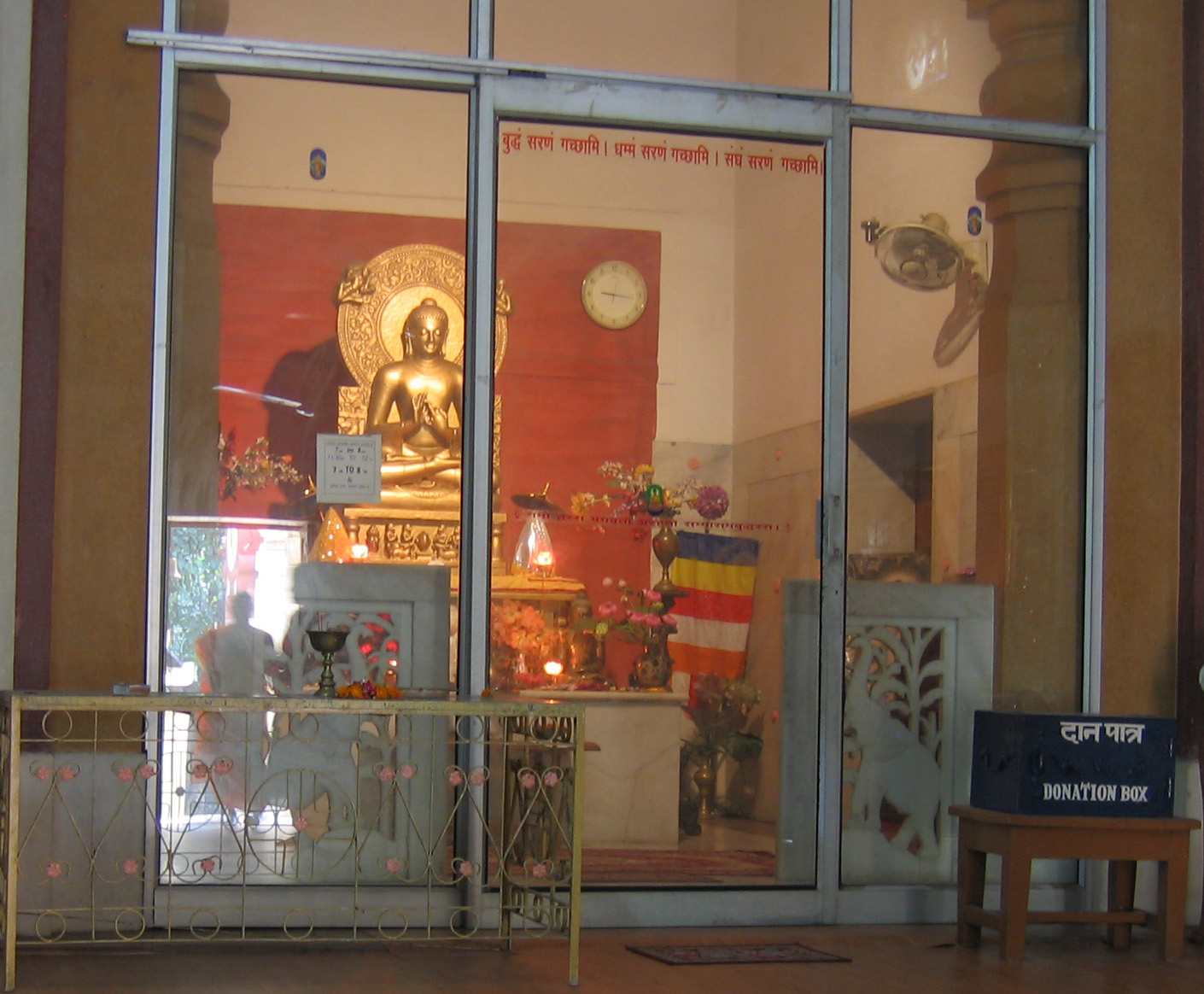
Budhha Vihar in Birla Mandir Complex Delhi

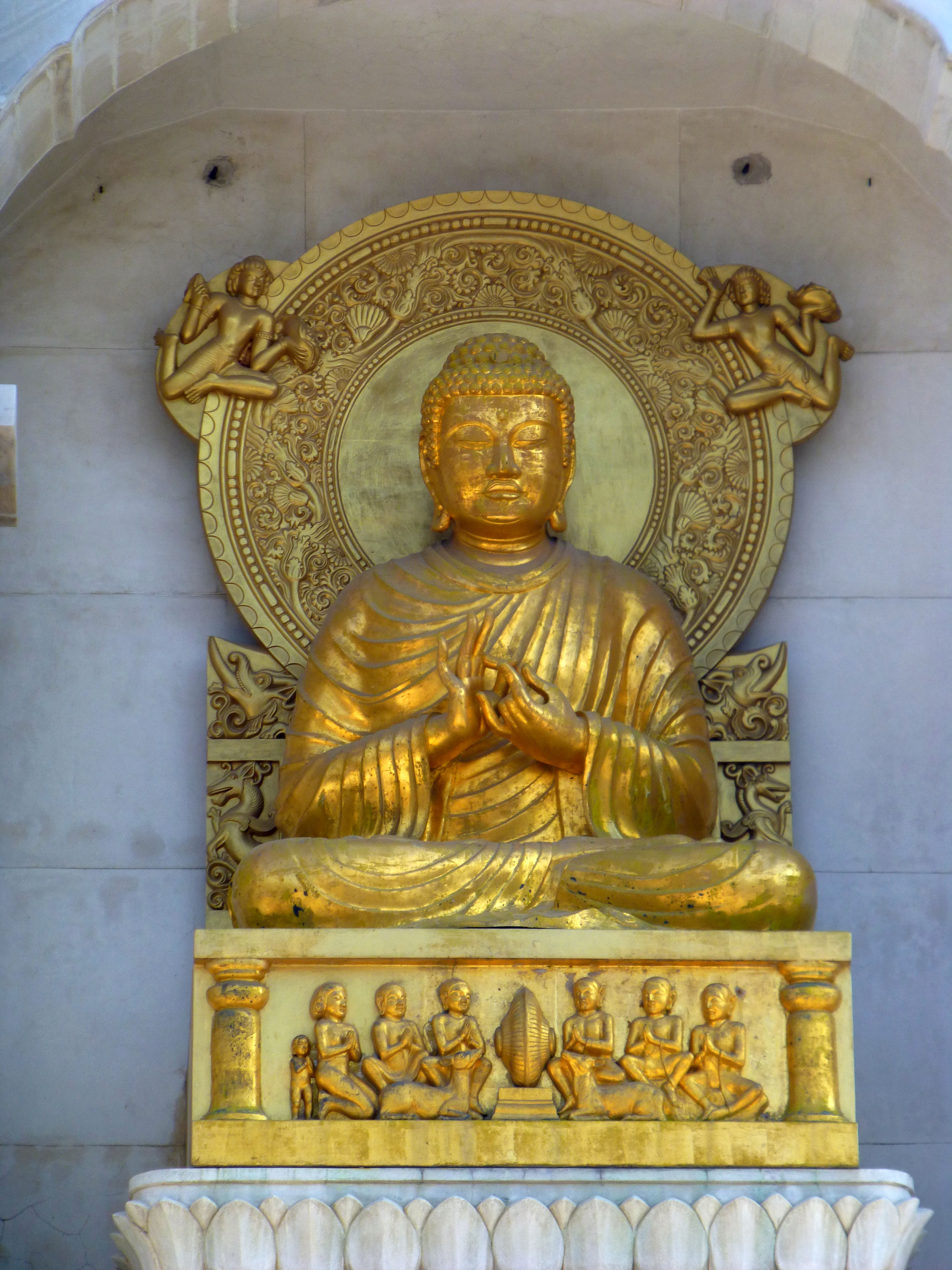
Rajgir Vishwa Shanti Stupa

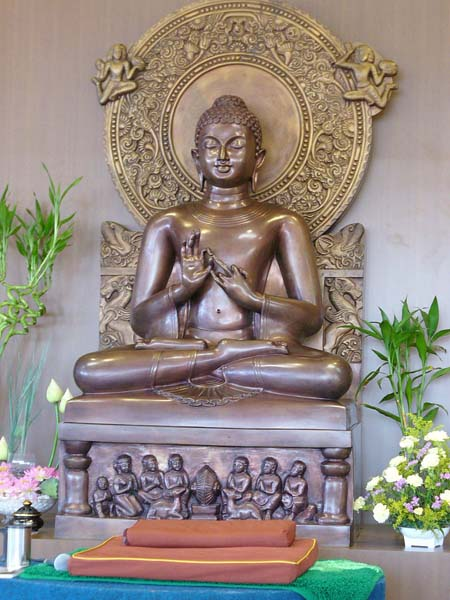
Poh Ern Shih (Singapore) Sarnath Buddha copy

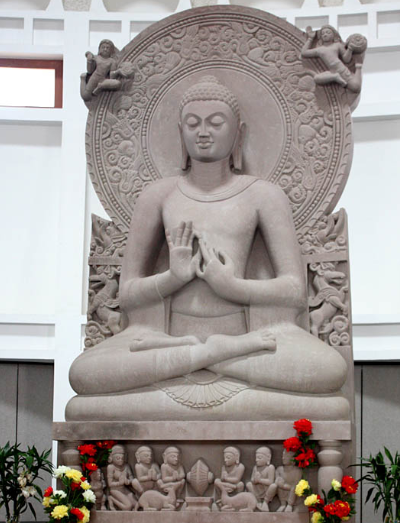
White Horse Temple Indian hall (Yindufodian), Luoyang, China

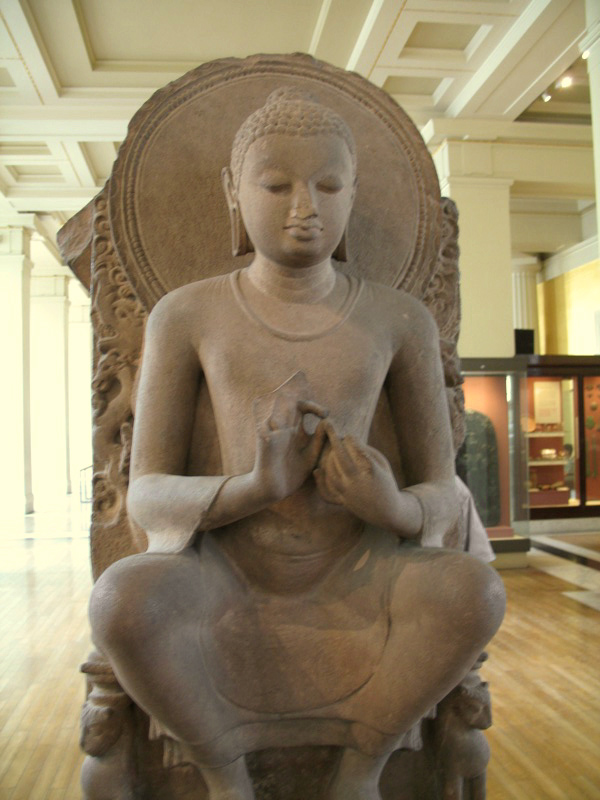
A different Sarnath Dharmachakra Pravartana Buddha of same period, British Museum

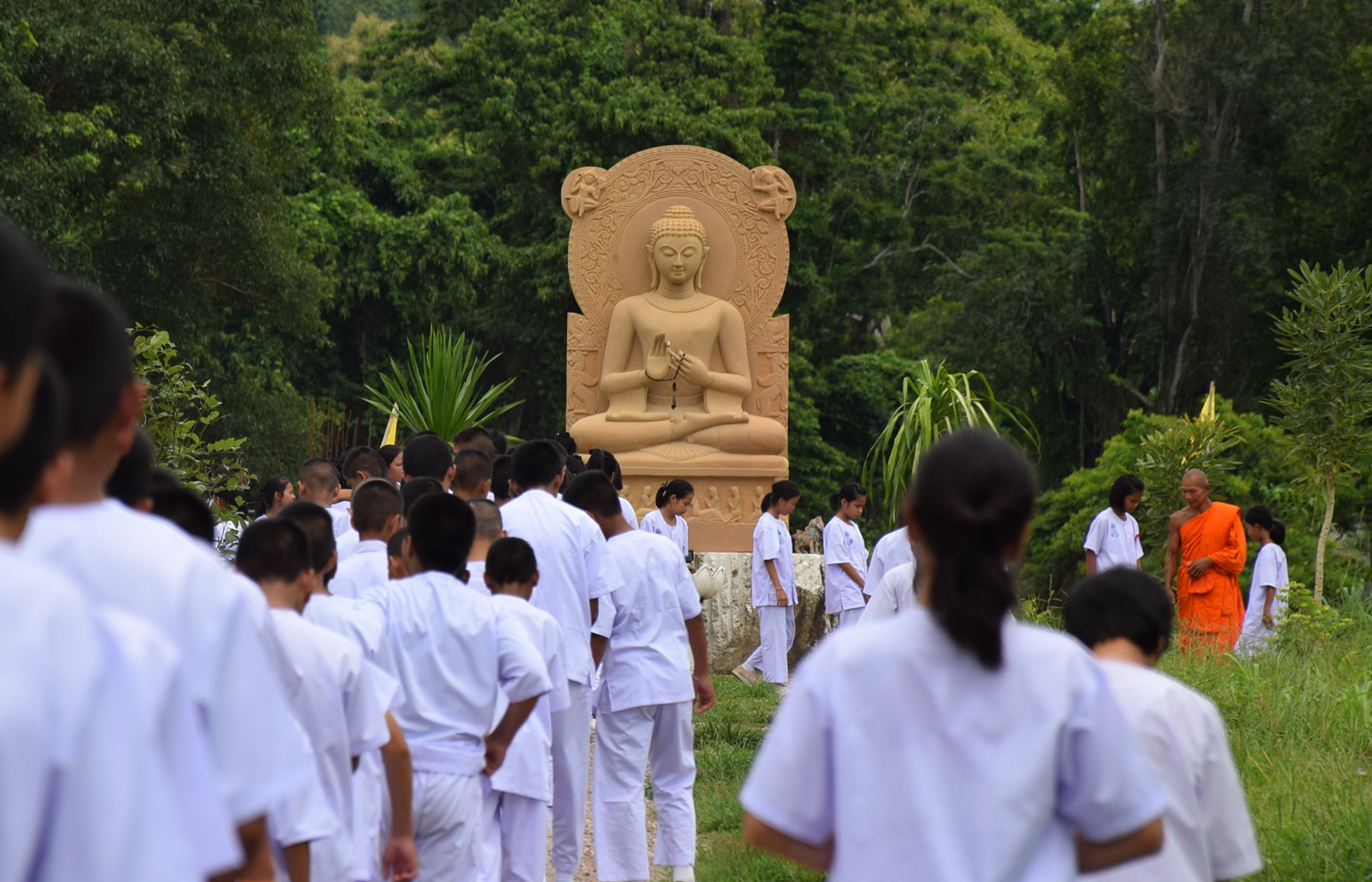
Phra Buddha Mettapanyanath (10 feet high), Wat Khung Taphao, Thailand

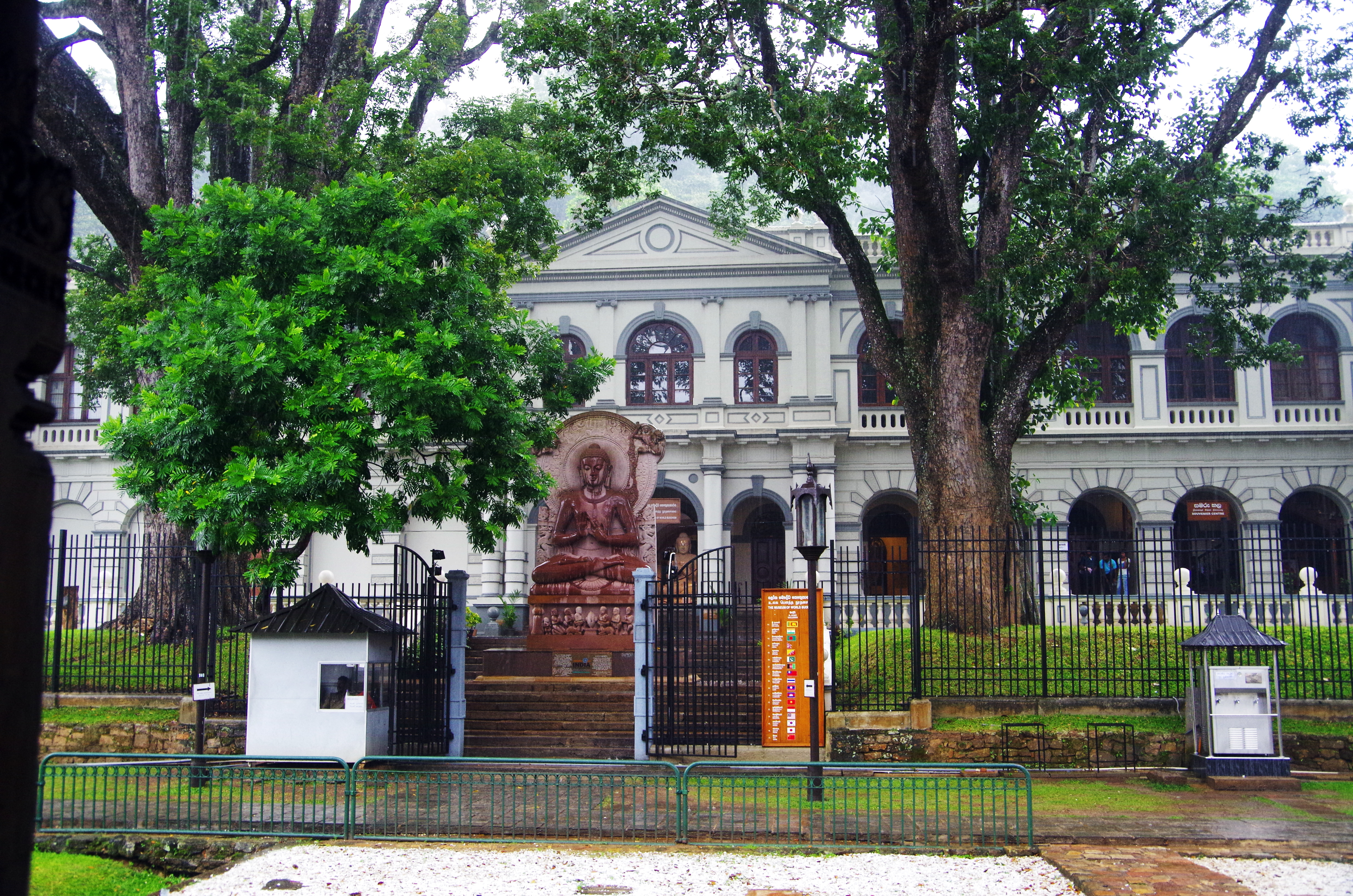
International Buddhist Museum at Kandy, Sri Lanka

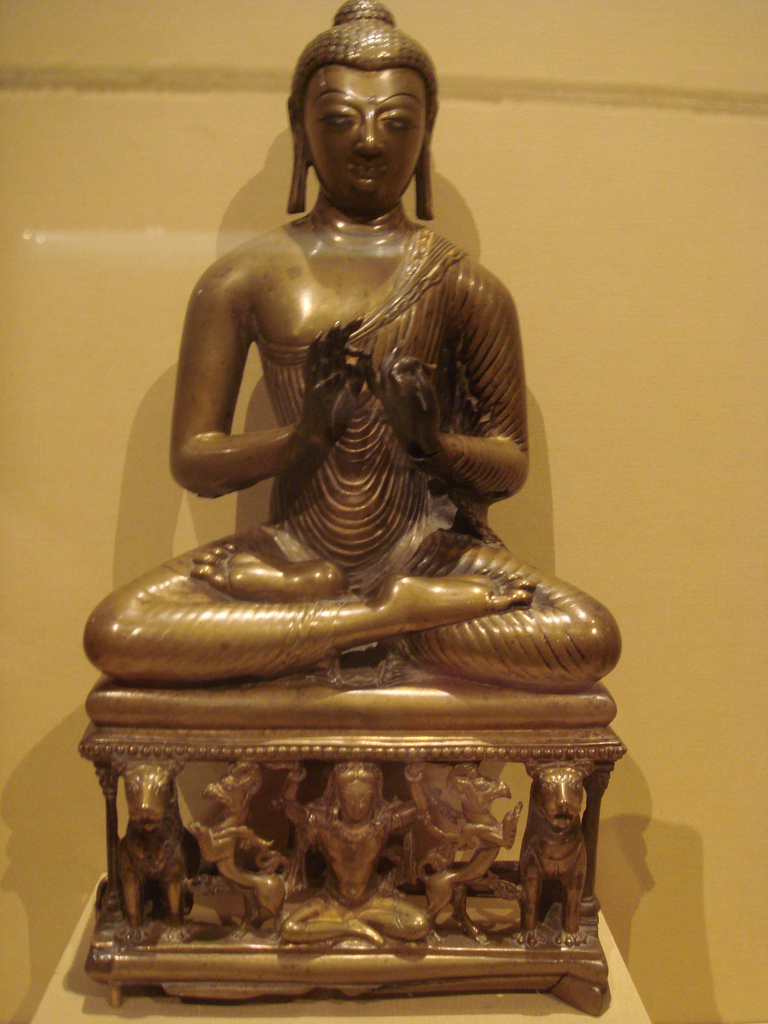
Buddha Shakyamuni or Vairochana Kashmir

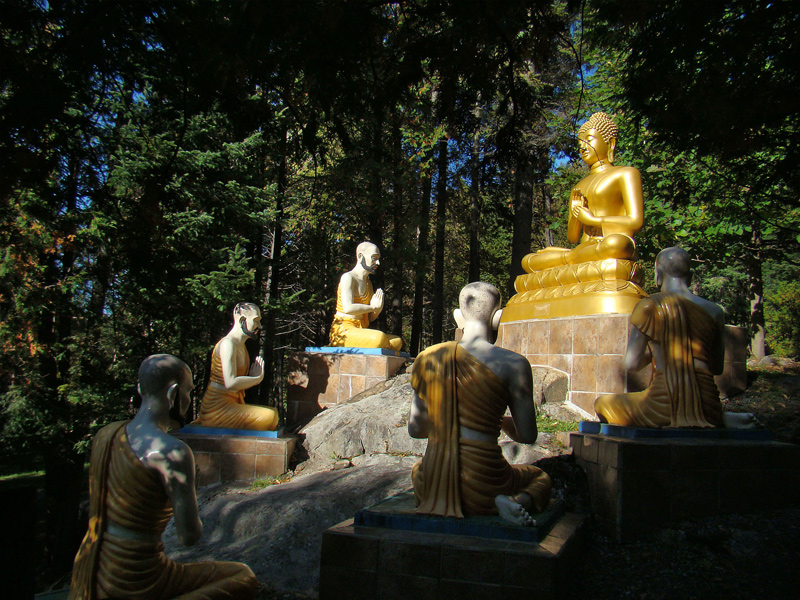
Monastery of Tam Bao Son, Quebec, Canada.

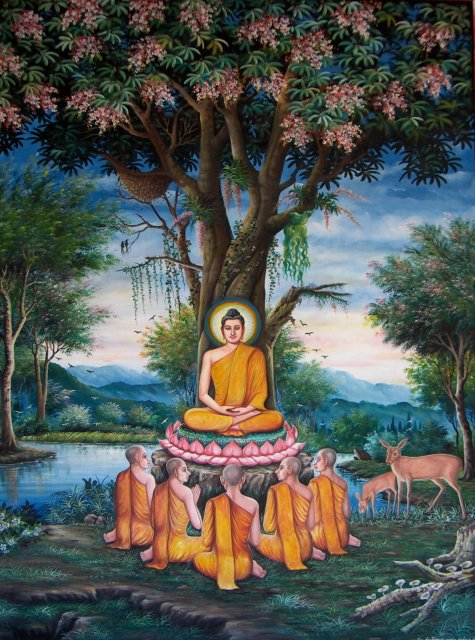
Modern Thai depiction
