= Northern Satraps =

Dynasty of Indo-Scythian rulers (60 BCE–2nd century CE)

Great Satraps Mahakṣatrapa
- 60 BCE–2nd century CE
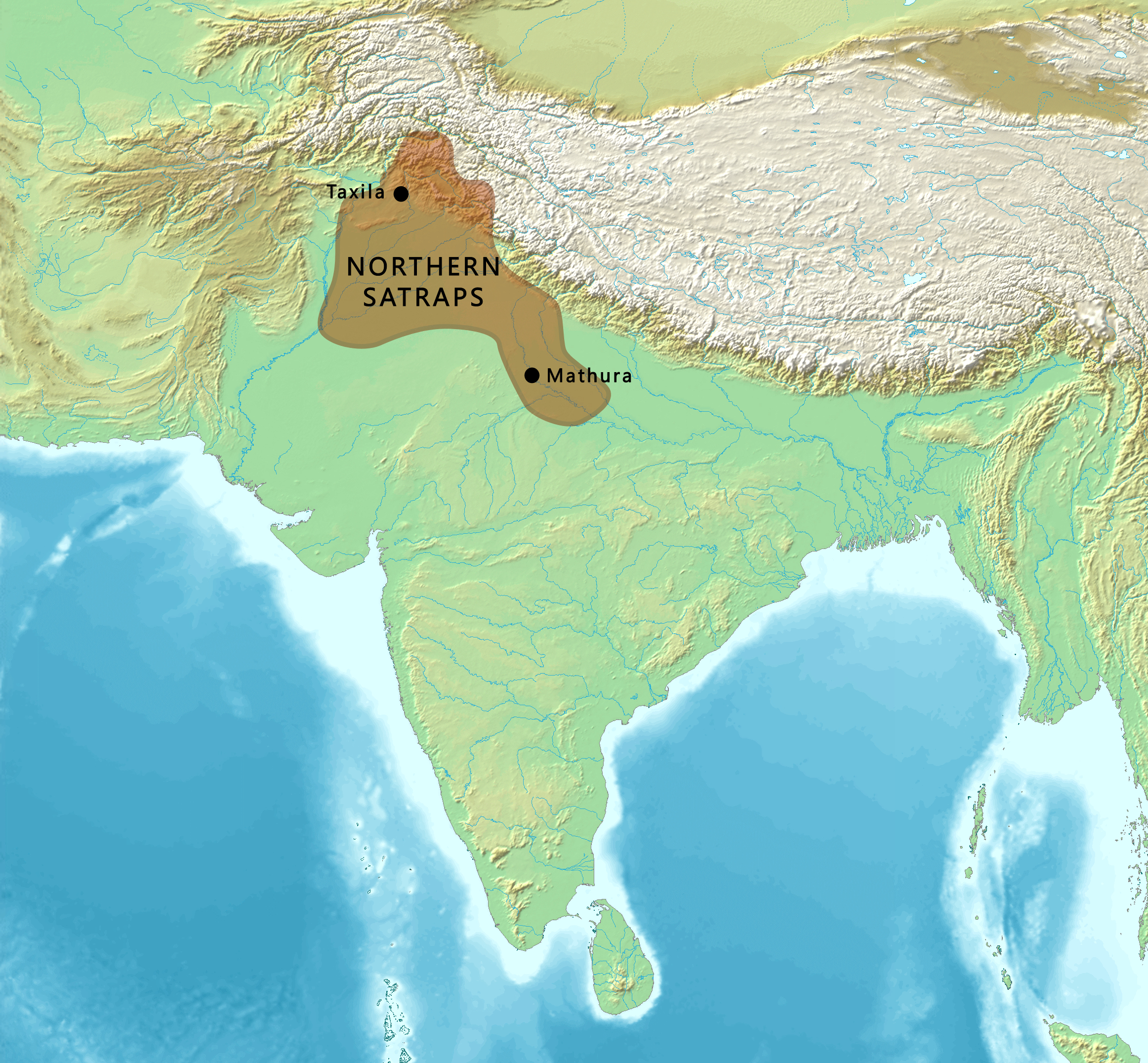
- The Northern Satraps ruled the area from Eastern Punjab to Mathura. Approximate location and neighbouring polities, early 1st century CE.
- Capital: Mathura; Taxila
- Religion: Buddhism; Hinduism; Jainism
- Government: Monarchy
- Historical era: Antiquity
  - Established: 60 BCE
  - Disestablished: 2nd century CE
Preceded by
Indo-Greeks
Indo-Scythians
Mitra dynasty
Succeeded by
Indo-Parthians
Kushan Empire
- Today part of: India; Pakistan

The Northern Satraps (Brahmi:, Kṣatrapa, "Satraps" or, Mahakṣatrapa, "Great Satraps"), or sometimes Satraps of Mathura, or Northern Sakas, are a dynasty of Indo-Scythian ("Saka") rulers who held sway over the area of Punjab and Mathura after the decline of the Indo-Greeks, from the end of the 1st century BCE to the 2nd century CE. They are called "Northern Satraps" in modern historiography to differentiate them from the "Western Satraps", who ruled in Sindh, Gujarat and Malwa at roughly the same time and until the 4th century CE. They are thought to have replaced the last of the Indo-Greek kings in the Punjab region, as well as the Mitra dynasty and the Datta dynasty of local Indian rulers in Mathura.

The Northern Satraps were probably displaced by, or became vassals of, the Kushans from the time of Vima Kadphises, who is known to have ruled in Mathura in 90–100 CE, and they are known to have acted as Satraps and Great Satraps in the Mathura region for his successor Kanishka (127–150 CE).

== Northern Satrap rulers ==
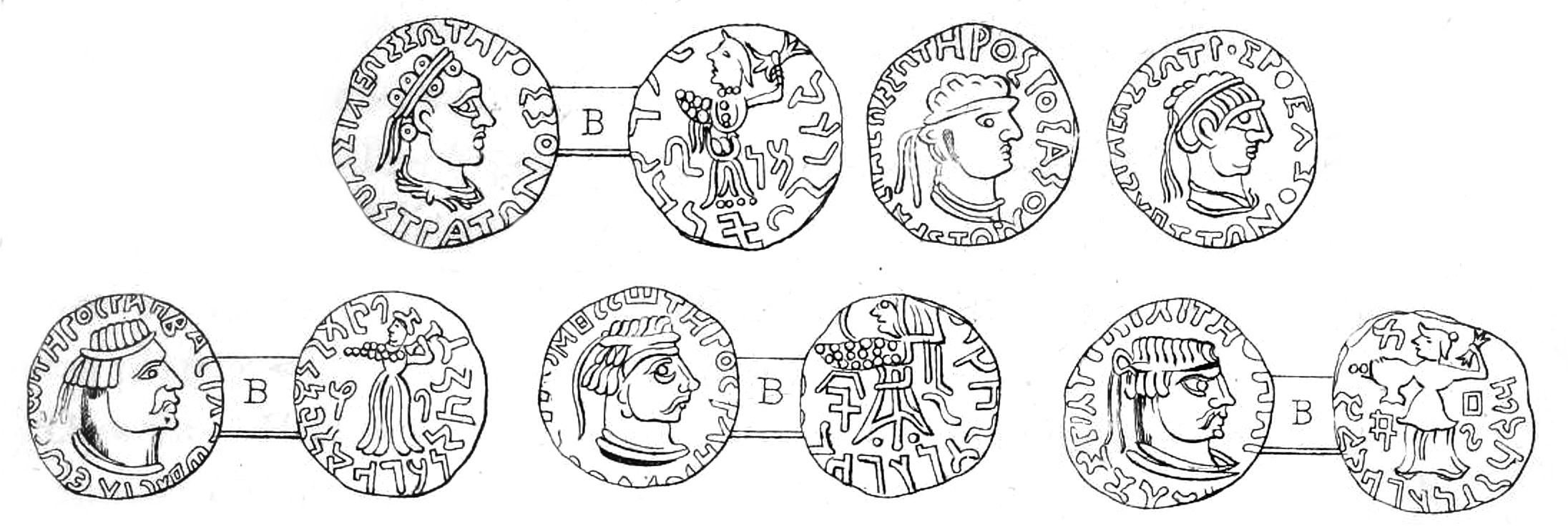
Coins of contemporary Indo-Greek ruler Strato (r.c. 25 BCE to 10 CE, top) and Indo-Scythian ruler of Mathura Rajuvula (r.c. 10 BCE to 10 CE, bottom) discovered together in a mound in Mathura. The coins of Rajuvula were derived from those of Strato.

In central India, the Indo-Scythians are thought to have conquered the area of Mathura over Indian kings, presumably the Datta dynasty, around 60 BCE. Due to being under the scrutiny of the Kushan Empire, as a satrapy and not wholly independent, they were called the Northern Satraps. Some of their first satraps were Hagamasha and Hagana, they were in turn followed by Rajuvula who gained the title Mahakshatrapa or great satrap. However, according to some authors, Rajuvula may have been first.

=== Rajuvula ===
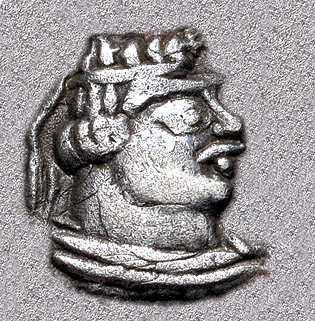
Indo-Scythian ruler Rajuvula, from his coinage.

Rajuvula is considered as one of the main Northern Satraps. He was a Great Satrap (Mahakshatrapa) who ruled in the area of Mathura in northern India in the years around 10 CE, under the authority of the Indo-Scythian king Azilises. In Mathura, he sometimes used the term "Basileus" (king) next to his title of Satrap, which implies a higher level of autonomy from the Indo-Scythian center in northwestern India. On the obverse of his coinage, he often uses in the Greek script the title "King of Kings, the Saviour".

In Mathura, Rajuvula established the famous Mathura lion capital, now in the British Museum, which confirms the presence of Northern Satraps in Mathura, and sheds some light on the relationships between the various satraps of Northern India. His coins are found near Sankassa along the Ganges and in Eastern Punjab. Their style is derived from the Indo-Greek types of Strato II. Rajuvula conquered the last remaining Indo-Greek kingdom, under Strato II, around 10 CE, and took his capital city, Sagala. Numerous coins of Rajuvula have been found in company with the coins of the Strato group in the Eastern Punjab (to the east of the Jhelum) and also in the Mathura area: for example, 96 coins of Strato II were found in Mathura in conjunction with coins of Rajuvula, who also imitated the designs of Strato II in the majority of his issues.

The coinage of the period, such as that of Rajuvula, tends to become very crude and barbarized in style. It is also very much debased, the silver content becoming lower and lower, in exchange for a higher proportion of bronze, an alloying technique (billon) suggesting less than wealthy finances.

==== Mathura lion capital ====
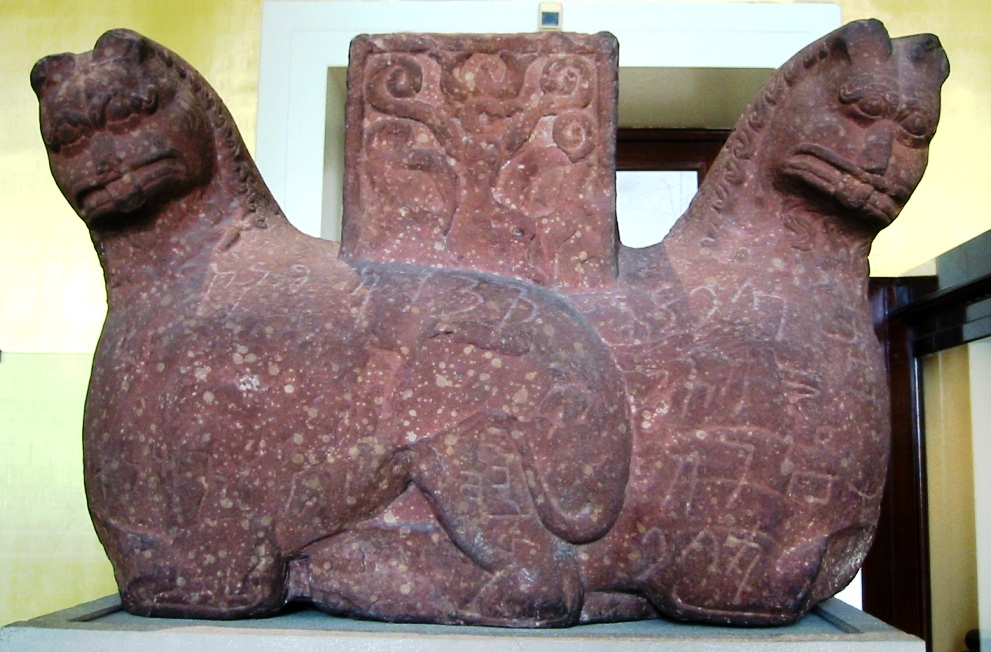
The Mathura lion capital, a dynastic production, advertising the rule of Rajuvula and his relatives, as well as their sponsorship of Buddhism. 2 BCE-6 CE.

The Mathura lion capital, an Indo-Scythian sandstone capital in crude style, from Mathura in Central India, and dated to the 1st century CE, describes in kharoshthi the gift of a stupa with a relic of the Buddha, by Queen Nadasi Kasa, the wife of the Indo-Scythian ruler of Mathura, Rajuvula.

The capital describes, among other donations, the gift of a stupa with a relic of the Buddha, by Queen Ayasia, the "chief queen of the Indo-Scythian ruler of Mathura, satrap Rajuvula". She is mentioned as the "daughter of Kharahostes" (See: Mathura Lion Capital inscriptions). The lion capital also mentions the genealogy of several Indo-Scythian satraps of Mathura. It mentions Sodasa, son of Rajuvula, who succeeded him and also made Mathura his capital.

=== Sodasa and Bhadayasa ===
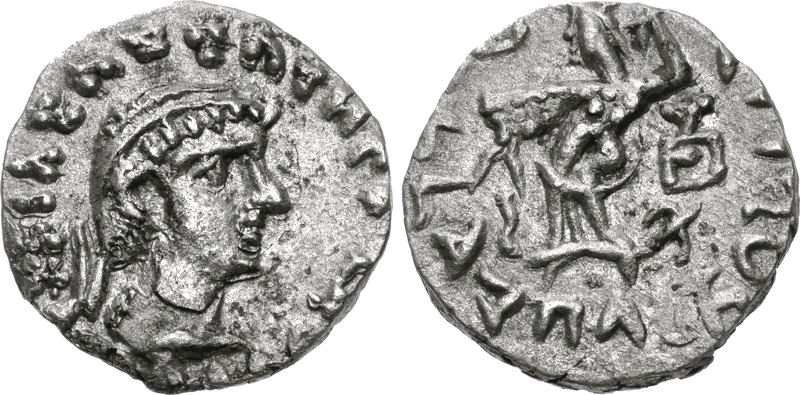
Coin of Northern Satrap Bhadayasa. Obv:Greek legend BASILEWS SWTEROS ZLIIoY "Saviour King Zoilos", an imitation of the legend of Zoilos II Rev:Maharajasa Tratarasa Bhadrayashasa, "Saviour king Bhadayasha"

Sodasa, son of Rajuvula, seems to have replaced his father in Mathura, while Bhadayasa ruled as Basileus in Eastern Punjab. Bhadayasa has some of the nicest coins of the Northern Satraps, in direct inspiration from the coins of the last Indo-Greek kings.

The coinage of Sodasa is cruder and of local content: it represents a Lakshmi standing between two symbols on the obverse with an inscription around Mahakhatapasa putasa Khatapasa Sodasasa "Satrap Sodassa, son of the Great Satrap". On the reverse is a standing Abhiseka Lakshmi (Lakshmi standing facing a Lotus flower with twin stalks and leaves) anointed by two elephants sprinkling water, as on the coins of Azilises.

Sodasa is also known from various inscriptions where he is mentioned as ruler in Mathura, such as the Kankali Tila tablet of Sodasa.

==== Contribution to Sanskrit epigraphy ====
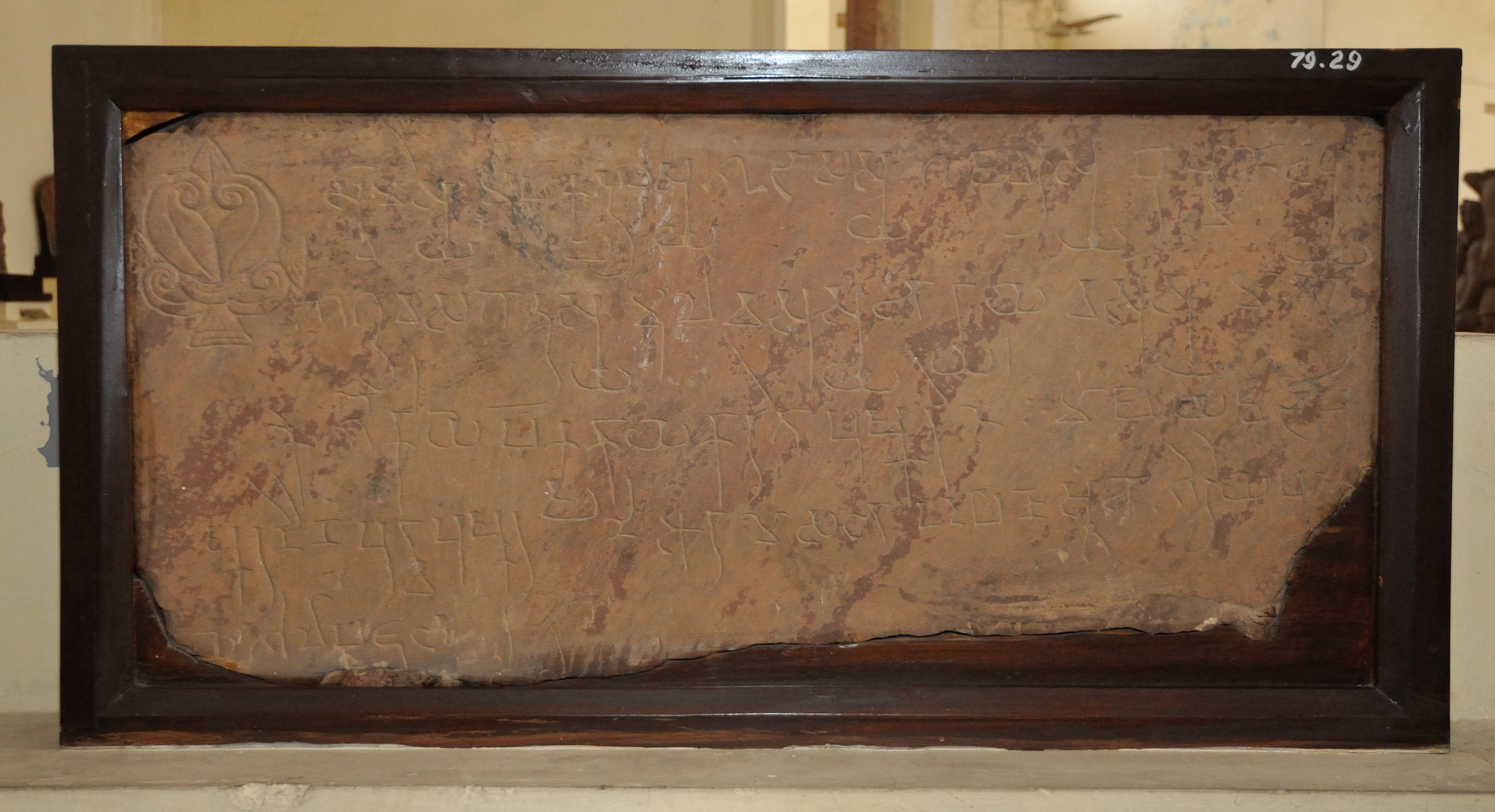
Mirzapur stele inscription in the reign Sodasa, circa 15 CE, Mirzapur village (in the vicinity of Mathura). Mathura Museum. The inscription refers to the erection of a water tank by Mulavasu and his consort Kausiki, during the reign of Sodasa, assuming the title of "Svami (Lord) Mahakshatrapa (Great Satrap)".

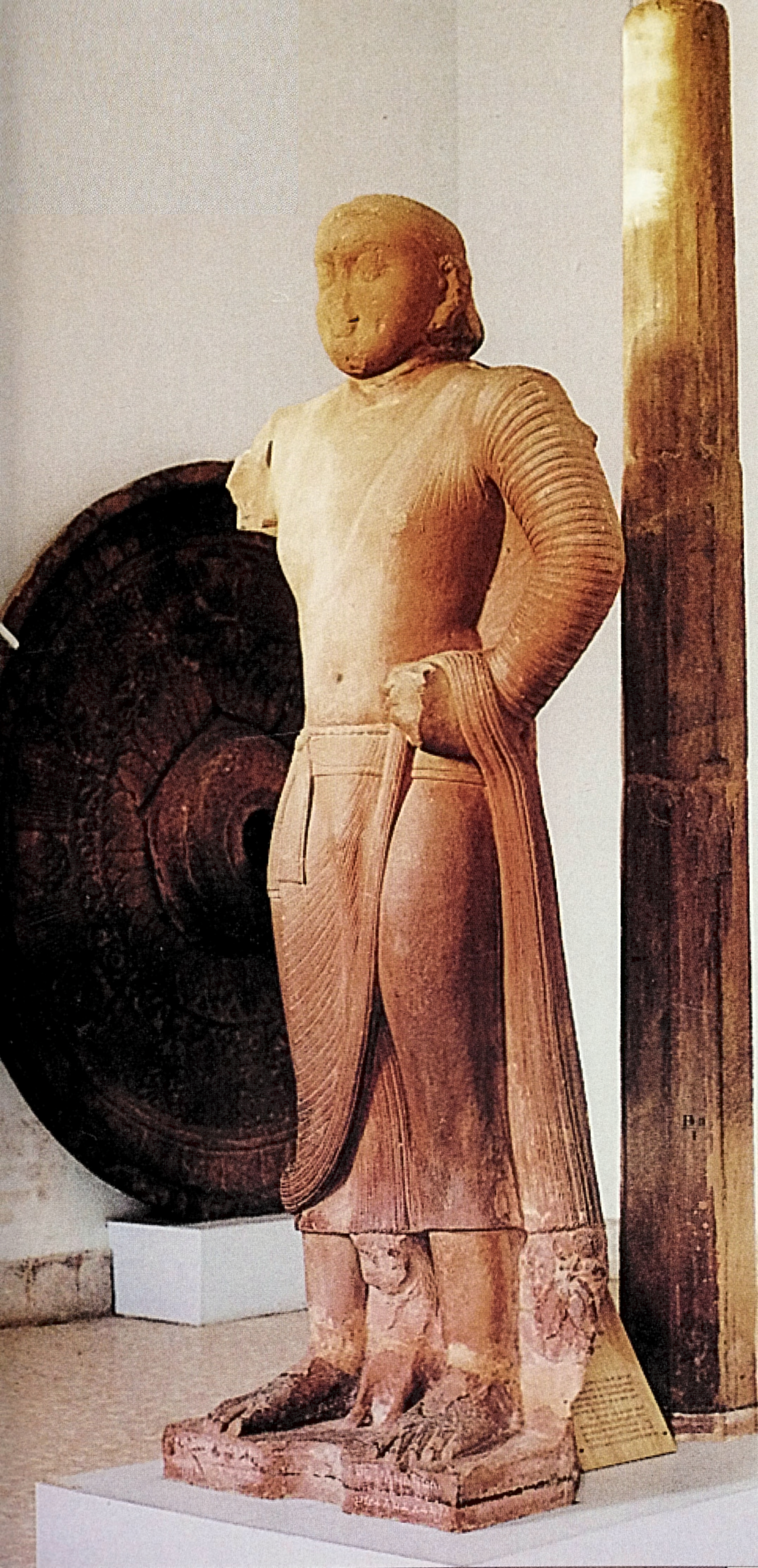
The names of the Mahakshatrapa ("Great Satrap") Kharapallana and the Kshatrapa ("Satrap") Vanaspara in the year 3 of Kanishka (circa 123 CE) were found on this statue of the Bala Bodhisattva, dedicated by "brother (Bhikshu) Bala".

In what has been described as "the great linguistical paradox of India", Sanskrit inscriptions first appeared much later than Prakrit inscriptions, although Prakrit is considered as a descendant of the Sanskrit language. This is because Prakrit, in its multiple variants, had been favoured since the time of the influential Edicts of Ashoka (circa 250 BCE).

Besides a few examples from the 1st century BCE, most of the early Sanskrit inscriptions date to the time of the Indo-Scythian rulers, either the Northern Satraps around Mathura for the earliest ones, or, slightly later, the closely related Western Satraps in western and central India. It is thought that they became promoters of Sanskrit as a way to show their attachment to Indian culture. According to Salomon "their motivation in promoting Sanskrit was presumably a desire to establish themselves as legitimate Indian or at least Indianized rulers and to curry the favor of the educated Brahmanical elite".

The Sanskrit inscriptions in Mathura (Uttar Pradesh) are dated to the 1st and 2nd-century CE. The earliest of these, states Salomon, are attributed to Sodasa from the early years of 1st-century CE. Of the Mathura inscriptions, the most significant is the Mora Well Inscription. In a manner similar to the Hathibada inscription, the Mora well inscription is a dedication inscription and is linked to the Vaishnavism tradition of Hinduism. It mentions a stone shrine (temple), pratima (murti, images) and calls the five Vrishnis as bhagavatam. There are many other Mathura Sanskrit inscriptions overlapping the era of Indo-Scythian Northern Satraps and early Kushanas, although they are still dwarfed by the number of contemporary inscriptions in Prakrit. Other significant 1st-century inscriptions in reasonably good classical Sanskrit include the Vasu Doorjamb Inscription and the Mountain Temple inscription. The early ones are related to the Brahmanical and possibly Jain traditions, as in the case of an inscription from Kankali Tila, and none are Buddhist.

The development of Sanskrit epigraphy in western India under the Western Satrap, is also thought to have been the result of the influence of the Northern Satraps on their western relatives.

=== Successors ===
Several successors are known to have ruled as vassals to the Kushans, such as the Mahakshatrapa ("Great Satrap") Kharapallana and the Kshatrapa ("Satrap") Vanaspara, who are known from an inscription discovered in Sarnath, and dated to the 3rd year of Kanishka (c. 130 CE), in which Kanishka mentions they are the governors of the eastern parts of his Empire, while a "General Lala" and Satraps Vespasi and Liaka are put in charge of the north. The inscription was discovered on an early statue of a Boddhisattva, the Sarnath Bala Boddhisattva, now in the Sarnath Museum .

== Art of Mathura under the Northern Satraps (circa 60 BCE – 90 CE) ==
From around 70 BCE, the region of Mathura fell to the Indo-Scythian Northern Satraps under Hagamasha, Hagana and then Rajuvula. During this time, Mathura is described as "a great center of Śaka culture in India". Little is known precisely from that period on terms of artistic creation. The Indo-Scythian Rajuvula, ruler of Mathura, created coins which were copies of the contemporary Indo-Greek ruler Strato II, with effigy of the king and representation of Athena on the obverse. Indo-Scythians are known to have sponsored Buddhism, but also other religions, as visible from their inscriptions and archaeological remains in northwestern and western India, as well as from their contributions to pre-Kushana sculpture in Mathura. Mathura became part of the Kushan Empire from the reign of Vima Kadphises (90-100 CE) and then became the southern capital of the Kushan Empire.

=== End of 1st century BCE ===
Some works of art dated to the end of the 1st century BCE show very delicate workmanship, such as the sculptures of Yakshis. A the very end of this period the Indo-Scythian ruler Rajuvula is also known for the famous Mathura lion capital which records events of the Indo-Scythian dynasty as well as their support of Buddhism. It is also an interesting example of the state of artistic attainment in the city of Mathura at the turn of our era. The capital portrays two lions reminiscent of the lions of the Pillars of Ashoka, but in a much cruder style. It also displays at its center a Buddhist triratana symbol, further confirming the involvement of Indo-Scythian rulers with Buddhism. The triratna is contained in a flame palmette, an element of Hellenistic iconography, and an example of Hellenistic influence on Indian art.

The fact that the Mathura lion capital is inscribed in Kharoshthi, a script used in the far northwest around the area of Gandhara, attests to the presence of northwestern artists at that time in Mathura.

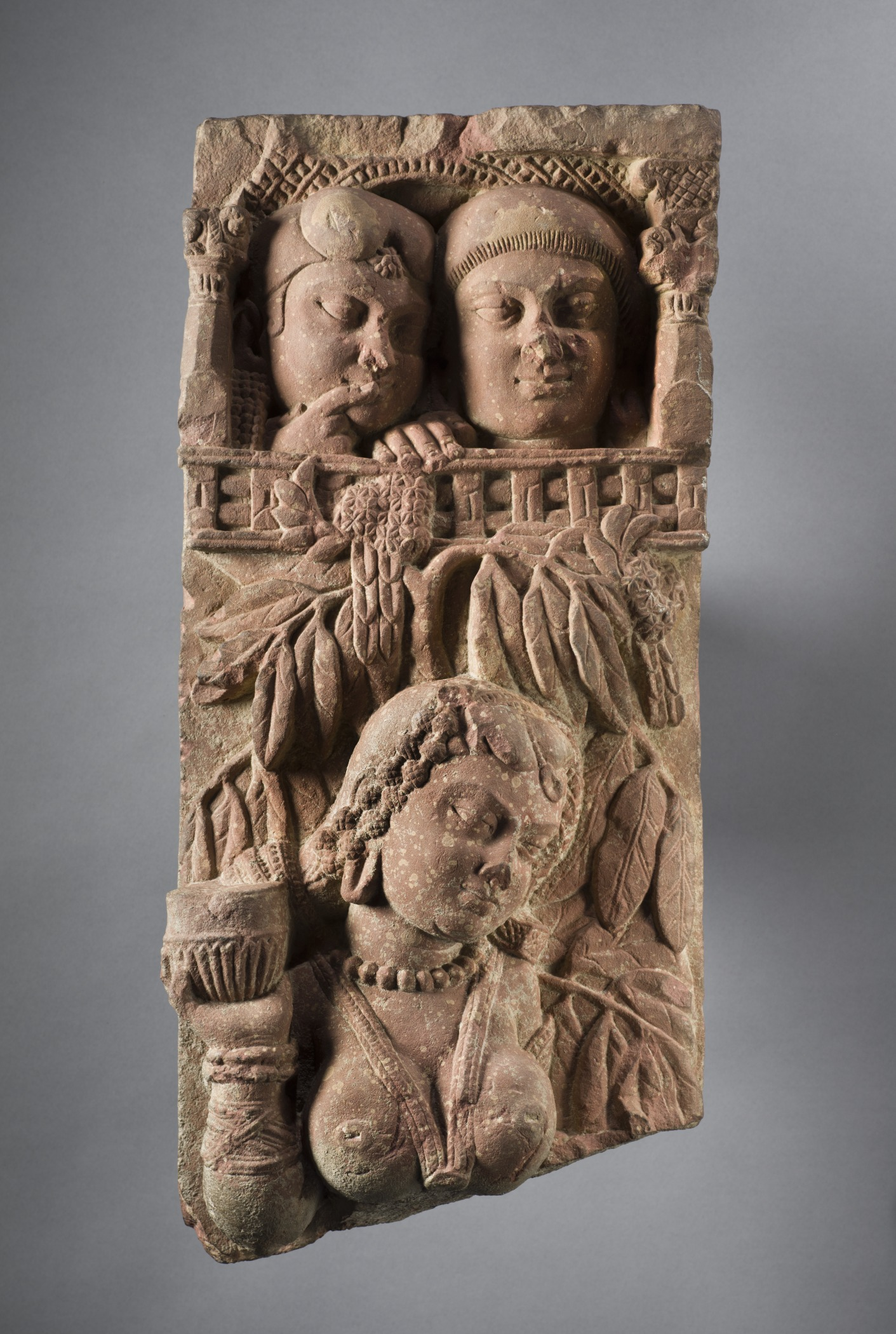
Yashi with onlookers, dated 20 BCE.

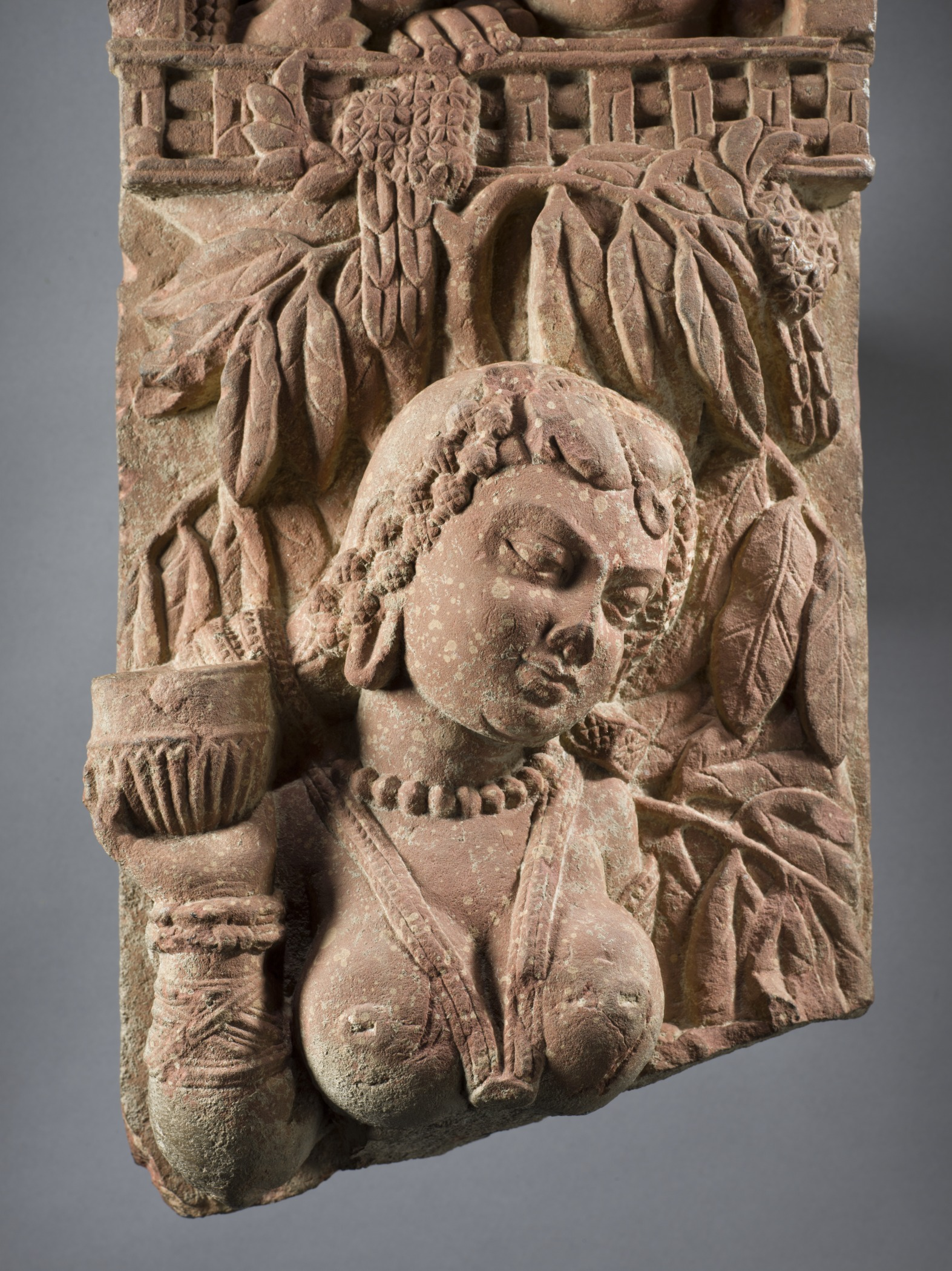
Yashi with onlookers (detail), dated 20 BCE.

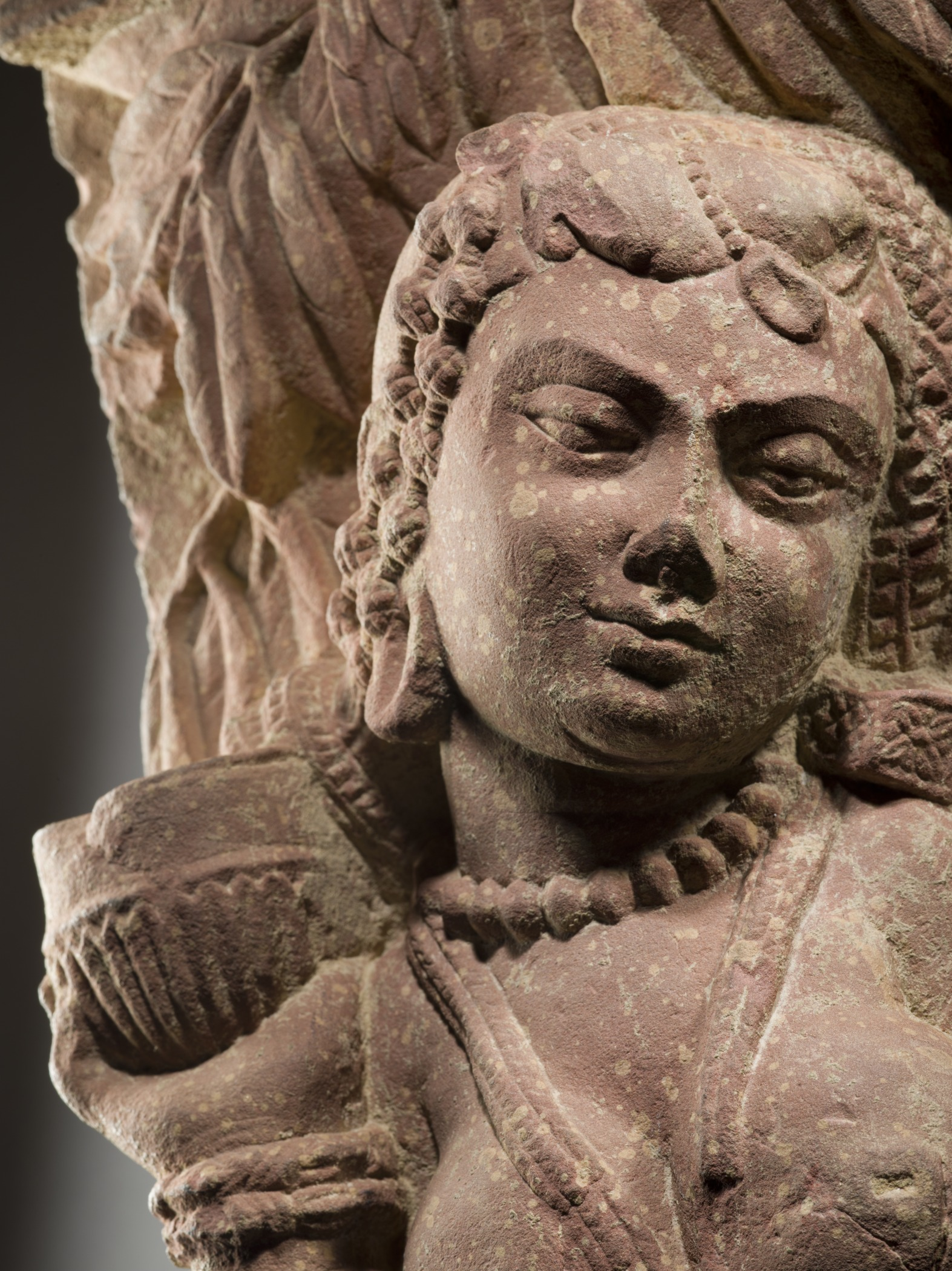
Yashi with onlookers (detail), dated 20 BCE.

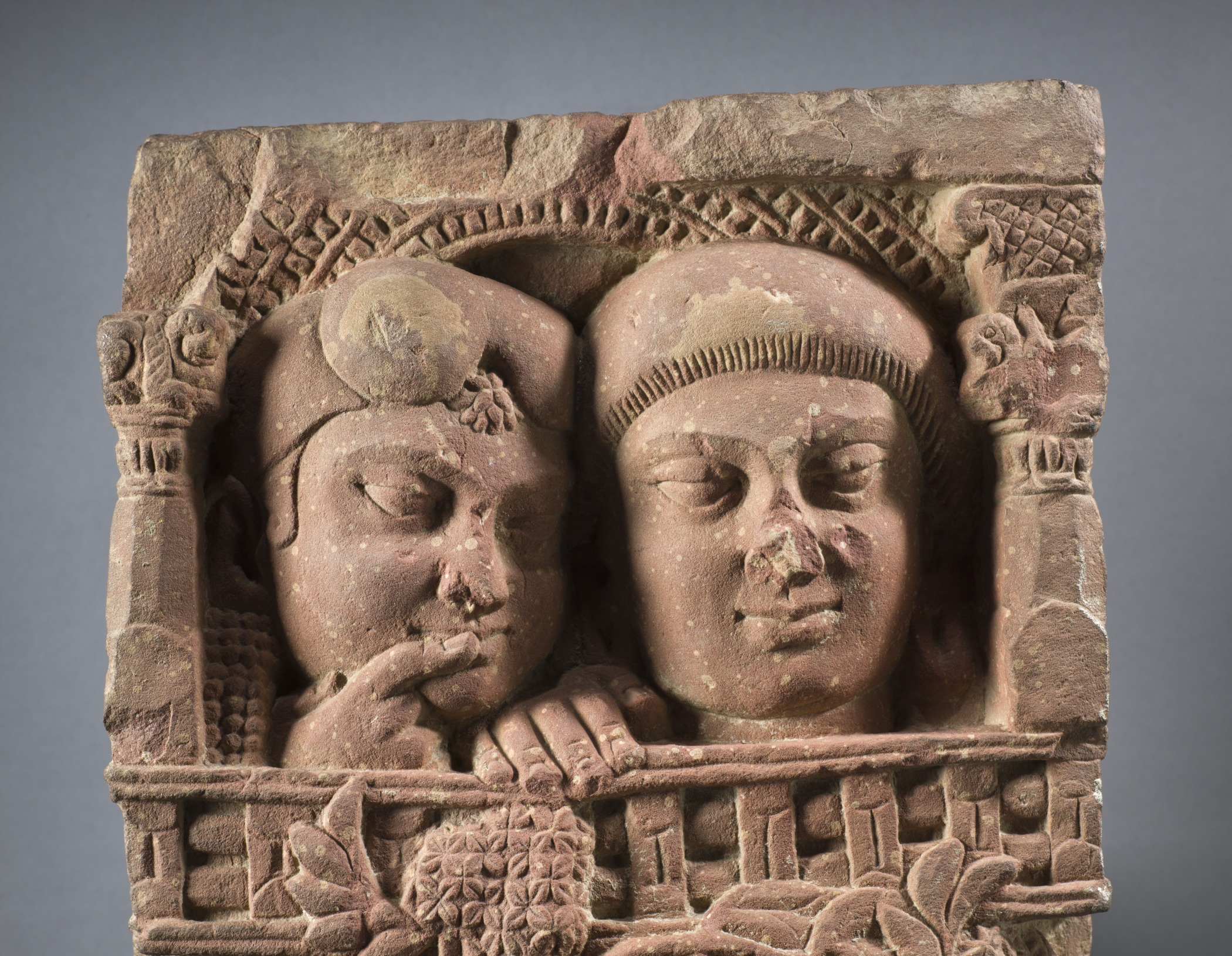
Yashi with onlookers (detail), dated 20 BCE.

=== Mathura sculpture styles in the 1st century CE ===
The abundance of dedicatory inscriptions in the name of Sodasa, the Indo-Scythian ruler of Mathura, and son of Rajuvula (eight such inscriptions are known, often on sculptural works), and the fact that Sodasa is known through his coinage as well as through his relations with other Indo-Scythian rulers whose dates are known, means that Sodasa functions as a historic marker to ascertain the sculptural styles at Mathura during his rule, in the first half of the 1st century CE. These inscriptions also correspond to some of the first known epigraphical inscriptions in Sanskrit. The next historical marker corresponds to the reign of Kanishka under the Kushans, whose reign began circa 127 CE. The sculptural styles at Mathura during the reign of Sodasa are quite distinctive, and significantly different from the style of the previous period circa 50 BCE, or the styles of the later period of the Kushan Empire in the 2nd century CE.

==== In-the-round statuary ====
Mora sculptures (c. 15 CE)
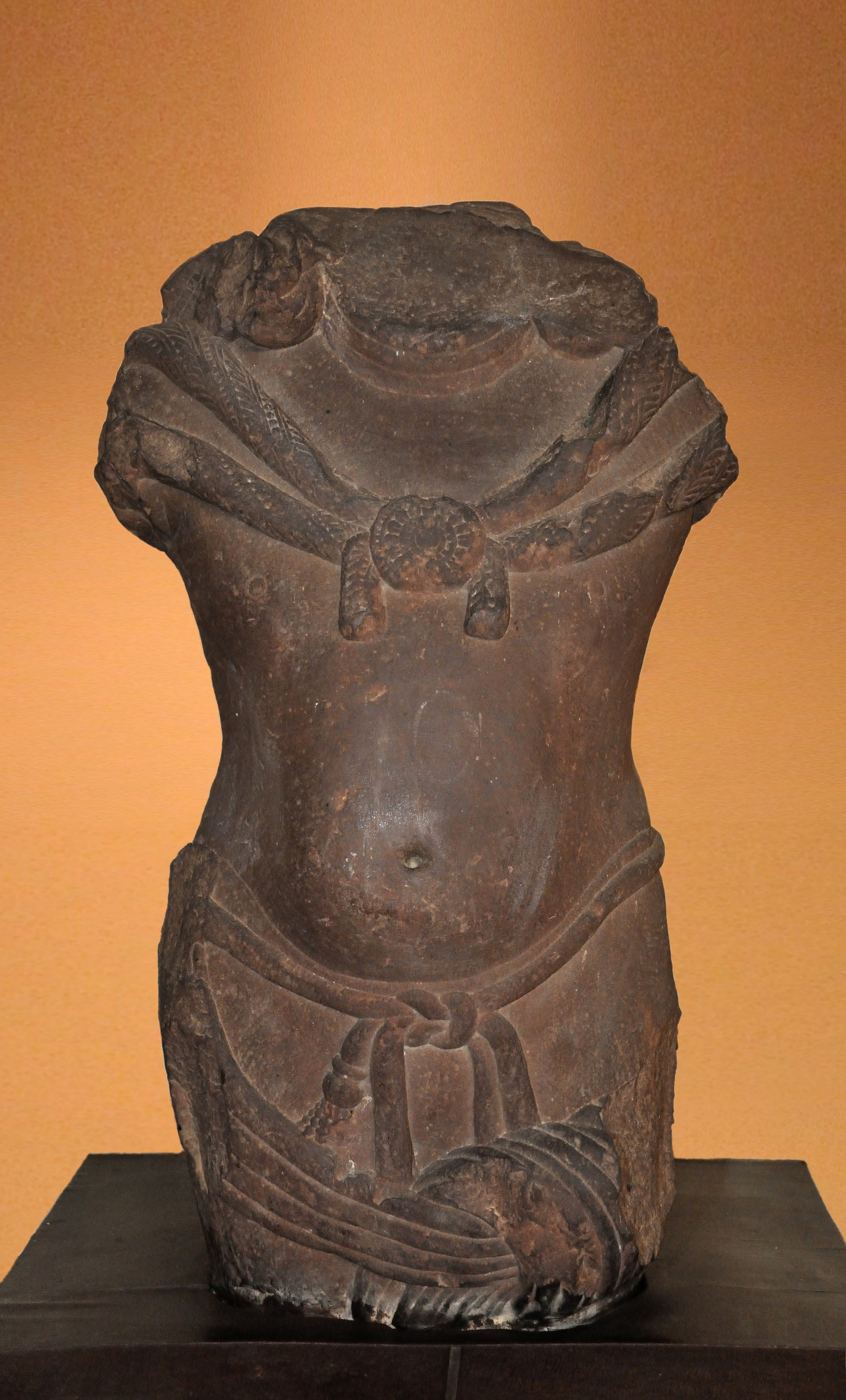
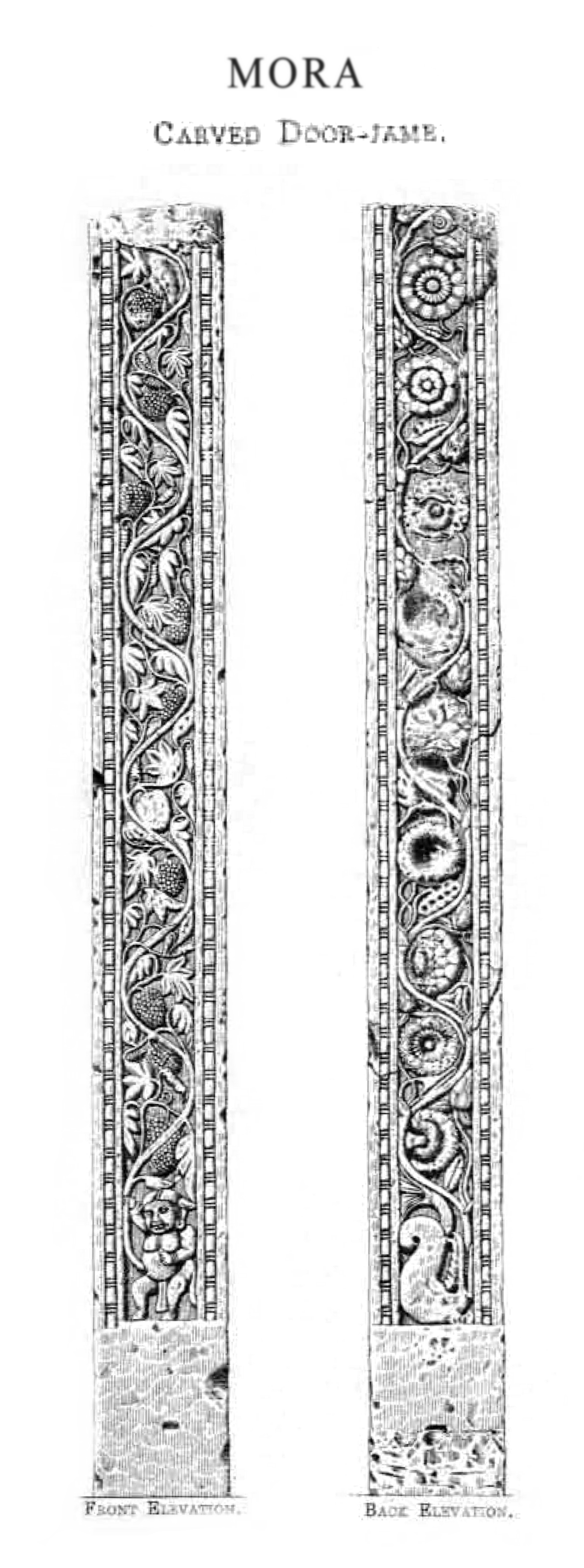
The Mora well inscription of Great Satrap Sodasa (15 CE) is associated with three statue remains and a decorated doorjamb, all thought to be related to a temple built for the Vrishni heroes. Left: torso said to be probably a figure of one of the five Vrishni heroes, Mora, circa 15 CE, Mathura Museum. Right: Mora carved doorjamb with grapevine design, also circa 15 CE.

Several examples of in-the-round statuary have been found from the period of Sodasa, such as the torsos of "Vrishni heroes", discovered in Mora, about 7 kilometers west of Mathura. These statues are mentioned in the Mora Well Inscription nearby, made in the name of the Northern Satrap Sodasa circa 15 CE, in which they are called Bhagavatam. The statue fragments are thought to represent some of the five Vrishni heroes, possibly ancient kings of Mathura later assimilated to Vishnu and his avatars, or, equally possible, the five Jain heroes led by Akrūra, which are well attested in Jain texts. In fact, the cult of the Vrishnis may have been cross-sectarian, much like the cult of the Yakshas.

The two uninscribed male torsos that were discovered are both of high craftsmanship and in Indian style and costume. They are bare-chested but wear a thick necklace, as well as heavy hearrings. The two torsos that were found are similar with minor variations, suggesting they may have been part of a series, which is coherent with the Vrishni interpretation. They share some sculptural characteristics with the Yaksha statues found in Mathura and dating to the 2nd and 1st century BCE, such as the sculpting in the round, or the clothing style, but the actual details of style and workmanship clearly belong to the time of Sodasa. The Vrishni statues also are not of the colossal type, as they would only have stood about 1.22 meters complete. The Mora Vrishnis function as an artistic benchmark for in-the-round statues of the period.

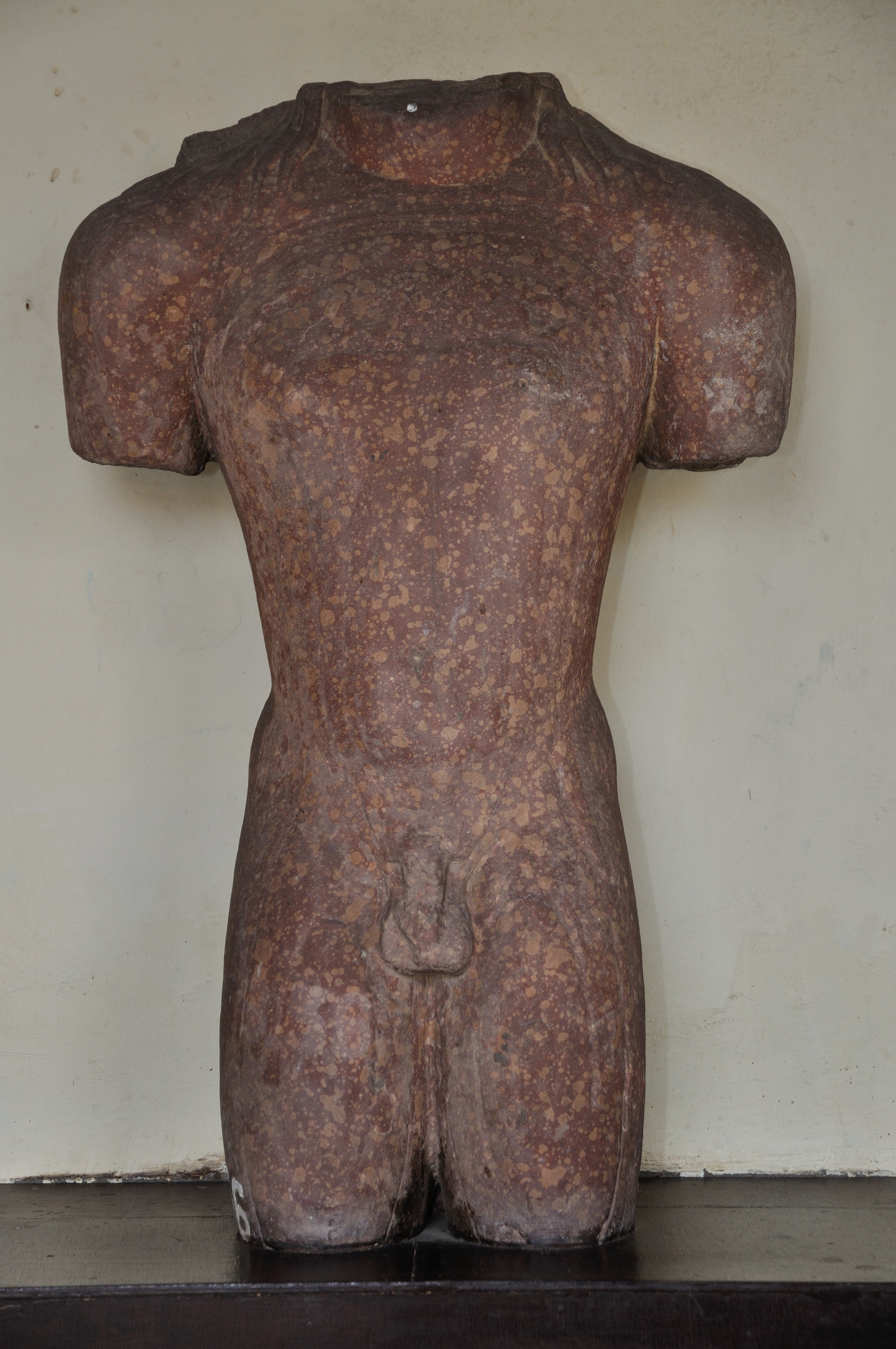
1st Jaina Tirthankara Rishabhanatha torso - Circa 1st Century

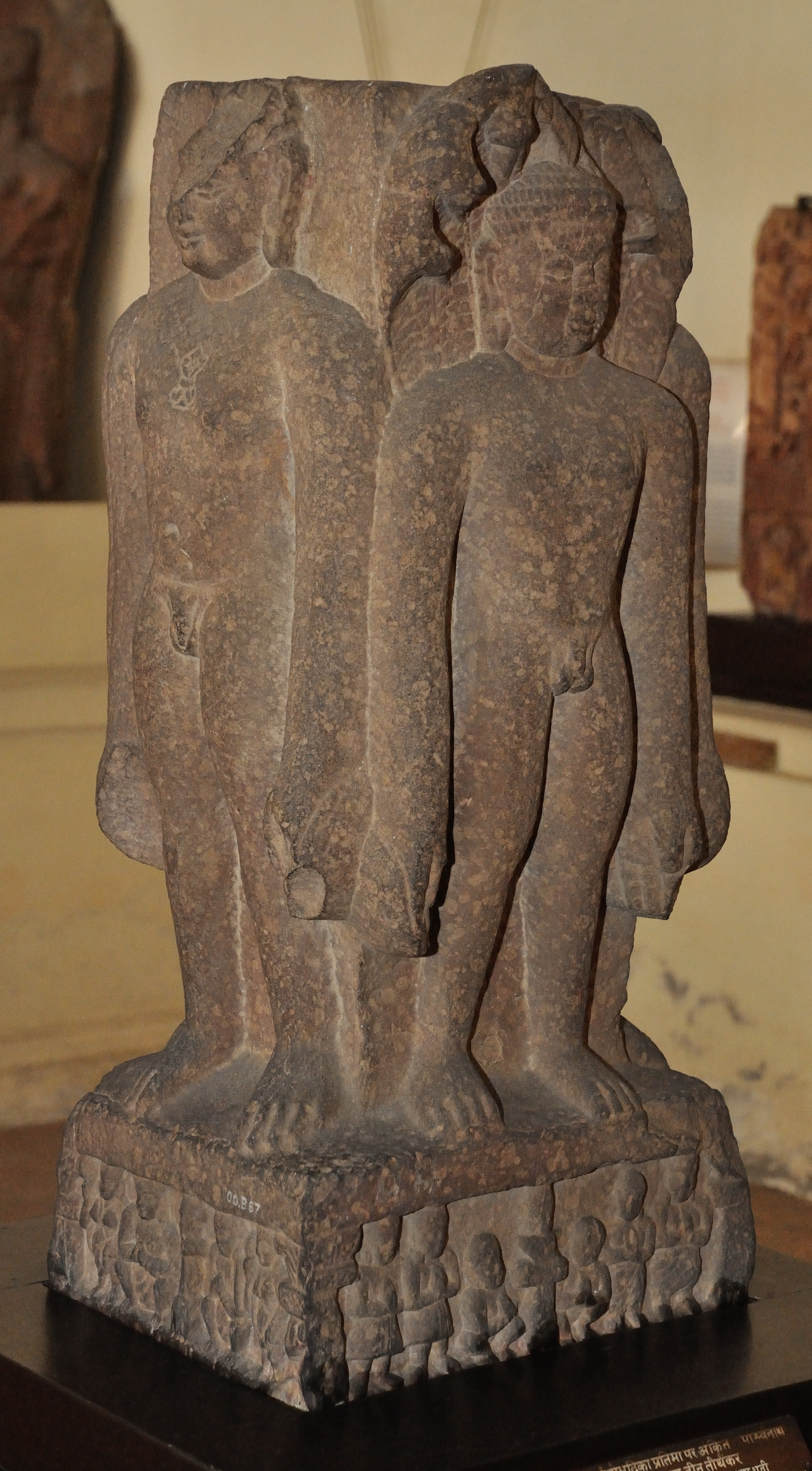
Four-fold Jain image with Suparshvanath and three other Tirthankaras - Circa 1st Century CE

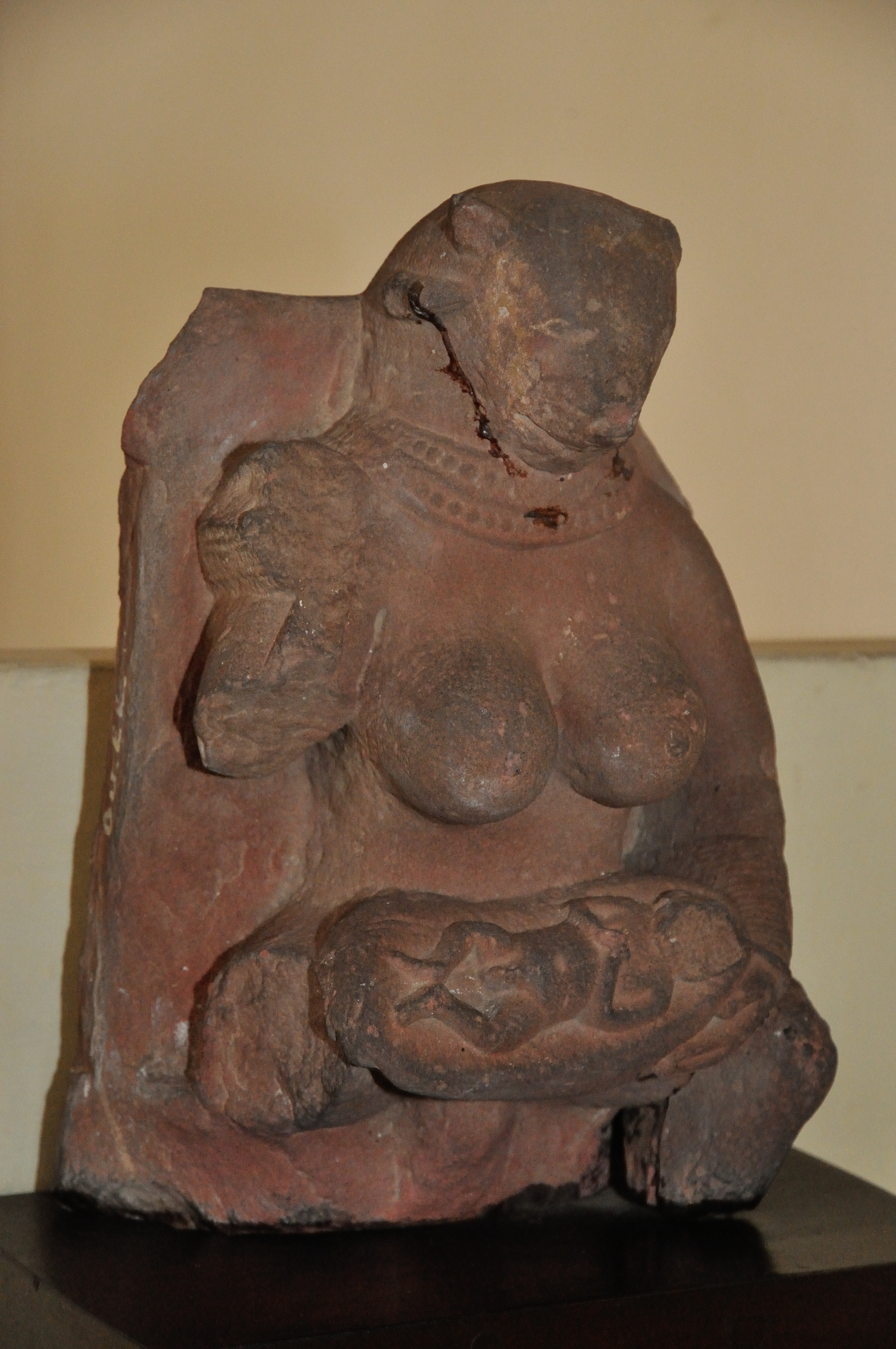
Goat-headed Jain Mother Goddess, circa 1st Century CE

==== Jain reliefs ====
Kankali Tila tablet of Sodasa

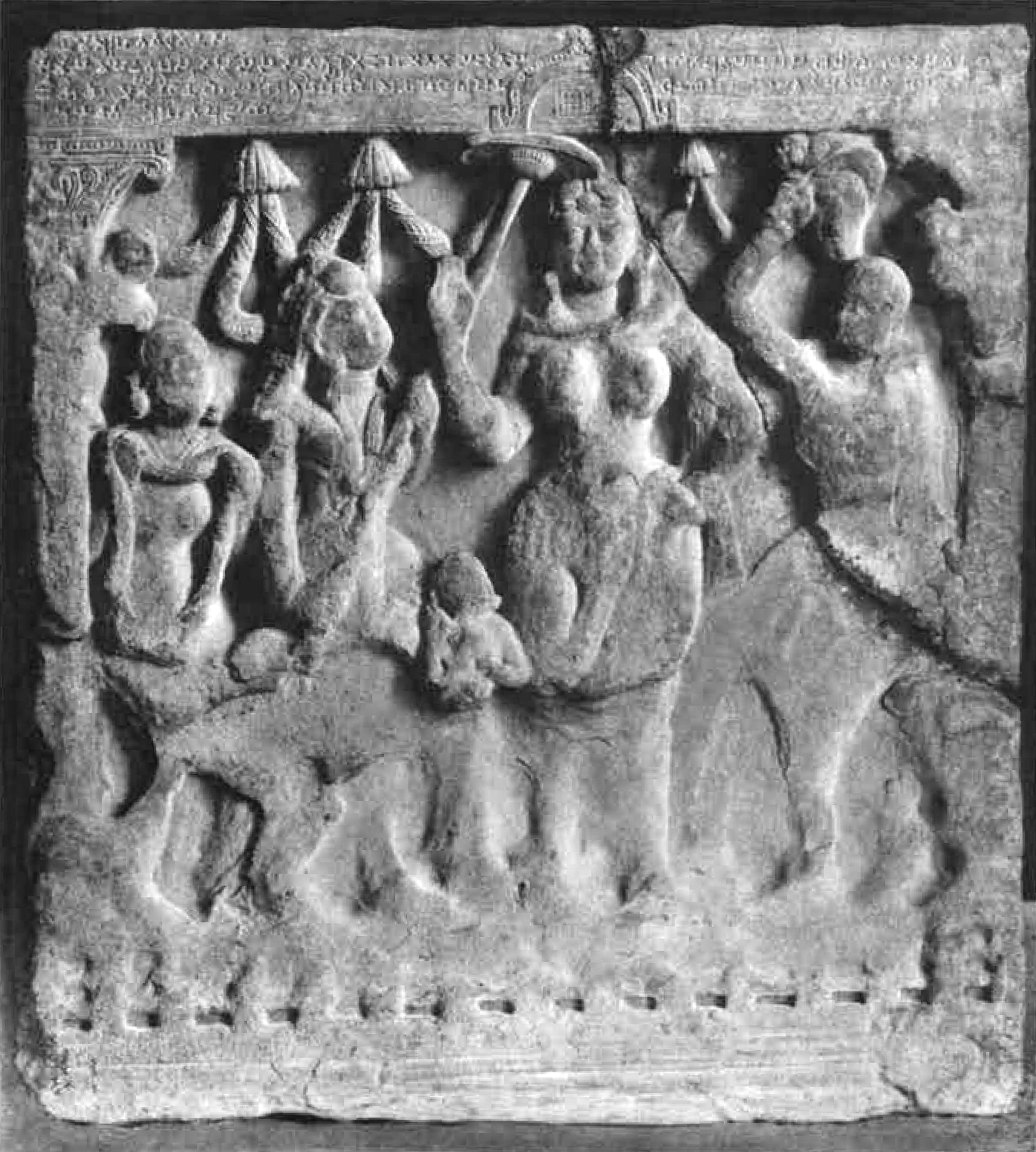
Jain Kankali Tila tablet of Sodasa or "Amohini relief", inscribed "in the reign of Sodasa", circa 15 CE. State Museum Lucknow, SML J.1

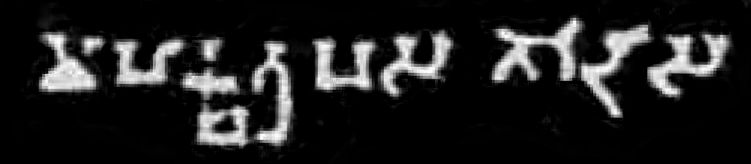
Brahmi inscription in the tablet:

Mahakṣatrapasa Śodāsa
"Great Satrap Sodasa"

Many of the sculptures from this period are related to the Jain religion, with numerous relief showing devotional scenes, such as the Kankali Tila tablet of Sodasa in the name of Sodasa. Most of these are votive tablets, called ayagapata.

Jain votive plates, called "Ayagapatas", are numerous, and some of the earliest ones have been dated to circa 50-20 BCE. They were probably prototypes for the first known Mathura images of the Buddha. Many of them were found around the Kankali Tila Jain stupa in Mathura.

Notable among the design motifs in the ayagapatas are the pillar capitals displaying "Persian-Achaemenian" style, with side volutes, flame palmettes, and recumbent lions or winged sphinxes.

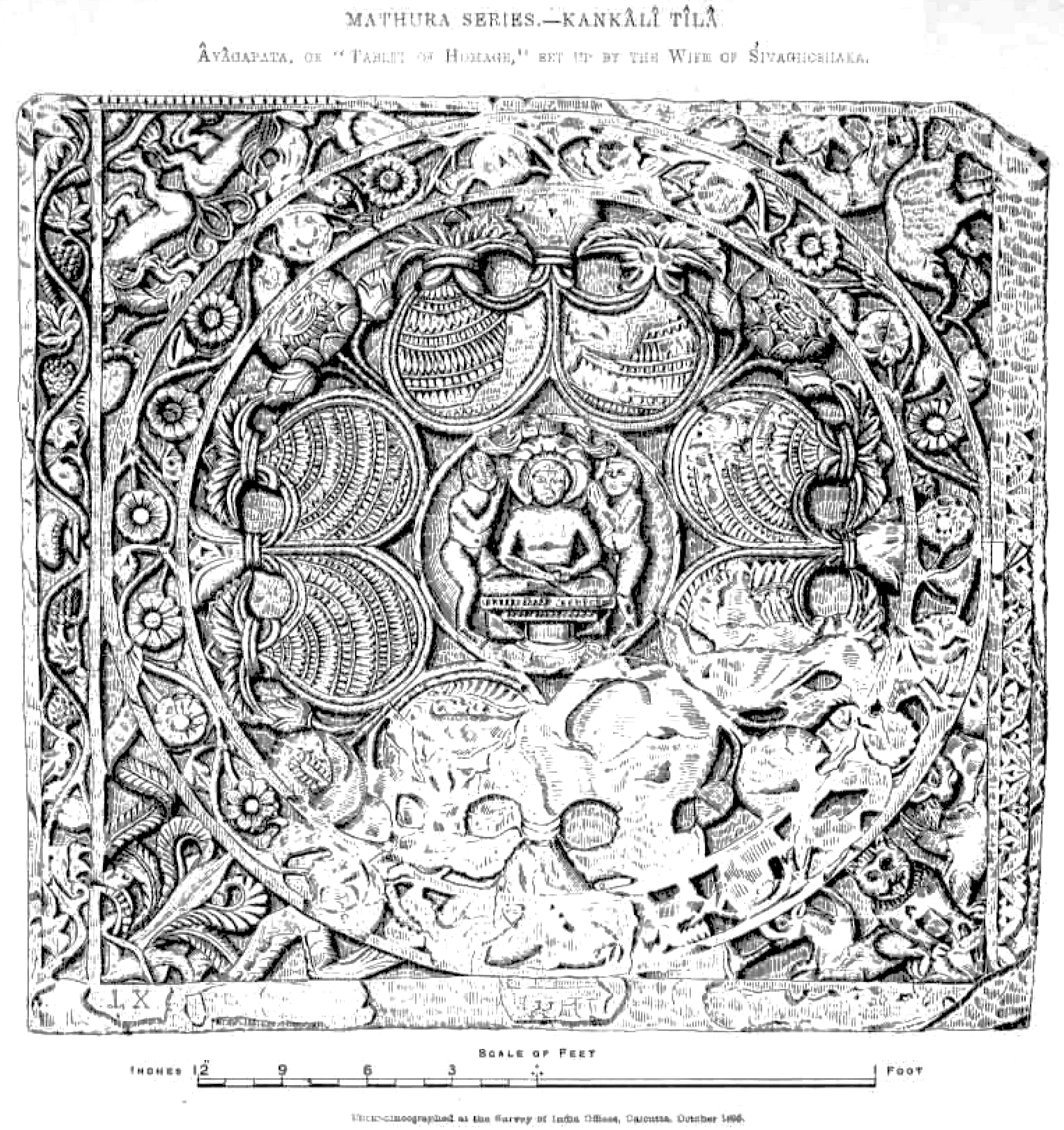
The Jina Parsvanatha ayagapata, Mathura circa 15 CE, Lucknow Museum.

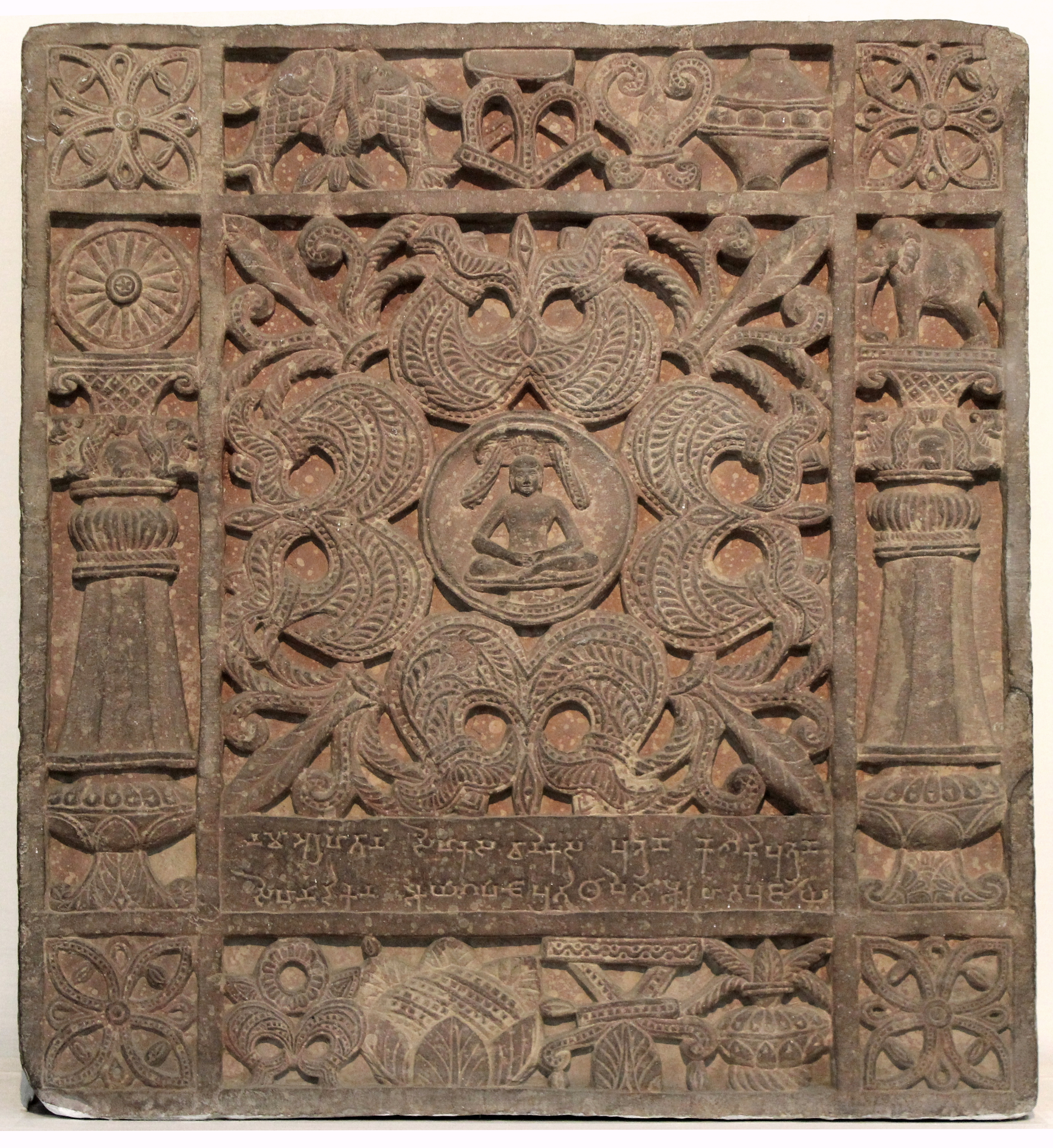
"Sihanāṃdikā ayagapata", Jain votive plate, dated 25-50 CE.

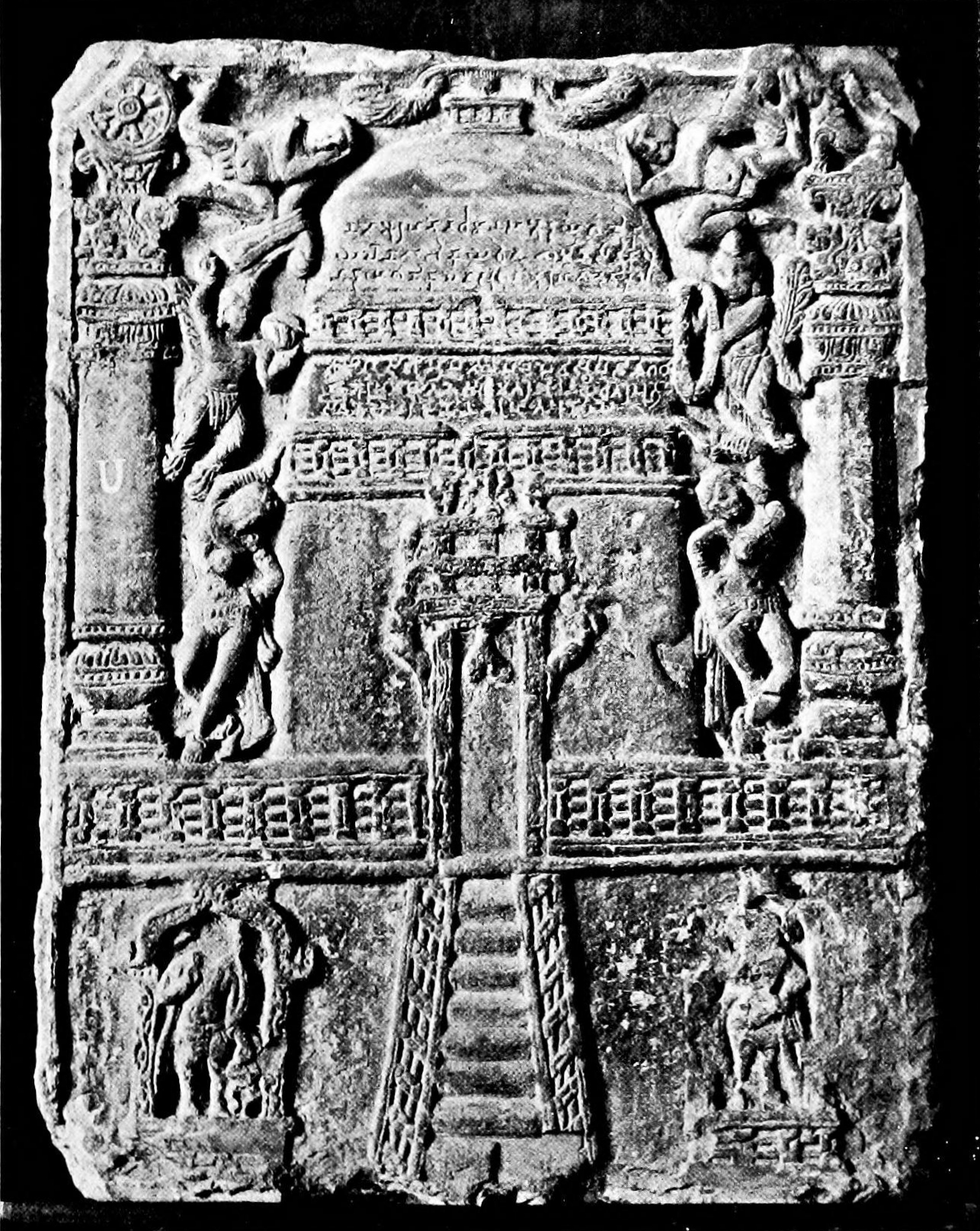
Jain votive plaque with Jain stupa, the "Vasu Śilāpaṭa" ayagapata, 1st century CE, excavated from Kankali Tila, Mathura.

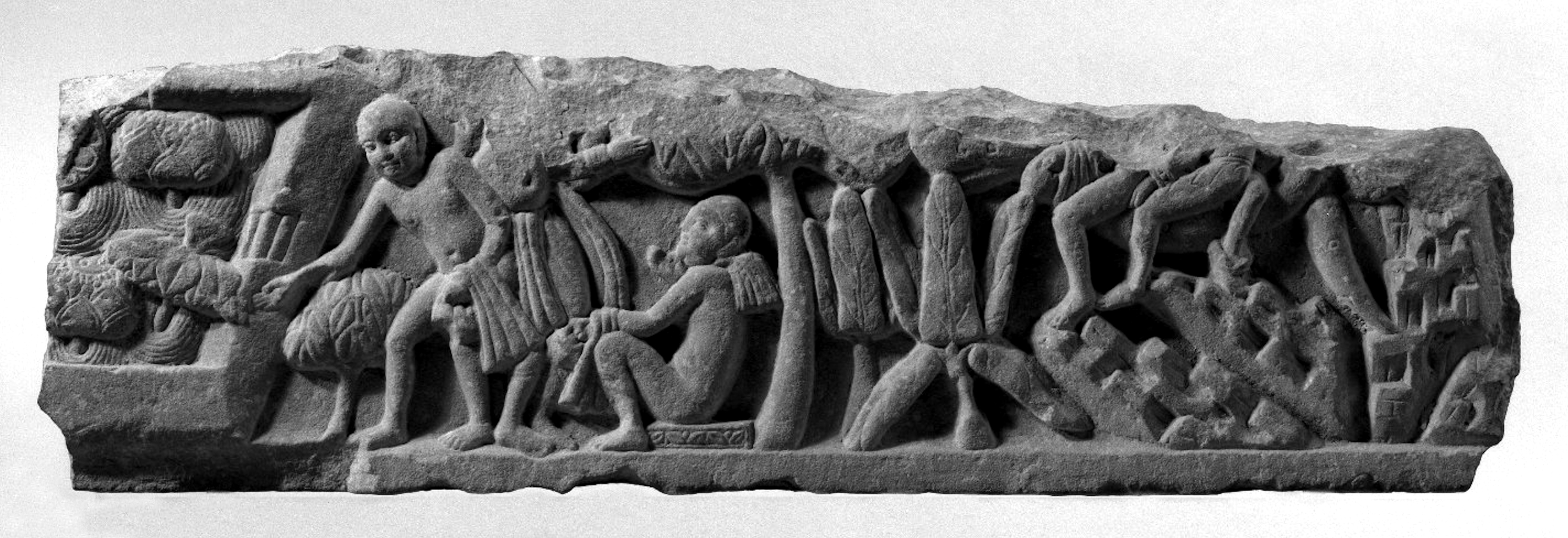
Jain relief showing monks of the ardhaphalaka sect. Early 1st century CE.

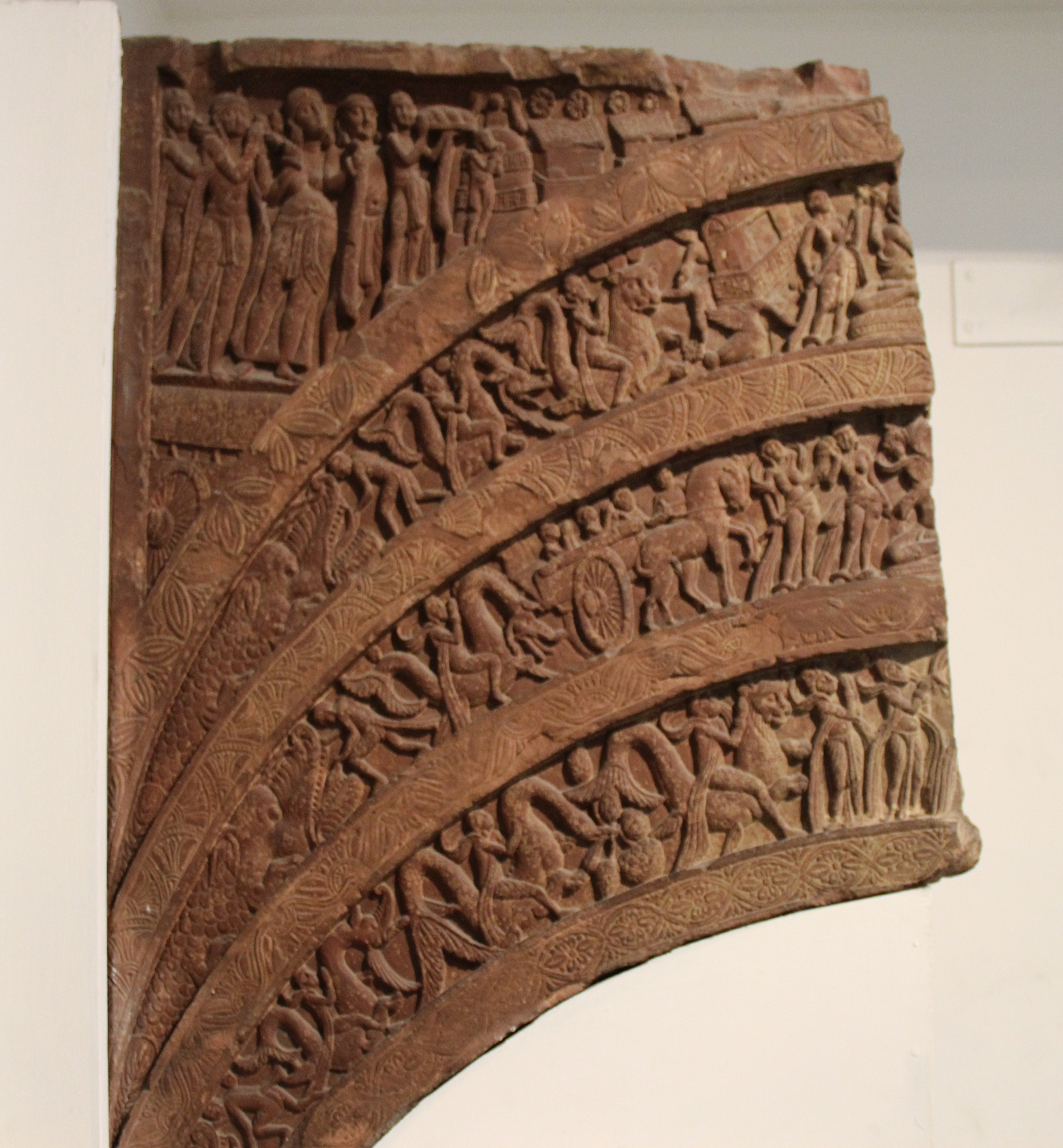
Jain decorated tympanum from Kankali Tila, Mathura, 15 CE.

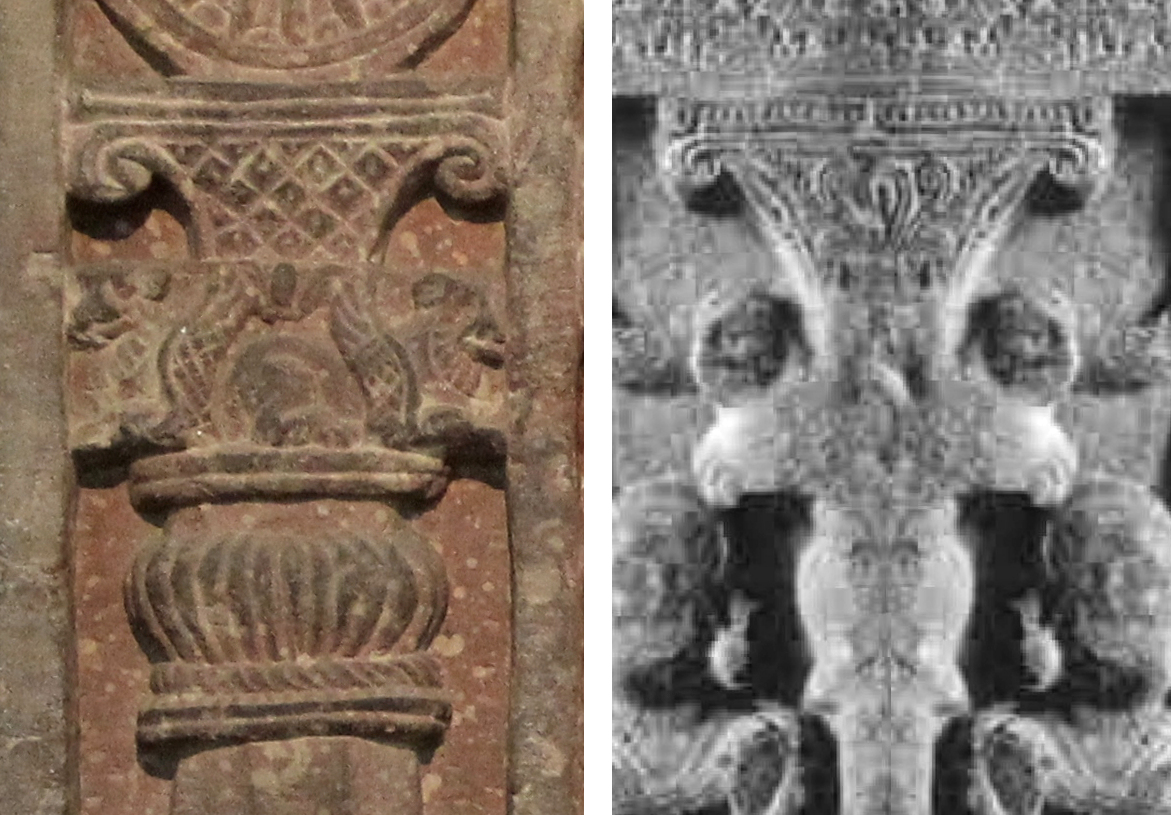
"Persian Achaemenian" style capitals appearing in ayagapatas, Mathura, 15-50 CE.

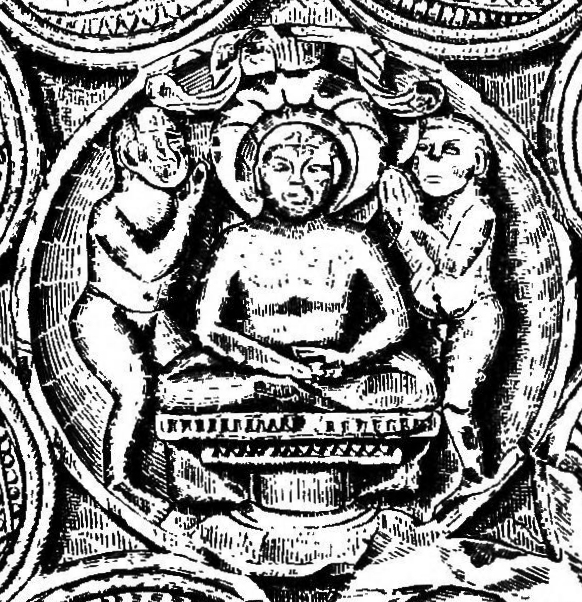
The Jina Parsvanatha (detail of an ayagapata), highly similar to the Isapur Buddha, Mathura circa 15 CE, Lucknow Museum.

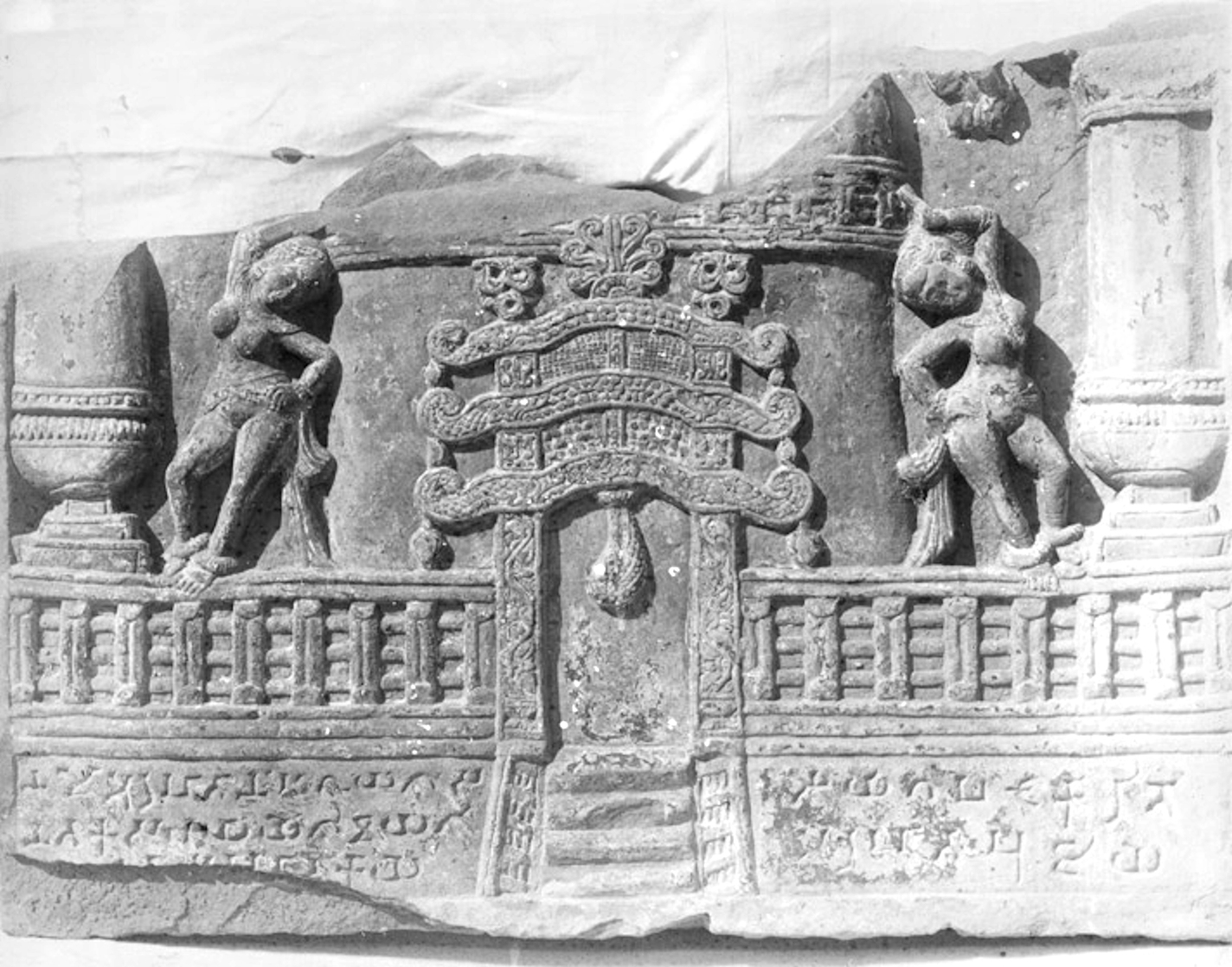
Sivayasa Ayagapata, with Jain stupa fragment, Kankali Tila, 75-100 CE.

==== Grapevine and garland designs (circa 15 CE) ====
A decorated doorjamb, the Vasu doorjamb, dedicated to deity Vāsudeva, also mentions the rule of Sodasa, and has similar carving to the Mora doorjamb, found in relation with the Mora well inscription in a similar chronological and religious context. The decoration of these and many similar doorjambs from Mathura consists in scrolls of grapevines. They are all dated to the reign of Sodasa, circa 15 CE and constitute a secure dated artistic reference for the evaluation of datation of other Mathura sculptures. It has been suggested that the grapevine design had been introduced from the Gandhara area in the northwest, and maybe associated with the northern taste of the Satrap rulers. These designs may also be the result of the work of northern artists in Mathura. The grapevine designs of Gandhara are generally considered as originating from Hellenistic art.

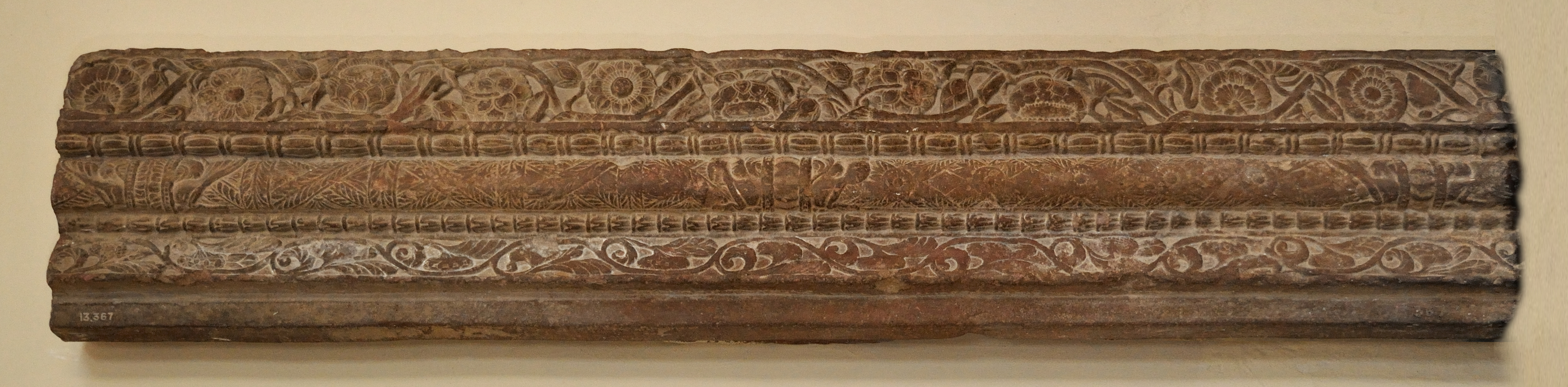
The Vasu doorjamb, dedicated to Vāsudeva "in the reign of Sodasa", Mathura, circa 15 CE. Mathura Museum, GMM 13.367

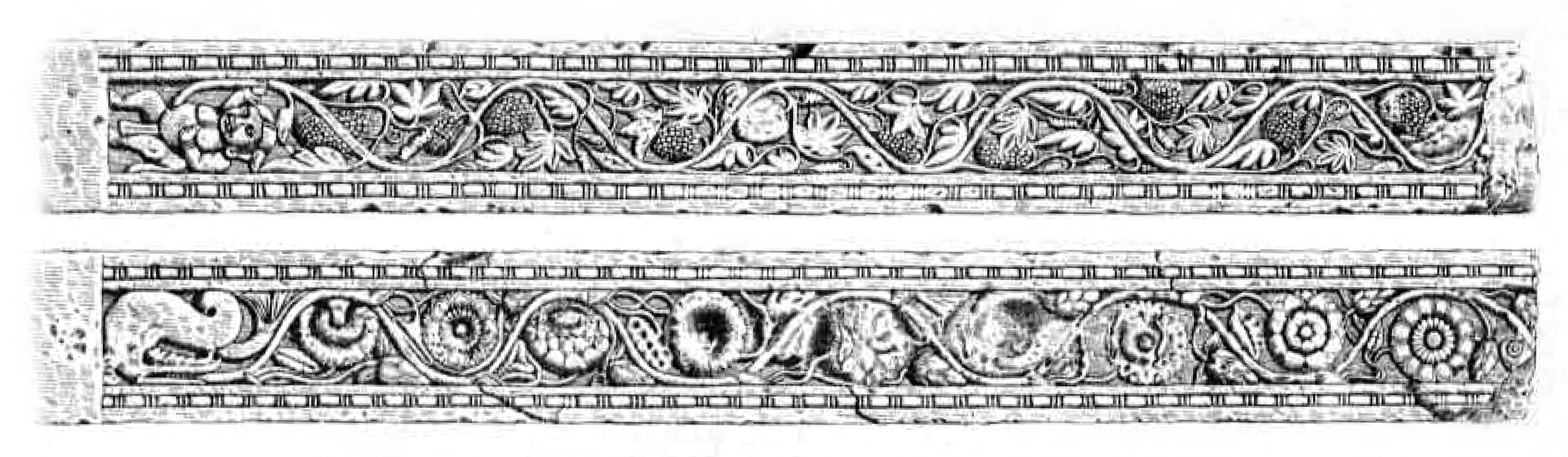
Reliefs of the Mora doorjamb with grapevine design, Mora, near Mathura, circa 15 CE. State Museum Lucknow, SML J.526. Similar scroll designs are known from Gandhara, from Pataliputra, and from Greco-Roman art.

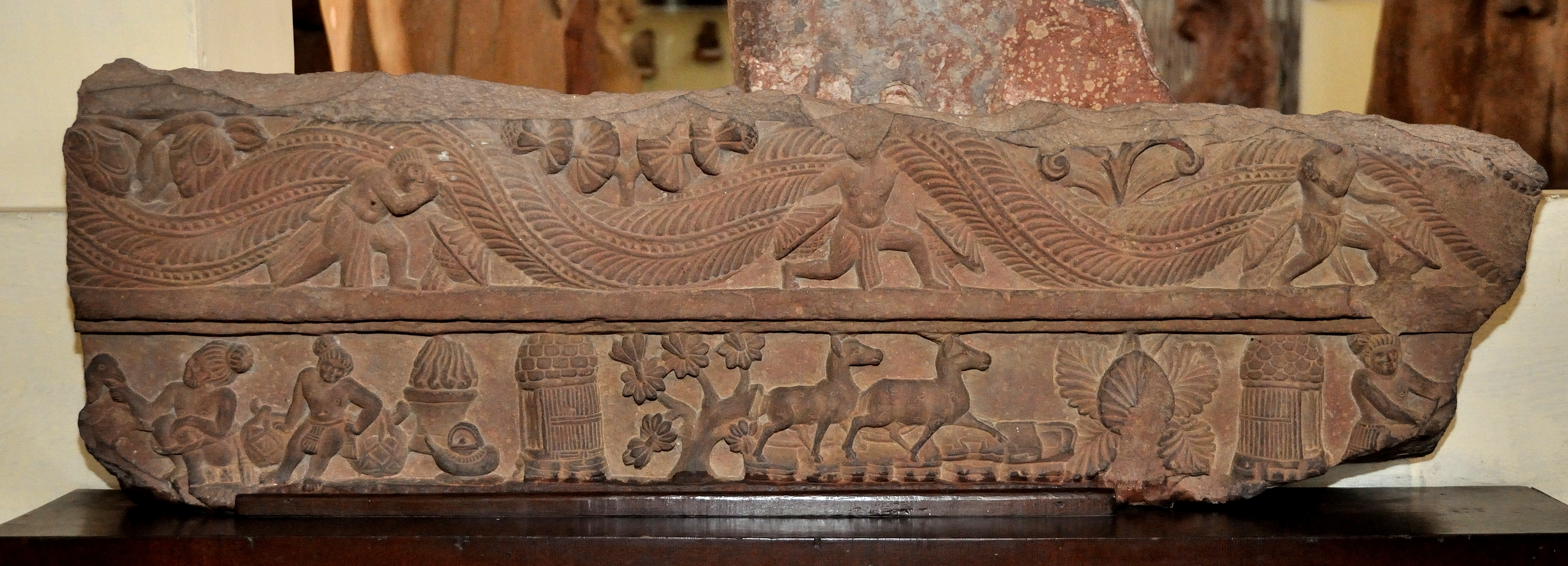
Garland bearers and Buddhist "Romaka" Jataka, in which the Buddha in a previous life was a pigeon. 25-50 CE. Similar garland-bearer designs are known from Gandhara, from Amaravati and from Greco-Roman art.

==== Calligraphy (end 1st century BCE - 1st century CE) ====
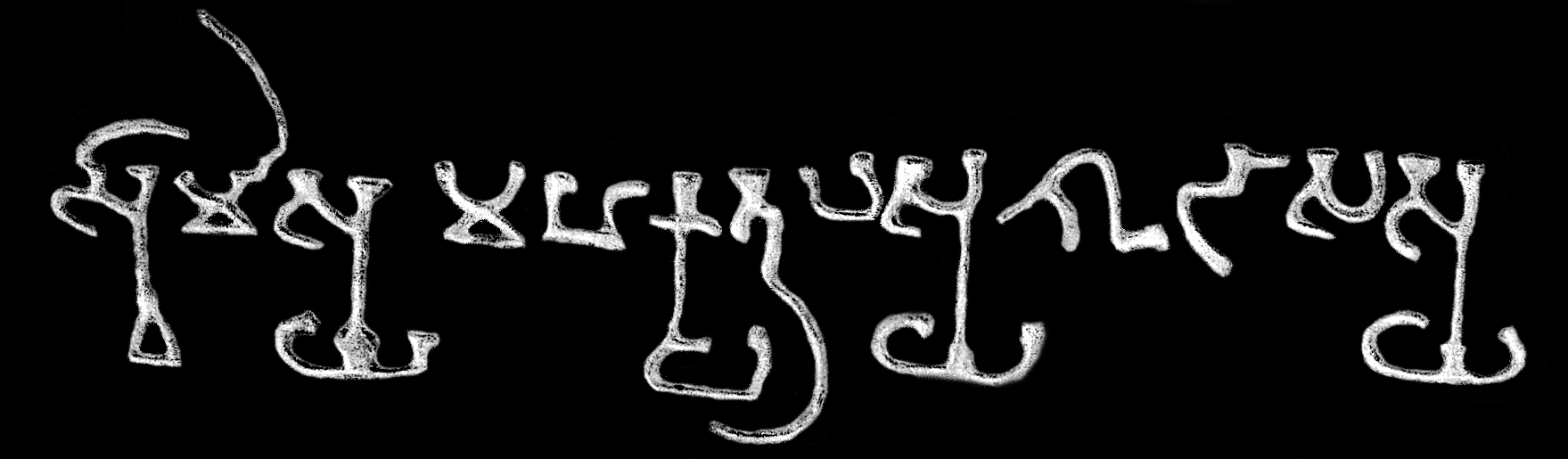
A sample of the new calligraphic style introduced by the Indo-Scythians: fragment of the Mirzapur stele inscription, in the vicinity of Mathura, circa 15 CE. Svāmisya Mahakṣatrapasya Śudasasya "Of the Lord and Great Satrap Śudāsa"

The calligraphy of the Brahmi script had remained virtually unchanged from the time of the Maurya Empire to the end of the 1st century BCE. The Indo-Scythians, following their establishment in northern India introduced "revolutionary changes" in the way Brahmi was written. In the 1st century BCE, the shape of Brahmi characters became more angular, and the vertical segments of letters were equalized, a phenomenon which is clearly visible in coin legends and made the script visually more similarly to Greek. In this new typeface, the letter were "neat and well-formed". The probable introduction of ink and pen writing, with the characteristic thickenned start of each stroke generated by the usage of ink, was reproduced in the calligraphy of stone inscriptions by the creation of a triangle-shaped form at the beginning of each stroke. This new writing style is particularly visible in the numerous dedicatory inscriptions made in Mathura, in association with devotional works of art. This new calligraphy of the Brahmi script was adopted in the rest of the subcontinent of the next half century. The "new-pen-style" initiated a rapid evolution of the script from the 1st century CE, with regional variations starting to emerge.

==== First images of the Buddha (from circa 15 CE) ====
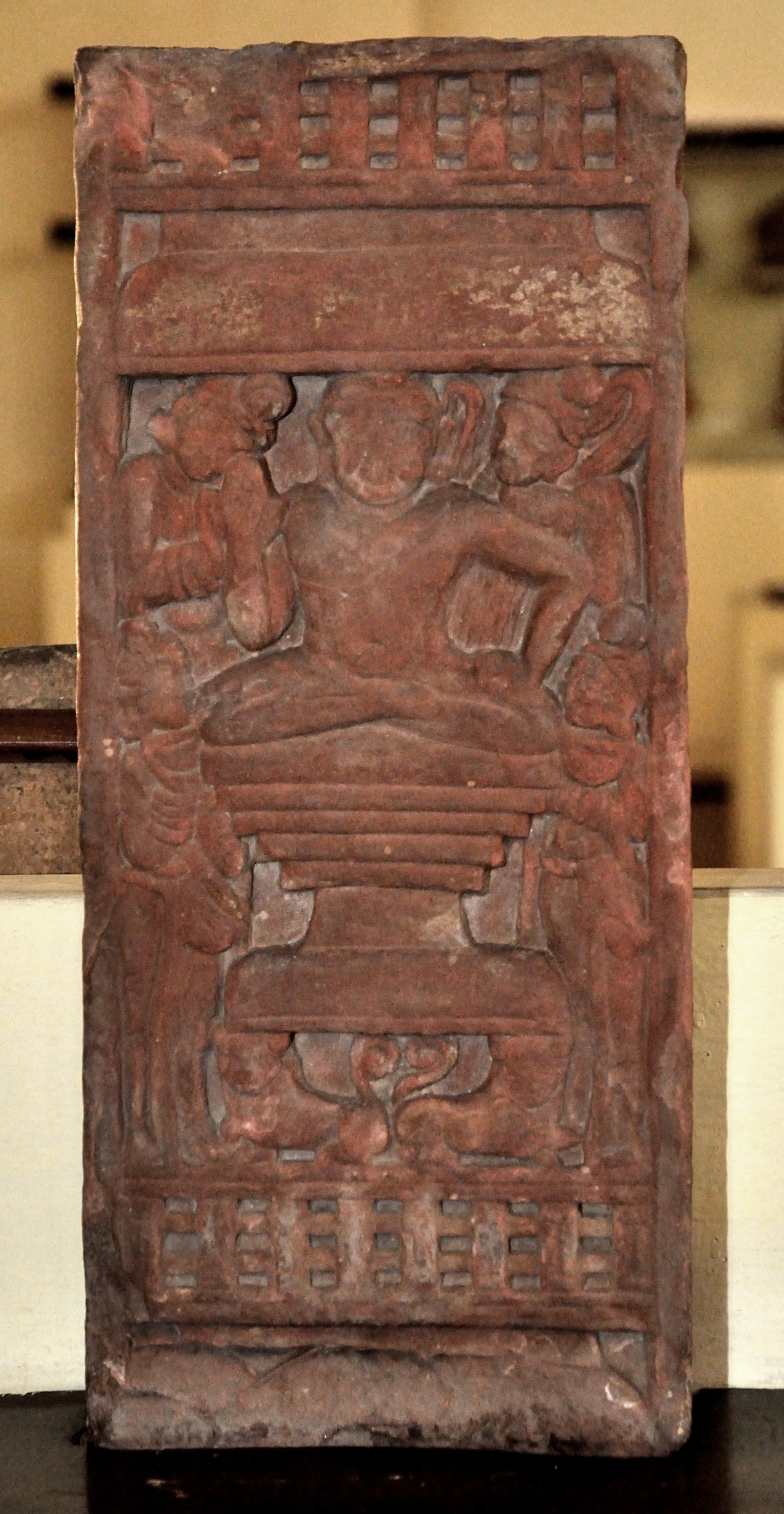
The "Isapur Buddha", probably the earliest known representation of the Buddha (possibly together with the Butkara seated Buddha statue at the Butkara Stupa, Swat), on a railing post, dated to circa 15 CE.

From around the 2nd-1st century BCE at Bharhut and Sanchi, scenes of the life of the Buddha, or sometimes of his previous lives, had been illustrated without showing the Buddha himself, except for some of his symbols such as the empty throne, or the Chankrama pathway. This artistic device ended with the sudden appearance of the Buddha, probably rather simultaneously in Gandhara and Mathura, at the turn of the millennium.

Possibly the first known representation of the Buddha (the Bimaran casket and the Tillya Tepe Buddhist coin are other candidates), the "Isapur Buddha" is also dated on stylistic grounds to the reign of Sodasa, circa 15 CE; he is shown on a relief in a canonical scene known as "Lokapalas offer Alms Bowls to the Buddha Sakyamuni". The symbolism of this early statue is still tentative, drawing heavily on the earlier, especially Jain, pictural traditions of Mathura, still far from the exuberant standardized designs of the Kushan Empire. It is rather unassuming and not yet monumental compared to the Buddha sculptures of the following century, and may represent one of the first attempts to create a human icon, marking an evolution from the splendid aniconic tradition of Buddhist art in respect to the person of the Buddha, which can be seen in the art of Sanchi and Bharhut. This depiction of the Buddha is highly similar to Jain images of the period, such as the relief of Jina Parsvanatha on an ayagapata, also dated to circa 15 CE.

It is thought that the images of Jain saints, which can be seen in Mathura from the 1st century BCE, were prototypes for the first Mathura images of the Buddha, since the attitudes are very similar, and the almost transparent very thin garment of the Buddha not much different visually from the nakedness of the Jinas. Here the Buddha is not wearing the monastic robe which would become characteristic of many of the later Buddha images. The cross-legged sitting posture may have derived from earlier reliefs of cross-legged ascetics or teachers at Bharhut, Sanchi and Bodh Gaya. It has also been suggested that the cross-legged Buddhas may have derived from the depictions of seated Scythian kings from the northwest, as visible in the coinage of Maues (90-80 BCE) or Azes (57-10 BC).

There has been a recurring debate about the exact identity of these Mathura statues, some claiming that they are only statues of Bodhisattavas, which is indeed the exact term used in most of the inscriptions of the statues found in Mathura. Only one or two statues of the Mathura type are known to mention the Buddha himself. This could be in conformity with an ancient Buddhist prohibition against showing the Buddha himself in human form, otherwise known as aniconism in Buddhism, expressed in the Sarvastivada vinaya (rules of the early Buddhist school of the Sarvastivada): ""Since it is not permitted to make an image of the Buddha's body, I pray that the Buddha will grant that I can make an image of the attendant Bodhisattva. Is that acceptable?" The Buddha answered: "You may make an image of the Bodhisattava"". However the scenes in the Isapur Buddha and the later Indrasala Buddha (dated 50-100 CE), refer to events which are considered to have happened after the Buddha's enlightenment, and therefore probably represent the Buddha rather than his younger self as a Bodhisattava, or a simple attendant Bodhisattva.

===== Other reliefs =====
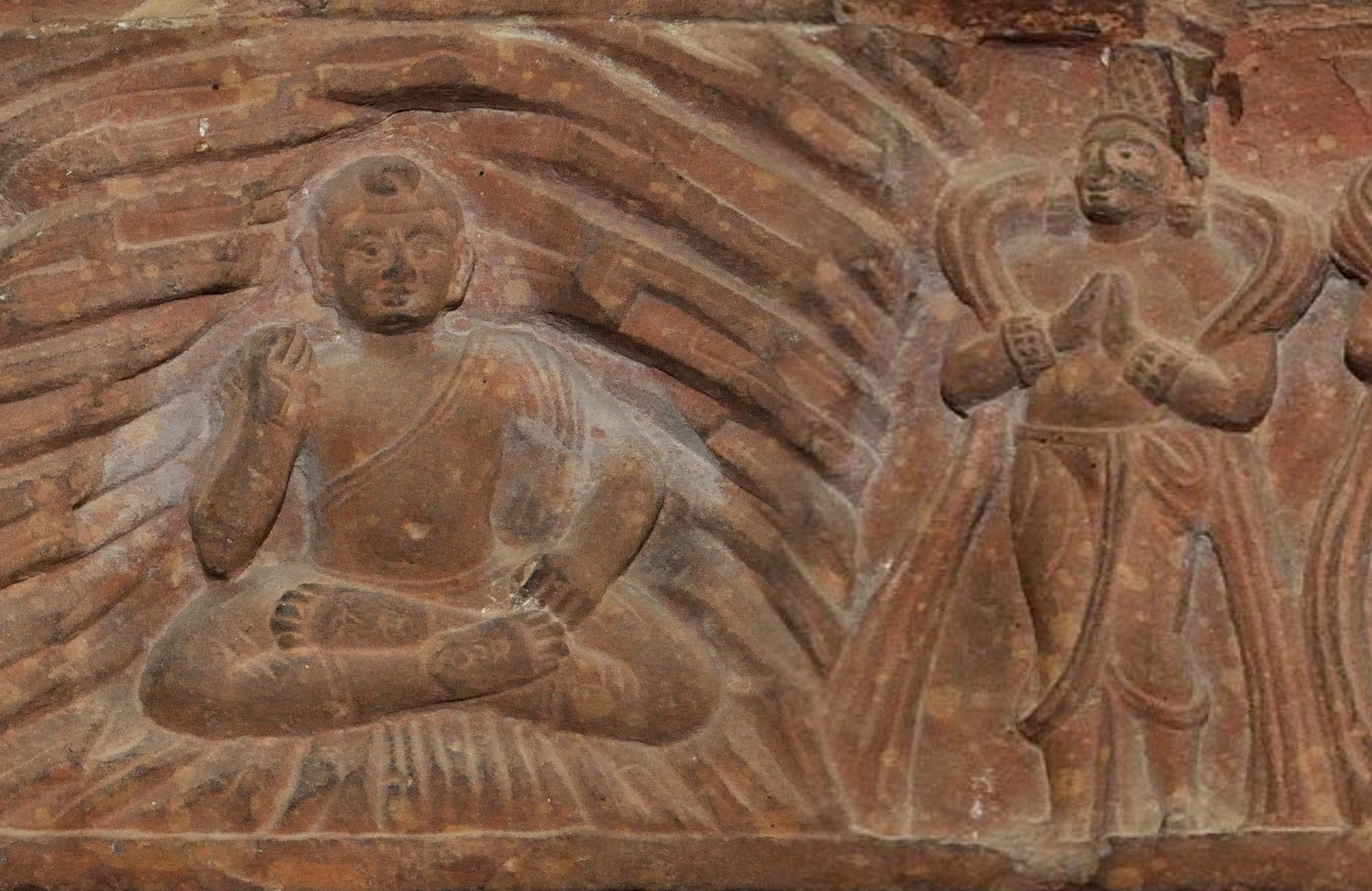
"Indrasala architrave", detail of the Buddha in Indrasala Cave, attended by the Vedic deity Indra. 50-100 CE.

The Buddhist "Indrasala architrave", dated 50-100 CE, with a scene of the Buddha at the Indrasala Cave being attended by Indra, and a scene of devotion to the Bodhi Tree on the other side, is another example of the still hesitant handling of the human icon of the Buddha in the Buddhist art of Mathura. The Buddhist character of this architrave is clearly demonstrated by the depiction of the Bodhi Tree inside its specially built temple at Bodh Gaya, a regular scene of Buddhist since the reliefs of Bharhut and Sanchi. The depiction of the Buddha in meditation in the Indrasala Cave is also characteristically Buddhist. The Buddha already has the attributes, if not the style, of the later "Kapardin" statues, except for the absence of a halo.

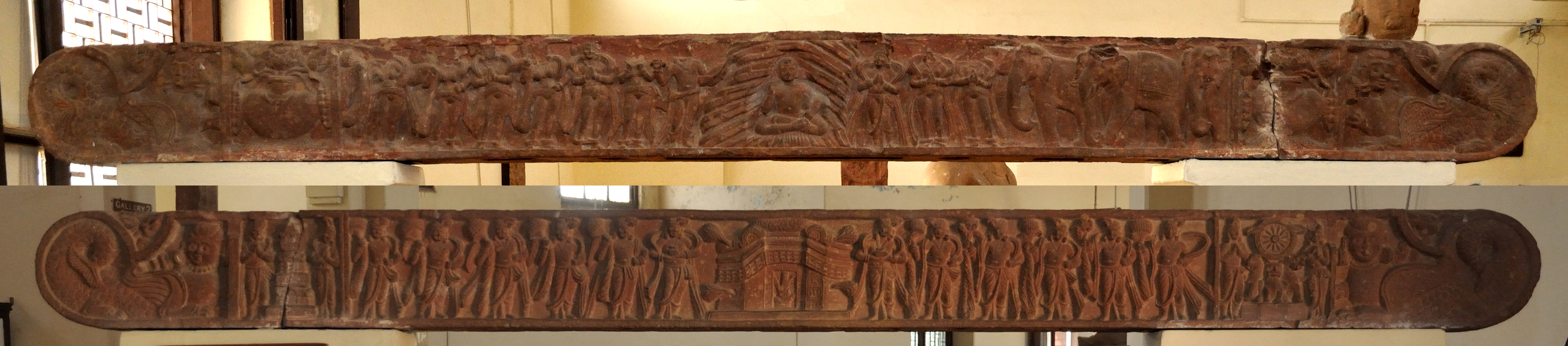
Buddhist "Indrasala architrave", with Buddha and Bodhi Tree in the center of each side, dated 50-100 CE, before the Kushan period. The Buddha is attended by Vedic deity Indra on the side of the Indrasala Cave.

===== Vedic deities =====
Besides the hero cult of the Vrishni heroes or the cross-sectarian cult of the Yakshas, Hindu art only started to develop fully from the 1st to the 2nd century CE, and there are only very few examples of artistic representation before that time. The three Vedic gods Indra, Brahma and Surya were actually first depicted in Buddhist sculpture, as attendants in scenes commemorating the life of the Buddha, even when the Buddha himself was not yet shown in human form but only through his symbols, such as the scenes of his Birth, his Descent from the Trāyastriṃśa Heaven, or his retreat in the Indrasala Cave. These Vedic deities appear in Buddhist reliefs at Mathura from around the 1st century CE, such as Indra attending the Buddha at Indrasala Cave, where Indra is shown with a mitre-like crown, and joining hands.

===== Early "Kapardin" statuary (end of 1st century CE) =====
Early "Kapardin" statuary

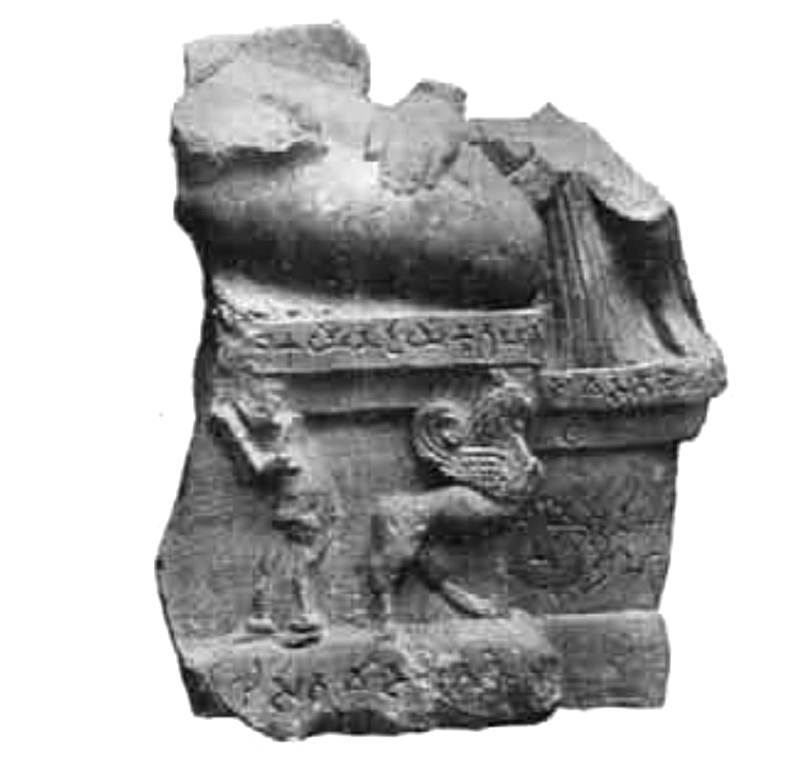
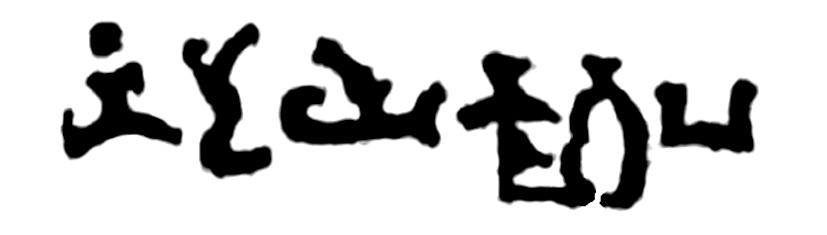
Katra fragment of a Buddha stele in the name of a "Kshatrapa lady" named Naṃda ( Naṃdaye Kshatrapa).

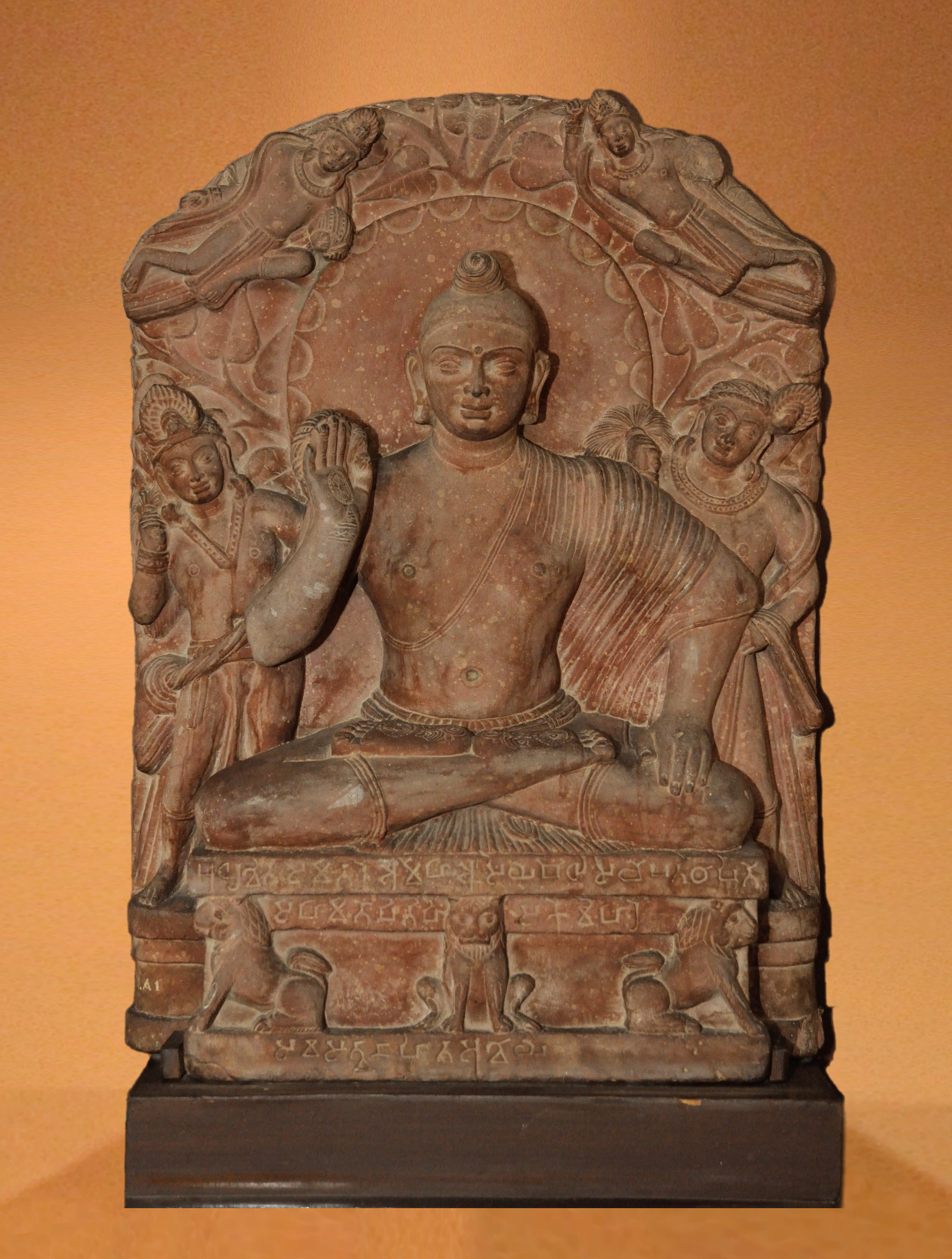
"Katra Bodhisattava stele" with inscription, dated to the Northern Satraps period.

The earliest types of "Kapardin" statuary (named after the "kapardin", the characteristic tuft of coiled hair of the Buddha) showing the Buddha with attendants are thought to be pre-Kushan, dating to the time of the "Kshatrapas" or Northern Satraps. Various broken bases of Buddha statues with inscriptions have been attributed to the Kshatrapas. A fragment of such a stele was found with the mention of the name of the donor as a "Kshatrapa lady" named Naṃda who dedicated the Bodhisattva image "for the welfare and happiness of all sentient beings for the acceptance of the Sarvastivadas", and it is considered as contemporary with the famous "Katra stele".

One of these early examples shows the Buddha being worshipped by the Gods Brahma and Indra.

The famous "Katra Bodhisattava stele" is the only fully intact image of a "Kapardin" Bodhisattva remaining from the Kshatrapa period, and is considered as the foundation type of the "Kapardin" Buddha imagery, and is the "classical statement of the type".

In conclusion, the canonical type of the seated Bodhisattva with attendants commonly known as the "Kapardin" type, seems to have developed during the time the Indo-Scythian Northern Satraps were still ruling in Mathura, before the arrival of the Kushans. This type continued during the Kushan period, down to the time of Huvishka, before being overtaken by fully-dressed types of Buddha statuary depicting the Buddha wearing the monastic coat "Samghati".

== Rulers ==
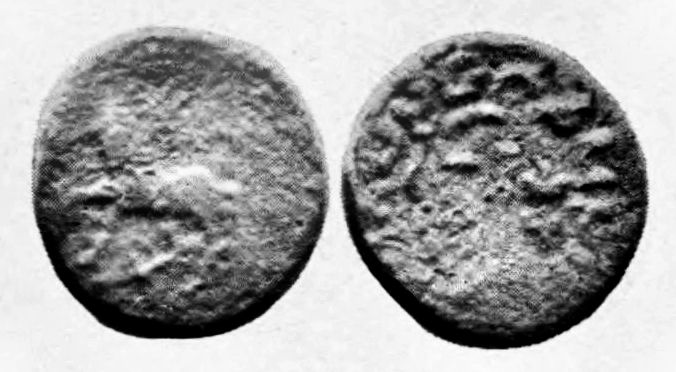
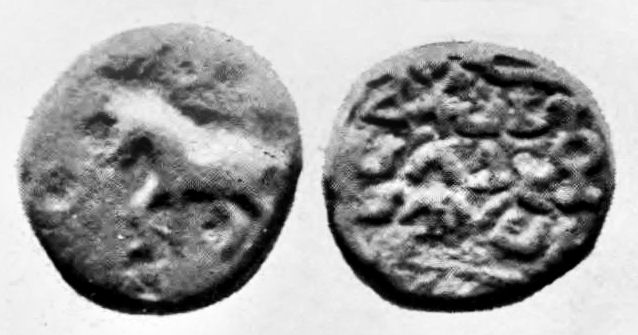
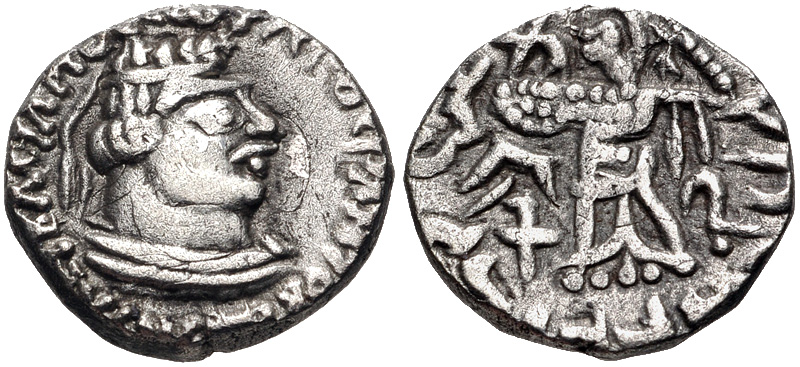
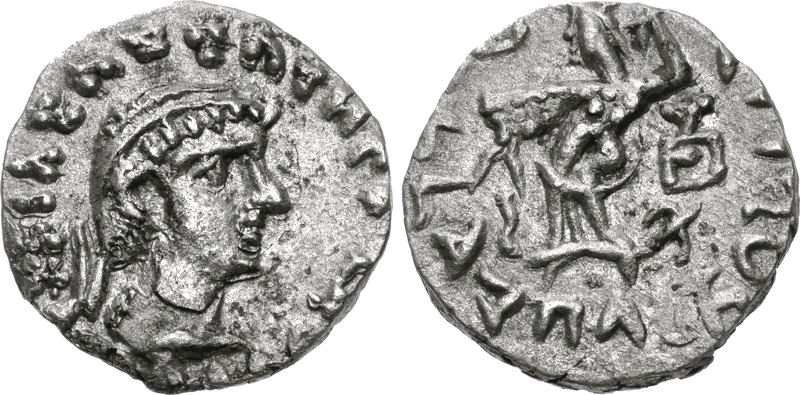
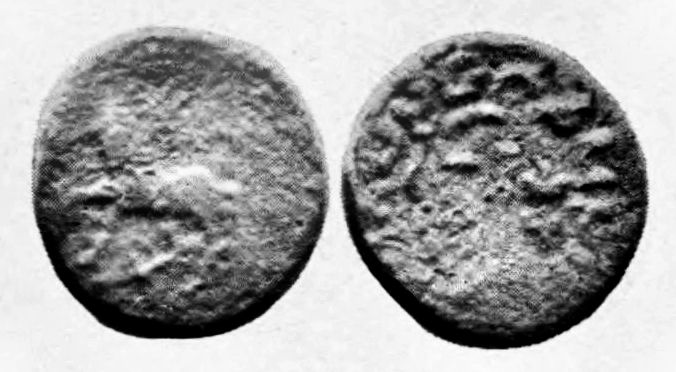
Ruler	Image	Title	Approx. dates	Mentions
Hagamasha		Satrap	1st century BCE	In the archaeological excavations of Sonkh, near Mathura, the earliest coins of the Kshatrapa levels were those of Hagamasha.
Hagana		Satrap	1st century BCE
Rajuvula		Great Satrap	early 1st century BCE
Bhadayasa		Satrap	1st century CE	Possible successor of Rajuvula in Eastern Punjab
Sodasa		Satrap	1st century CE	Son of Rajuvula in Mathura
Kharapallana	Ksatrapena Vanasparena Kharapallanena	Great Satrap	c. CE 130	Great Satrap for Kushan ruler Kanishka I
Vanaspara	Ksatrapena Vanasparena Kharapallanena	Satrap	c. CE 130	Satrap for Kushan ruler Kanishka I

== Coinage ==
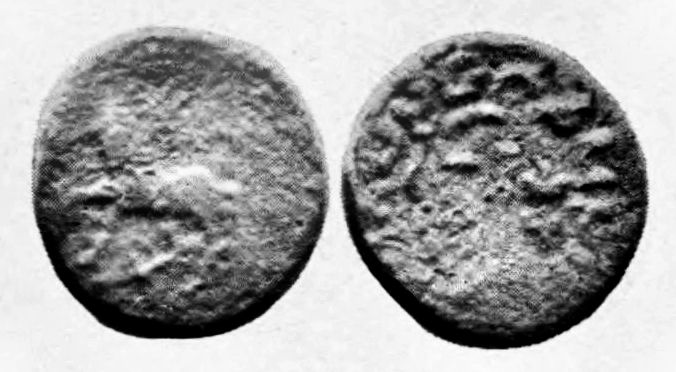
Coin of satrap Hagamasha. Obv. Horse to the left. Rev. Standing figure with symbols, legend Khatapasa Hagāmashasa. 1st century BCE.

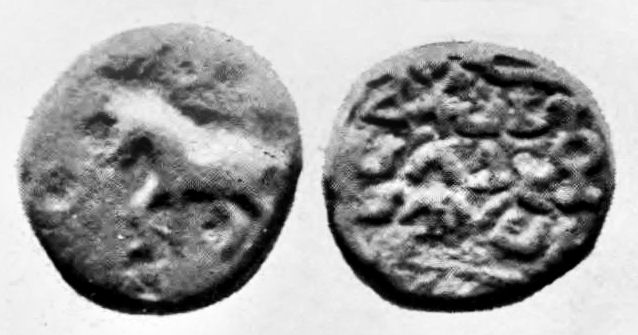
Joint coin of Hagana and Hagamasha. Obv.: Horse to left. Rev. Thunderbolt, legend Khatapāna Hagānasa Hagāmashasa. 1st century BCE.

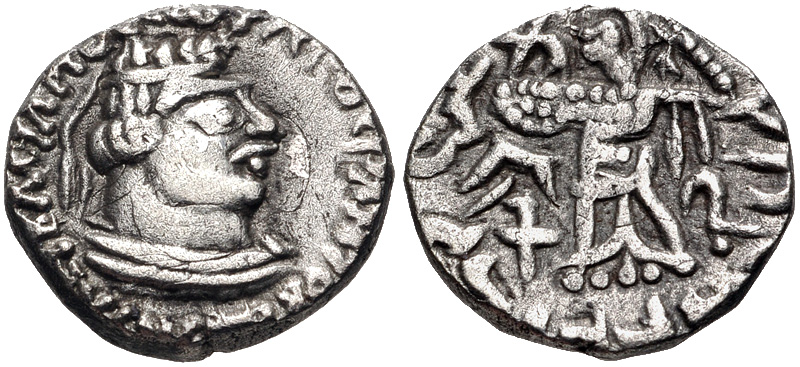
Coin of Rajuvula, c. 10 CE

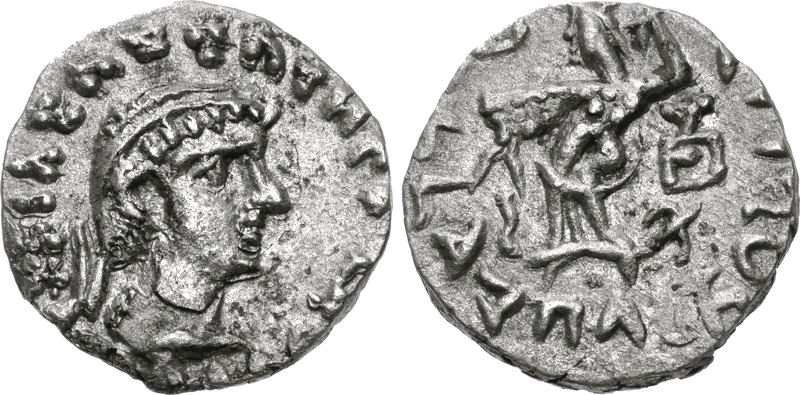
Coin of Bhadrayasha, early 1st century CE

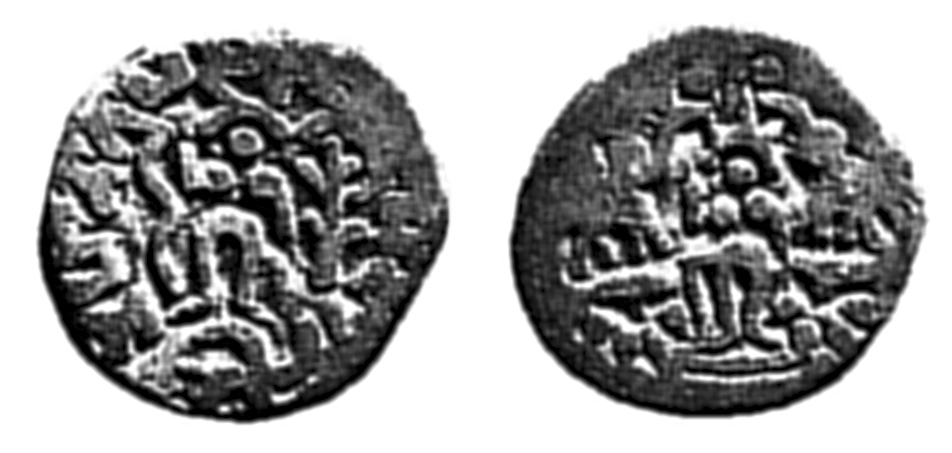
Coin of Sodasa, early 1st century CE

== See also ==
- Indo-Scythians
- Western Satraps
- List of Indo-Scythian dynasties and rulers

Territories/ dates	Western India	Western Pakistan Balochistan	Paropamisadae Arachosia	Bajaur	Gandhara	Western Punjab	Eastern Punjab	Mathura
			INDO-GREEK KINGDOM					
90–85 BCE			Nicias	Menander II		Artemidoros		
90–70 BCE			Hermaeus	Archebius				
85-60 BCE			INDO-SCYTHIAN KINGDOM; Maues					
75–70 BCE			Vonones; Spalahores	Telephos		Apollodotus II		
65–55 BCE			Spalirises; Spalagadames			Hippostratos	Dionysios	
55–35 BCE			Azes I				Zoilos II	
55–35 BCE			Azilises; Azes II				Apollophanes	Indo-Scythian dynasty of the NORTHERN SATRAPS; Hagamasha
25 BCE – 10 CE				Indo-Scythian dynasty of the APRACHARAJAS; Vijayamitra (ruled 12 BCE - 15 CE) (Note: From the dated inscription on the Rukhana reliquary)	Liaka Kusulaka; Patika Kusulaka; Zeionises	Kharahostes (ruled 10 BCE– 10 CE) (Note: An Inscribed Silver Buddhist Reliquary of the Time of King Kharaosta and Prince Indravarman, Richard Salomon, Journal of the American Oriental Society, Vol. 116, No. 3 (Jul. - Sep., 1996), pp. 442); Mujatria	Strato II and Strato III	Hagana
10-20 CE		INDO-PARTHIAN KINGDOM; Gondophares		Indravasu	INDO-PARTHIAN KINGDOM; Gondophares		Rajuvula	
20-30 CE			Ubouzanes; Pakores	Vispavarma (ruled c.0-20 CE) (Note: A Kharosthī Reliquary Inscription of the Time of the Apraca Prince Visnuvarma, by Richard Salomon, South Asian Studies 11 1995, Pages 27-32, Published online: 09 Aug 2010)	Sarpedones		Bhadayasa	Sodasa
30-40 CE			KUSHAN EMPIRE; Kujula Kadphises	Indravarma	Abdagases		...	...
40-45 CE				Aspavarma	Gadana		...	...
45-50 CE				Sasan	Sases		...	...
50-75 CE							...	...
75-100 CE	Indo-Scythian dynasty of the WESTERN SATRAPS; Chastana		Vima Takto				...	...
100-120 CE	Abhiraka		Vima Kadphises				...	...
120 CE	Bhumaka; Nahapana	PARATARAJAS; Yolamira	Kanishka I				Great Satrap Kharapallana and Satrap Vanaspara for Kanishka I	
130-230 CE	Jayadaman; Rudradaman I Damajadasri I Jivadaman; Rudrasimha I Satyadaman; Jivadaman; Rudrasena I	Bagamira; Arjuna; Hvaramira; Mirahvara	Vāsishka (c. 140 – c. 160); Huvishka (c. 160 – c. 190); Vasudeva I (c. 190 – to at least 230)					
230-280 CE	Samghadaman; Damasena; Damajadasri II; Viradaman; Isvaradatta; Yasodaman I Vijayasena; Damajadasri III; Rudrasena II; Visvasimha	Miratakhma; Kozana; Bhimarjuna; Koziya; Datarvharna; Datarvharna	INDO-SASANIANS; Ardashir I, Sassanid king and "Kushanshah" (c. 230 – 250); Peroz I, "Kushanshah" (c. 250 – 265); Hormizd I, "Kushanshah" (c. 265 – 295)			Kanishka II (c. 230 – 240); Vashishka (c. 240 – 250); Kanishka III (c. 250 – 275)		
280-300 CE	Bhratadarman	Datayola II	Hormizd II, "Kushanshah" (c. 295 – 300)			Vasudeva II (c. 275 – 310)		
300-320 CE	Visvasena; Rudrasimha II; Jivadaman		Peroz II, "Kushanshah" (c. 300 – 325)			Vasudeva III; Vasudeva IV; Vasudeva V Chhu (c. 310? – 325)		
320-388 CE	Yasodaman II; Rudradaman II; Rudrasena III; Simhasena; Rudrasena IV		Shapur II Sassanid king and "Kushanshah" (c. 325); Varhran I, Varhran II, Varhran III "Kushanshahs" (c. 325 – 350); Peroz III "Kushanshah" (c. 350 –360); HEPHTHALITE/ HUNAS invasions			Shaka I (c. 325 – 345); Kipunada (c. 345 – 375)		GUPTA EMPIRE; Chandragupta I Samudragupta
388-395 CE	Rudrasimha III		Chandragupta II					
