= Vrishni heroes =

Ancient Indian legendary heroes

Vrishni heroes

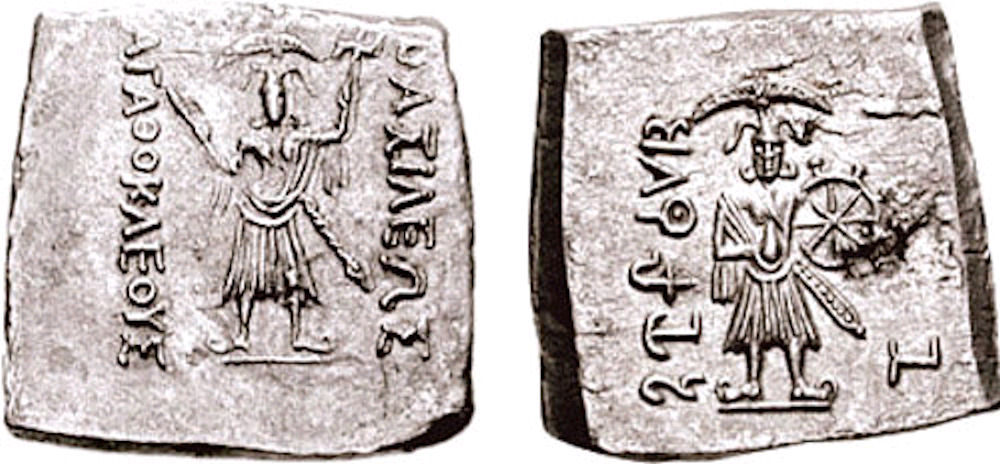
Vrishni heroes on the coinage of Agathocles of Bactria, circa 190-180 BCE: Samkarshana, with Gada mace and plow, and Vāsudeva, with Shankha (a pear-shaped case or conch) and Chakra wheel. This is "the earliest unambiguous image" of the two deities. Another variation .

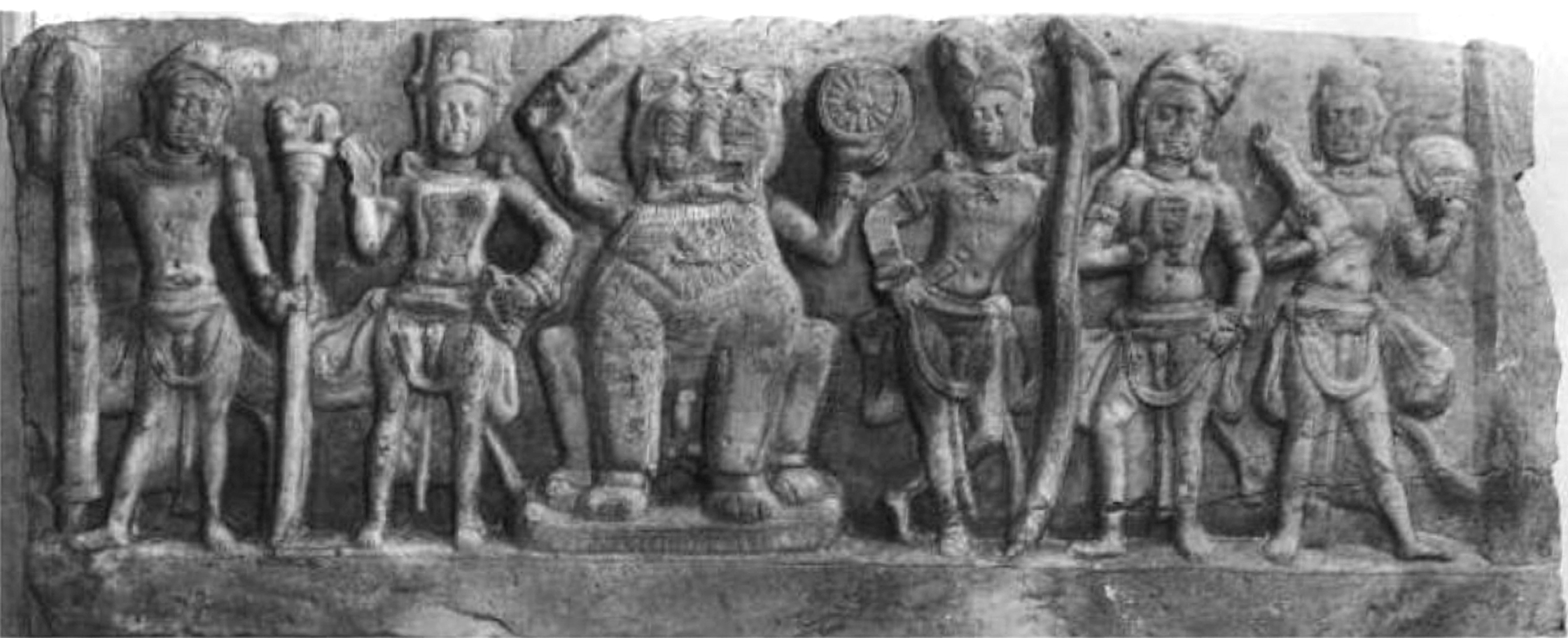
The five Vrishni heroes Saṃkarṣaṇa, Vāsudeva, Pradyumna, Samba, Aniruddha standing around enthroned Narasimha. Kondamotu Vrishni heroes relief, 4th century CE, Hyderabad State Museum. The Vrishni heroes remained major divinities until the 5th century CE, when they lost preeminence to Vishnu.

The Vrishni heroes (IAST: Vṛṣṇi vīras), also referred to as Pancha-viras (IAST: Pañca vīras; 'the five heroes'), are a group of five legendary, potentially semi-historical deified heroes who are found in the literature and archaeological sites of ancient India. Their earliest worship is attestable in the clan of the Vrishnis near Mathura by 4th-century BCE. Legends are associated with these deified heroes, some of which may be based on real, historical heroes of the Vrishni clan. Their early worship has been variously described as cross-sectarian, much like the cult of the Yakshas, related to the early Bhagavata tradition of Hinduism, and with possible links to Jainism as well. They and their legends – particularly of Krishna and Balarama – have been an important part of the Vaishnava tradition of Hinduism.

The Vrishnis were already known in the late Vedic literature. They are also mentioned by Pāṇini in Astadhyayi verse 6.2.34, while Krishna is referred to as Krishna Varshneya ("the Vrishni") in verse 3.187.51 of the Mahabharata. Beyond texts, their importance in ancient India is attested by the ancient inscriptions found near Mathura and coins discovered in the ruins of Ai-Khanoum (Afghanistan), bearing images of the two main Vrishni heroes, with Greek and Brahmi legends.

The cult of the Vrishni heroes existed as an independent cult in Mathura, as suggested by the Mora Well Inscription, and was then later gradually amalgamated into Vaishnavism. The deification of the Vrishni heroes centered around the cult of Vasudeva-Krishna, known as Bhagavatism. Epigraphical evidence suggests that their legends and worship swiftly expanded to other parts of India by the start of the common era.

The Vrishni heroes are generally identified as Samkarshana (Balarama, son of Vasudeva Anakadundubhi and Devaki), Vāsudeva (Krishna, another son of Vasudeva Anakadundubhi and Devaki), Pradyumna (son of Vāsudeva and Rukmini), Samba (son of Vāsudeva and Jambavati), and Aniruddha (son of Pradyumna and Mayavati).

Probably as late as the 1st century CE, the cult of the Vrishni heroes (Vīravāda) retained more importance than the Vyuha doctrine (Vyūhavāda), the subsequent cult of emanations that evolved from the Vrishni hero cult. Still later, it evolved into the Avatāravāda system of incarnations of Vishnu. Overall, according to Doris Srinivasan, "the absorption of the Vrishni hero into the Vaishnava worship is very gradual. The amalgamation process was preceded and concurrent with a cult of several Vrishni heroes".

The Vrishni heroes also have distinct individual qualities: Vāsudeva is also associated with gentleness and strength, Samkarsana with knowledge, Pradyumna with female power, Samba with male power and Aniruddha with ferociousness and sovereignty.

== Identity ==
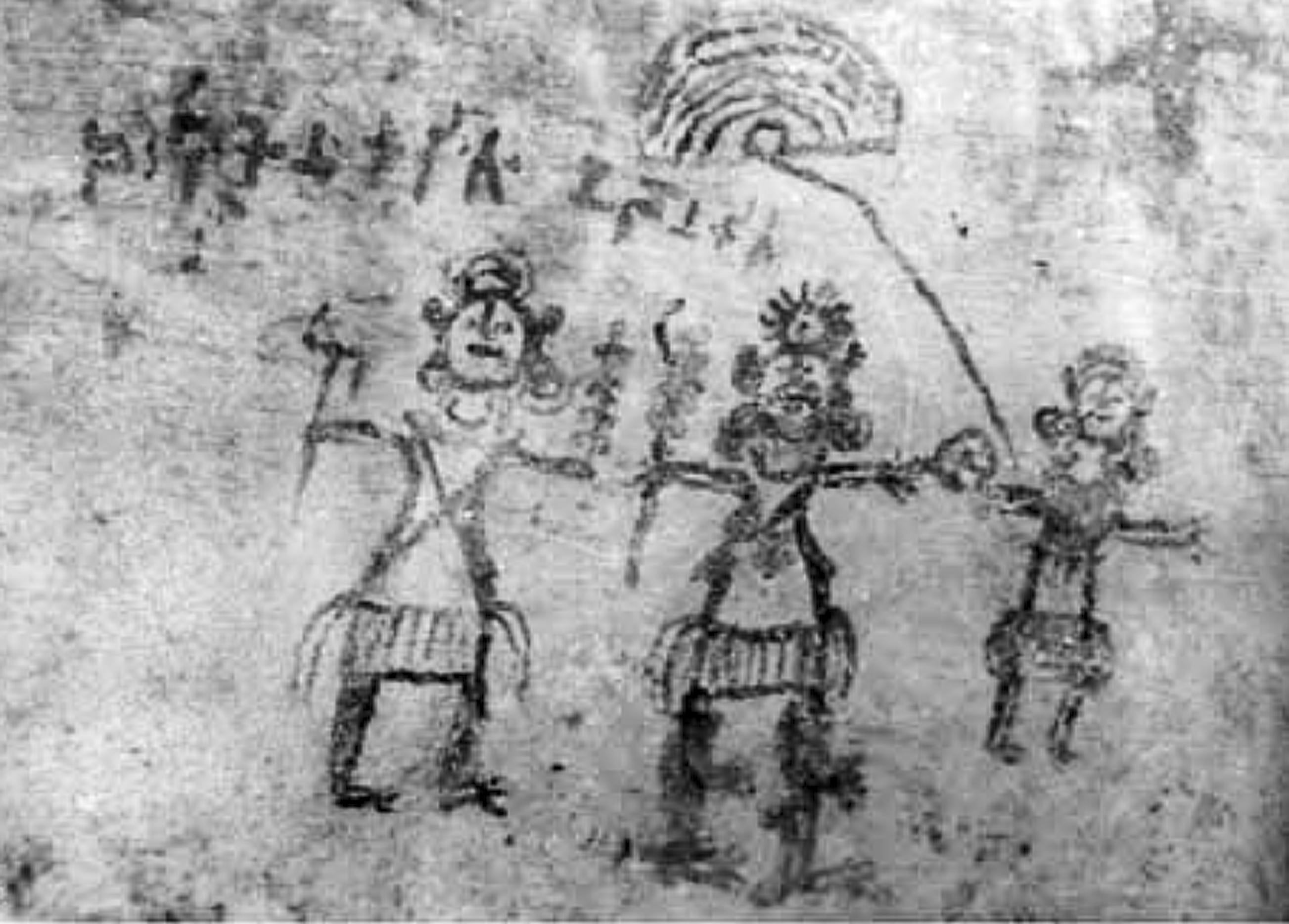
Vrishni triad shown in a rock painting at Tikla, Madhya Pradesh, 3rd-2nd century BCE. These would be Saṃkarṣaṇa (with plough and mace), Vāsudeva (with mace and wheel) and a female deity, probably Ekanamsha.

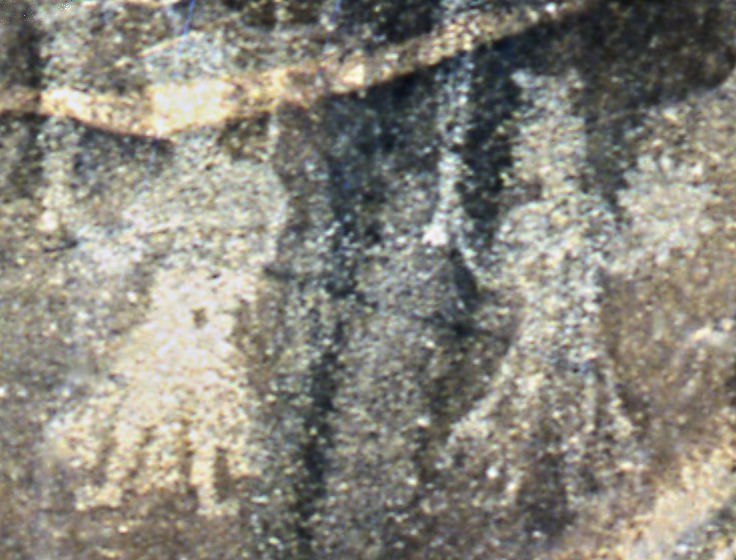
(Bala)rama and Krishna at Chilas. The Kharoshthi inscription nearby reads Rama [kri]ṣa. 1st century CE.

The historical roots and the identity of the Vrishni heroes are unclear. Several interpretations have been proposed.

=== Local heroes turned deities ===
According to Rosenfield, the five heroes of the Vrishnis may have been ancient historical rulers in the region of Mathura, and Vāsudeva and Krishna "may well have been kings of this dynasty as well". According to the Vayu Purana (97.1-2), the five Vrishni heroes were originally human, and their names were Samkarshana, Vāsudeva, Pradyumna, Samba, and Aniruddha.

The heroes would then have evolved into Vaishnavite deities through a step-by-step process: 1) deification of the Vrishni heroes 2) association with the God Narayana-Vishnu 3) incorporation into the Vyuha concept of successive emanations of the God. Epigraphically, the deified status of Vāsudeva in particular is confirmed by his appearance on the coinage of Agathocles of Bactria (190-180 BCE) and by the devotional character of the Heliodorus pillar inscription (circa 110 BCE). Later, the association with Narayana (Vishnu) is suggested by the Hathibada Ghosundi Inscriptions of the 1st century BCE. It is generally thought that "by the beginning of the Christian era, the cult of Vasudeva, Vishnu and Narayana amalgamated". By the 2nd century CE, the "avatara concept was in its infancy", and the depiction of Vishnu with his four emanations (the Chatur-vyūha), consisting of the Vrishni heroes minus Samba, starts to become visible in art at the end of the Kushan period.

Banerjee too considered that they may have been semi-deified legendary kings who came to be considered as Vishnu's avatars. This would lead to an early form of Vaishnavism, currently described as the Pancaratra system. Also according to Gavin Flood – an Indologist and scholar of Hinduism, Vāsudeva may have originated in a real Vrishni hero or king, but the lineage is difficult to establish. This Vasudeva became deified in the Vrishni clan, its worship being traceable to the 4th century text of Pāṇini, which mentions Vāsudevaka or a "devotee of Vāsudeva". Vāsudeva then fused with Krishna of the Yadavas clan. Over time, Vāsudeva was identified with Krishna and Vishnu.

According to Christopher Austin, the Vrishni heroes are characters linked to the end of the Mahabharata, reflecting the three generations of Vrishnis of Krishna from the Bhagavad Gita fame, his son, his grandson along with the Balarama (Samkarshana). This view is supported by Srinivasan and Banerjee based on evidence in two Puranic passages and the Mora well inscription. In early Hinduism, the five Vrishni heroes have been identified as Vāsudeva-Krishna, Samkarsana-Balarama, Pradyumna, Aniruddha and Samba as known from the Medieval Vayu Purana.

=== Early coinage (3rd-2nd century BCE) ===
The Vrishni heroes appear on the coinage of Agathocles of Bactria, circa 190-180 BCE: Samkarshana, with Gada mace and plow, and Vāsudeva, with Panchajanya (a pear-shaped case or conch) and Sudarshana Chakra wheel. This is "the earliest unambiguous image" of the two deities.

On some of the Indian punch-marked coins, three individuals appear without attributes, possibly deities Saṃkarṣaṇa, Vāsudeva and Ekanamsha in the late 4th-2nd century BCE. The same type of coins was excavated in Besnagar.

On some post-Mauryan punch-marked coins, possible depictions of Saṃkarṣaṇa-Balarama appear. He is shown wielding a mace and a plough. These punch-marked coins are dated to the 2nd century BCE, and may be associated with Mathura.

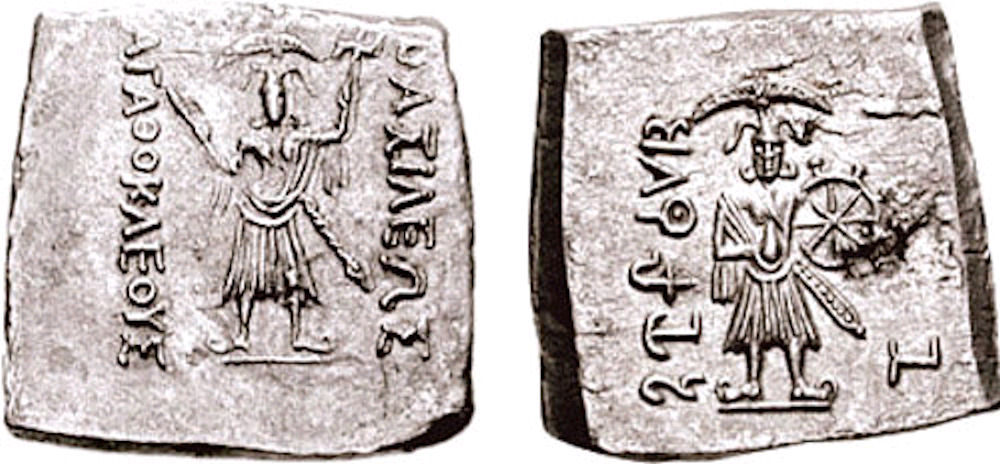
Coin of Agathocles of Bactria (190-180 BCE)

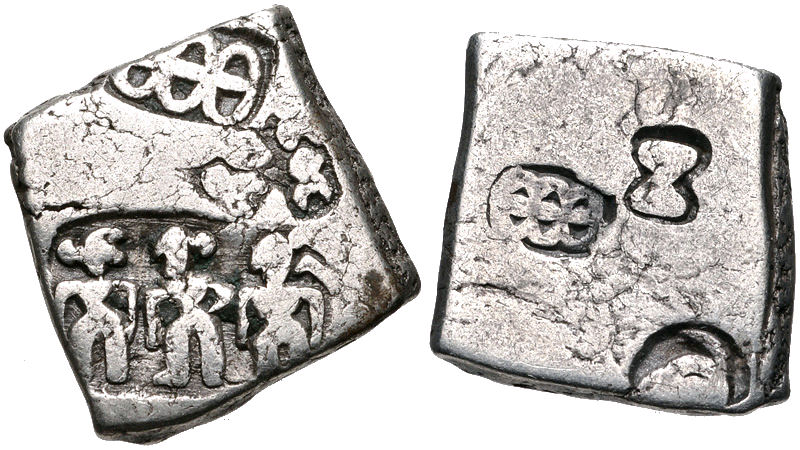
Mauryan Empire. Late 4th-2nd century BC

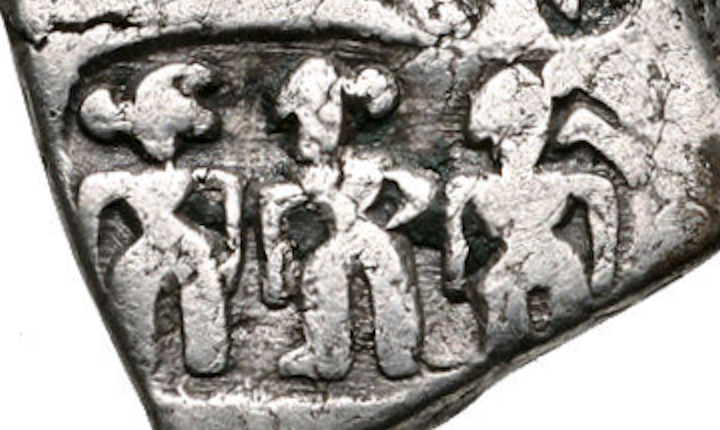
Mauryan punch-marked coin with three deities 4th-2nd century BCE

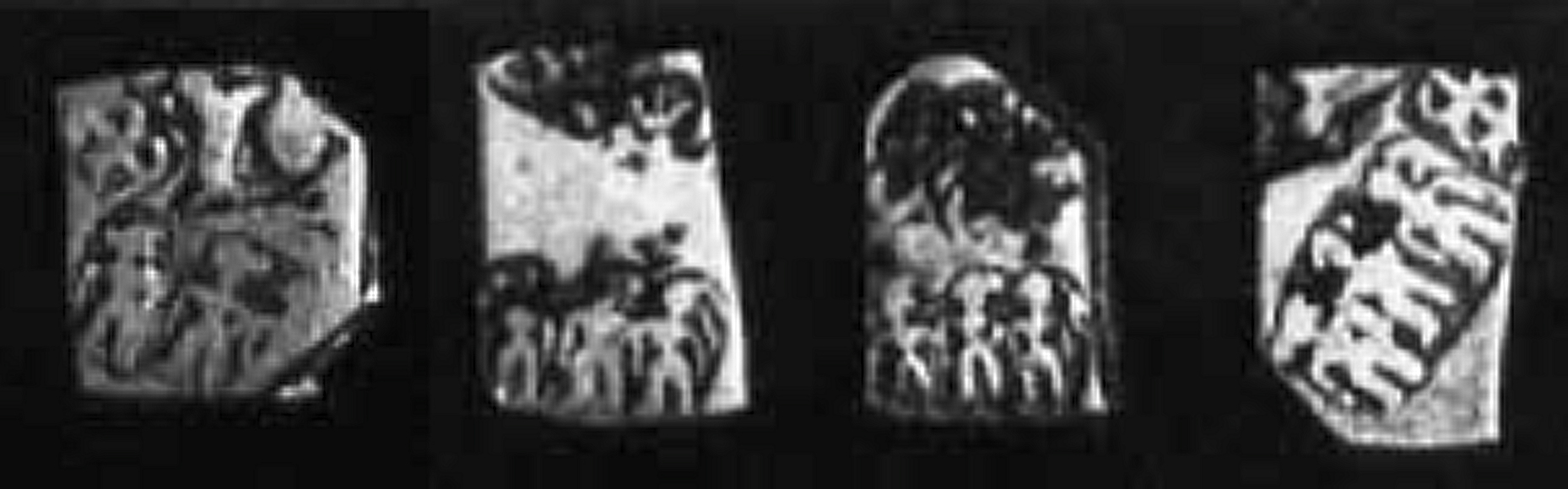
Punch-marked coins excavated in Besnagar

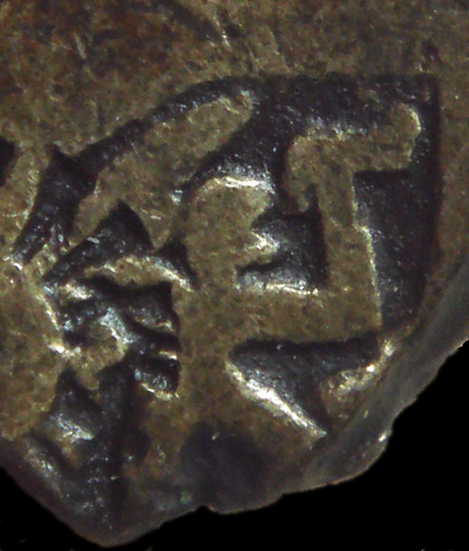
Post-Mauryan punch-marked coin with possible Balarama (detail)

=== Jainism ===
Another theory has been proposed by Heinrich Luders. Based on an analysis of 10th- to 12th-century Jaina texts, Luders proposed that Vrishnis may have roots in Jainism, noting the co-existence of the Jain and Vrishni-related archaeological findings in Mathura, and the strength of Jainism at that time in Mathura. He names the Vrishni heroes as Baladeva, Akrura, Anadhrsti, Sarana and Viduratha – all Jain heroes and with Akrura as the commander.

=== Cross-sectarian deities ===
According to Quintanilla, the cult of the Vrishnis may have been cross-sectarian, much like the cult of the Yakshas, and "may not necessarily represent the roots of Vaiṣṇava theology at Mathura".

== Devotional structures and symbolism (circa 115 BCE) ==
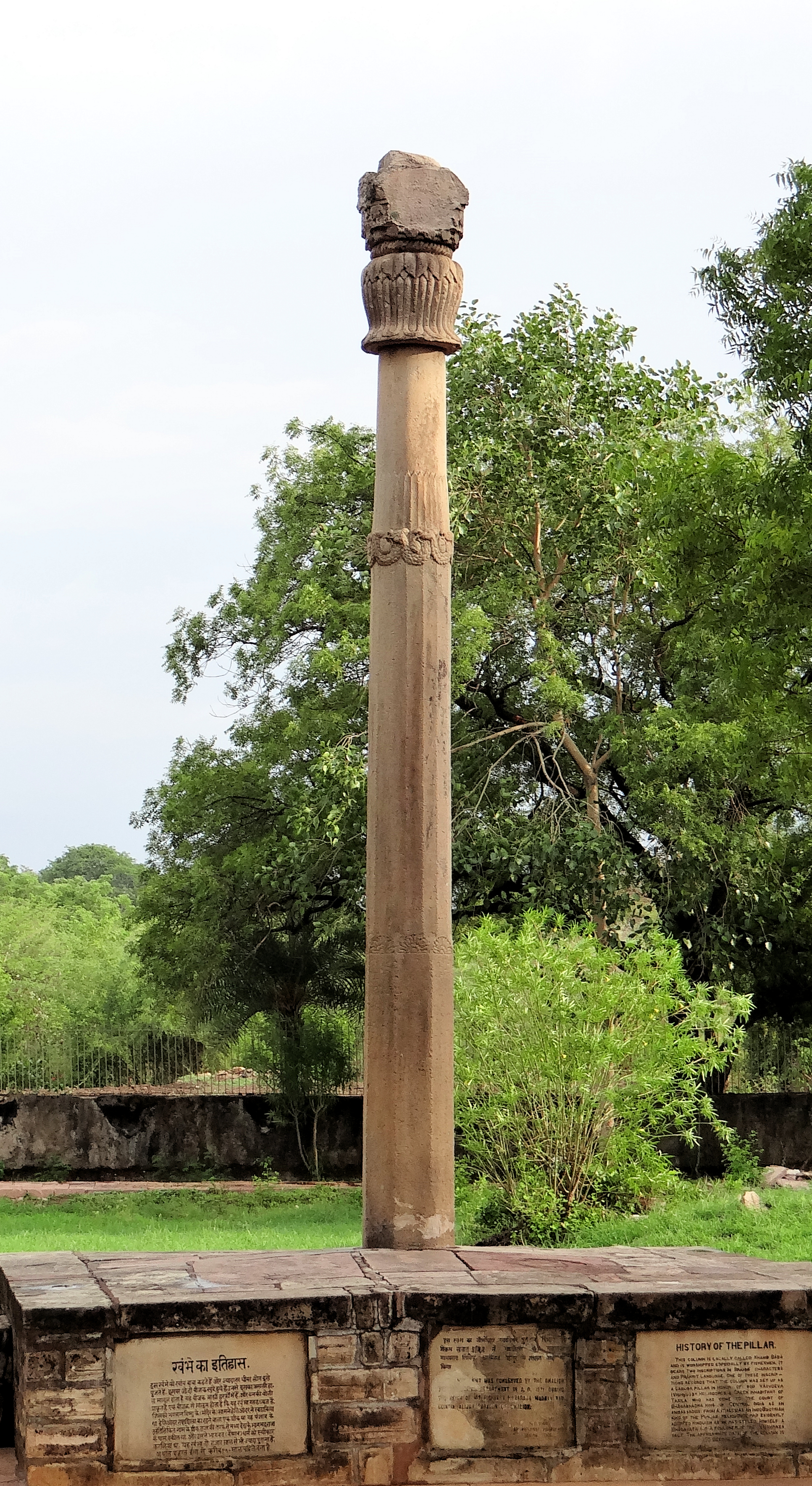
The Heliodorus pillar was erected to Vāsudeva by the Greek Heliodorus in 115 BCE. It was crowned by a Garuda capital.

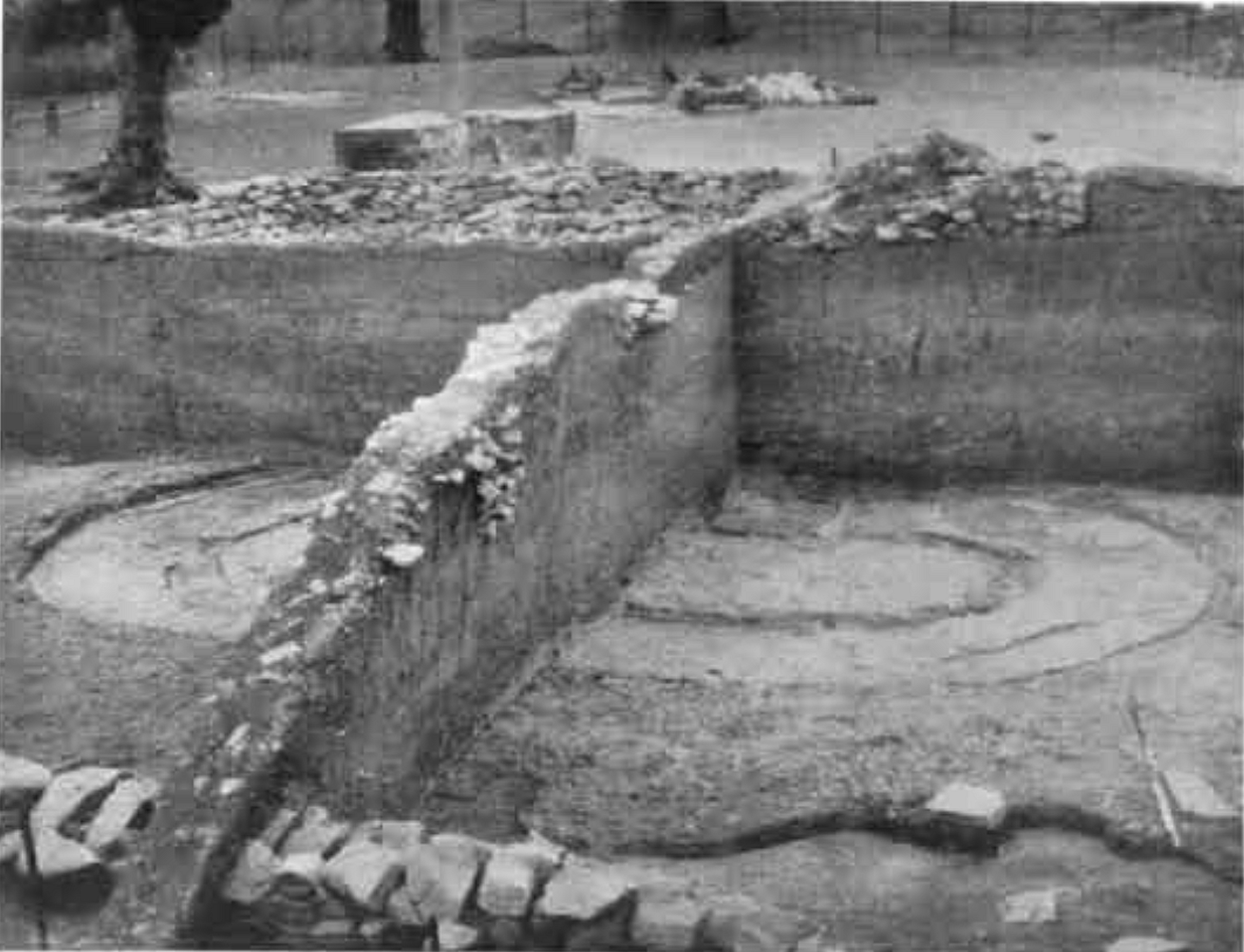
Excavation of the Vrishni Temple, with elliptic plan. The Heliodorus pillar appears in the immediate background.

Several pillar capitals with symbolic statuary associated with the Vhrishni heroes have been found in Besnagar around the site of the Heliodorus pillar, dated to about 115 BCE.

The Heliodorus pillar inscription explains that the pillar erected to honour Vāsudeva is a Garuda-vajra, although the Garuda statue has not been found. According to Susan L. Huntington, the Garuda capital on the Heliodorus pillar was probably similar to a portable Garuda standard illustrated on one of the nearly contemporary reliefs at Bharhut. In Bharhut, a man riding a horse is seen holding a portable pillar-standard, crowned by a bird-man creature similar to a Kinnara. The same concept of Garuda pillar may have been adopted for the Heliodorus pillar.

Other sculptures and pillar capitals were found near the Heliodorus pillar, and it is thought they were dedicated to Vāsudeva's kinsmen, otherwise known as the Vrishni heroes and objects of the Bhagavata cult. These are a tala (fan-palm capital), a makara (crocodile) capital, a banyan-tree capital, and a possible statue of the goddess Lakshmi, also associated with the Bhagavat cult. Just as Garuda is associated with Vāsudesa, the fan-palm capital is generally associated with Saṃkarṣaṇa, and the makara is associated with Pradyumna. The banyan-tree capital with ashtanidhis is associated with Lakshmi. In effect, the findings surrounding the Heliodorus pillar suggest the cult of a trio of the Vrishni heroes in this time and area, composed of the three deities Vāsudesa, Saṃkarṣaṇa and Pradyumna.

=== Vrishni Temple structure ===
Excavations suggests that these various pillars with their symbolic capitals were standing in line at the site, and that the Heliodorus pillar was just one of them, standing at the end of the line. Although the pillars are aniconic, it is probable that now lost sculptures representing the deities, broadly similar to the depictions on Vāsudeva and Samkarshana on the coins of Agathocles of Bactria (190-180 BCE), were located in adjoining shrines.

The 1963–65 excavations at the site suggest that the site had an elliptical shrine – possibly dating to the 4th to 3rd-century BCE – with a brick foundation and likely a wooden superstructure. This was destroyed by a flood around 200 BCE. New soil was then added and the ground level raised to build a new second temple to Vāsudeva, with a wooden pillar (Garuda Dhvaja) in front of the east-facing elliptical shrine. This too was destroyed by floods sometime in the 2nd-century BCE. In late 2nd-century BCE, after some ground preparation, yet another Vāsudeva temple was rebuilt, this time with eight stone pillars aligned in the north-south cardinal axis. Only one of these eight pillars have survived: the Heliodorus pillar.

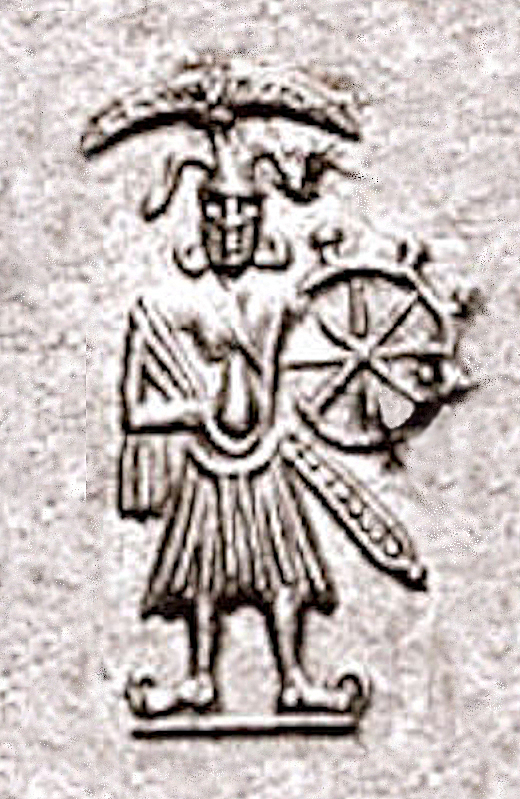
Depiction of Vasudeva circa 190-180 BCE.

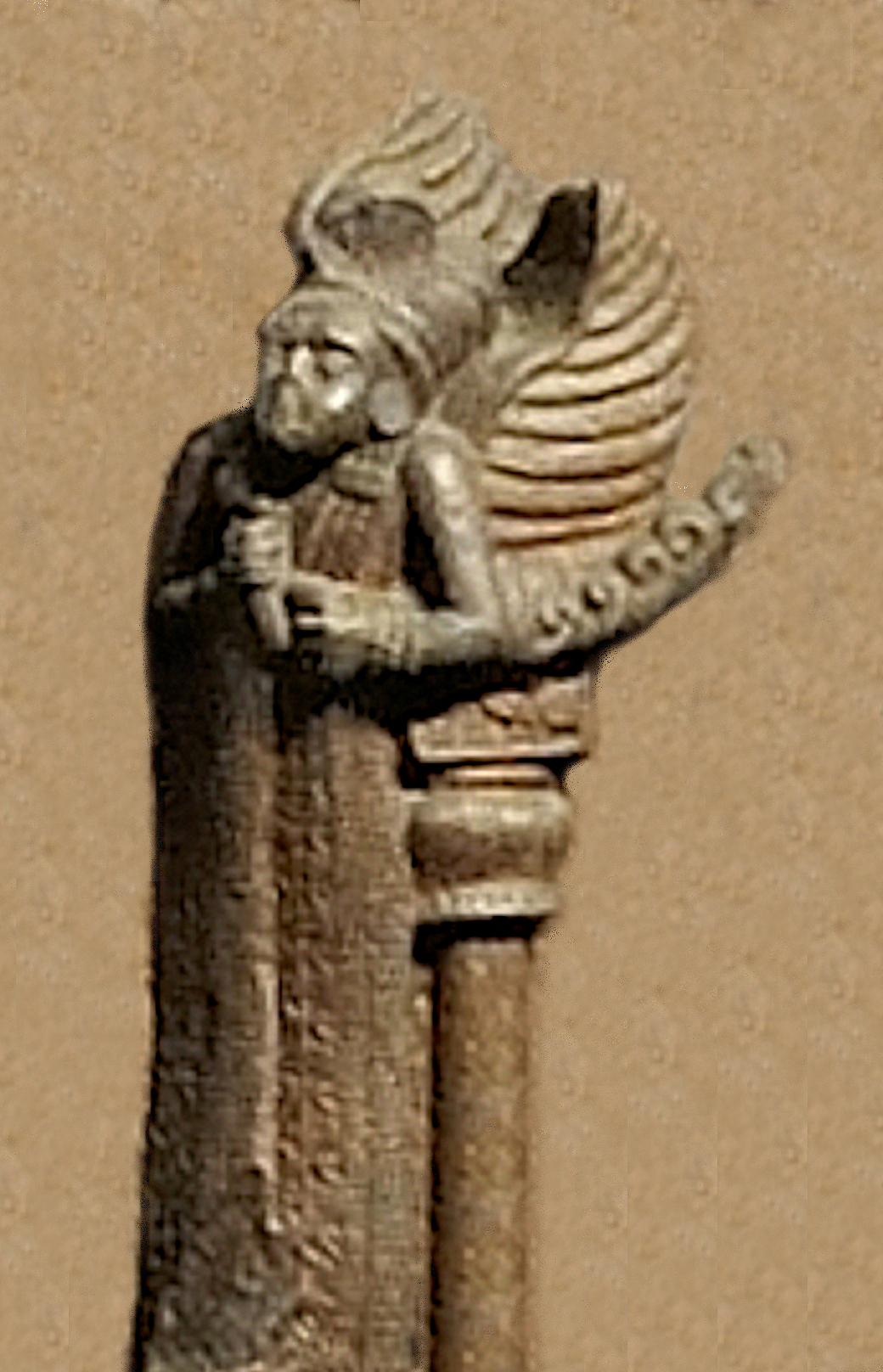
The Garuda, symbol of Vāsudeva, was probably similar to this design from Bharhut, circa 100 BCE.

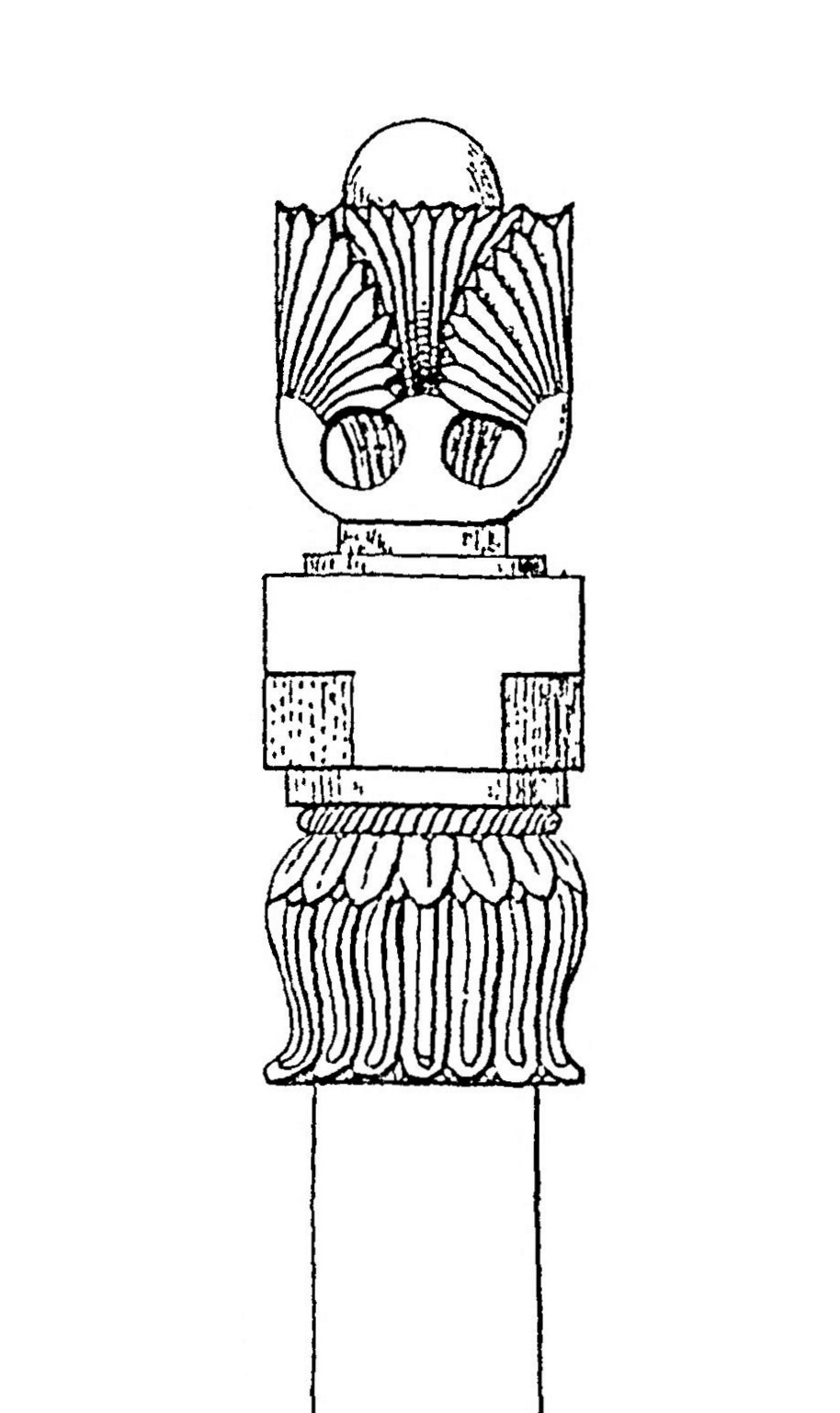
The fan-palm capital, found next to the Heliodorus pillar, is associated with Saṃkarṣaṇa.

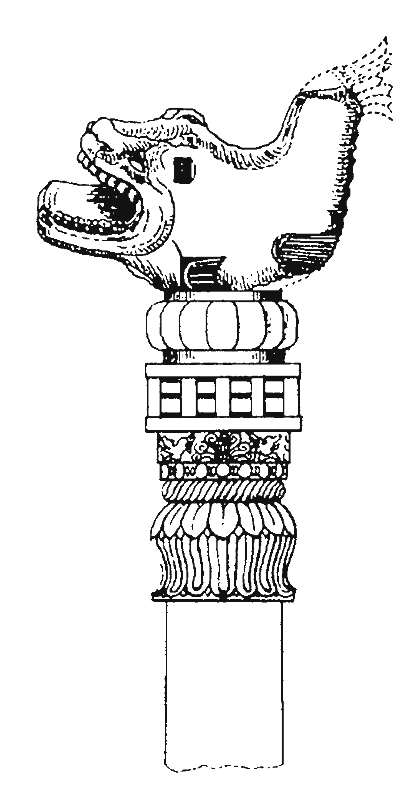
The Makara capital, found at the site of the Heliodorus pillar, is associated with Pradyumna. 2nd century BCE. Gwalior Museum

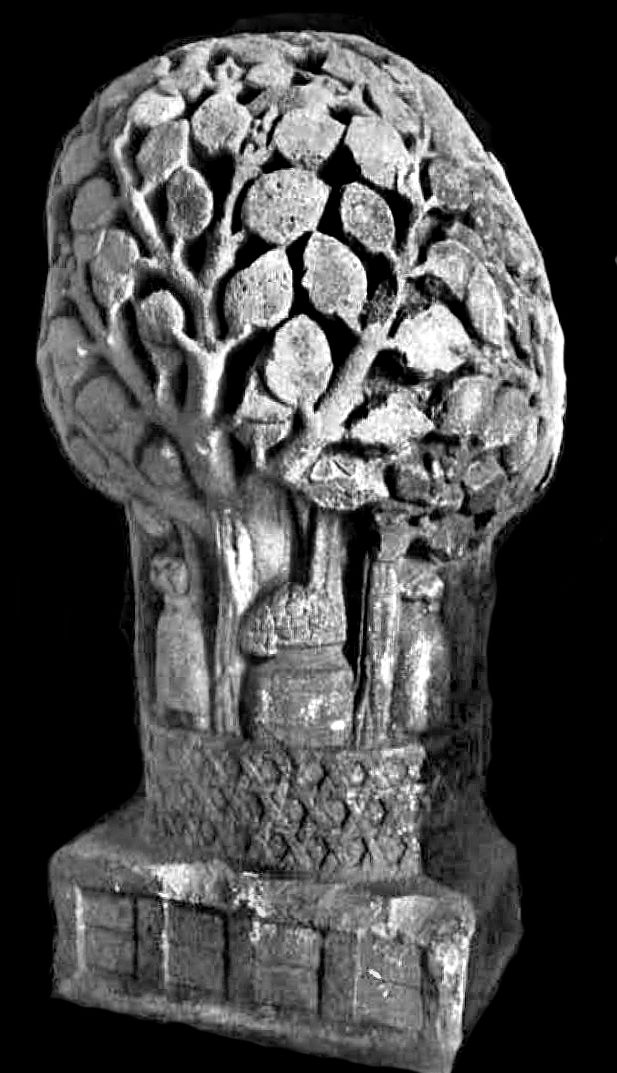
A pillar capital shaped as a Kalpadruma tree, also found nearby at Besnagar, probably associated with Lakshmi.

== Saṃkarṣaṇa in Indo-Scythian coinage (1st century BCE) ==
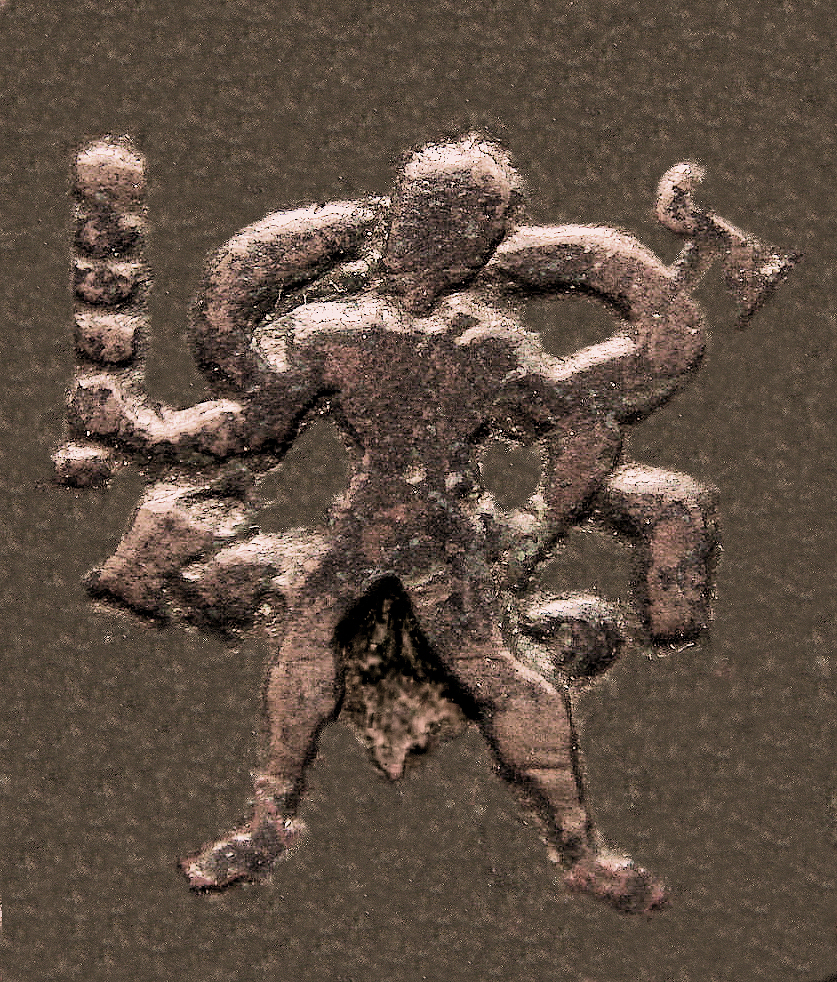
Saṃkarṣaṇa-Balarama with mace and plough, striding forward with billowing scarf, on the coinage of Maues (90-80 BCE).

Saṃkarṣaṇa, the Vrishni elder and the leading divinity until the rise to precedence of Vāsudeva, is known to appear on the coinage of the Indo-Scythian rulers Maues and Azes I during the 1st century BCE. These coins show him holding a mace and a plough.

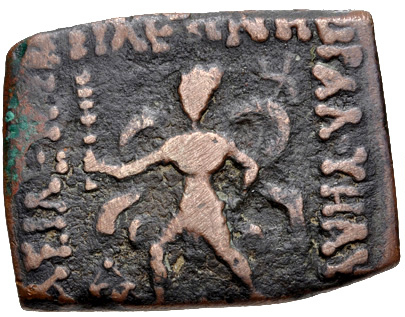
Samkarsana-Balarama on a coin of Maues (90-80 BCE)

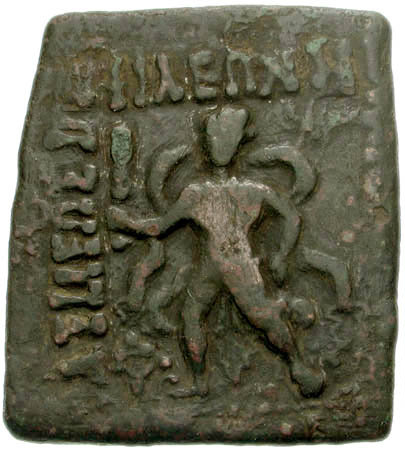
Samkarsana-Balarama on a coin of Maues (90-80 BCE)

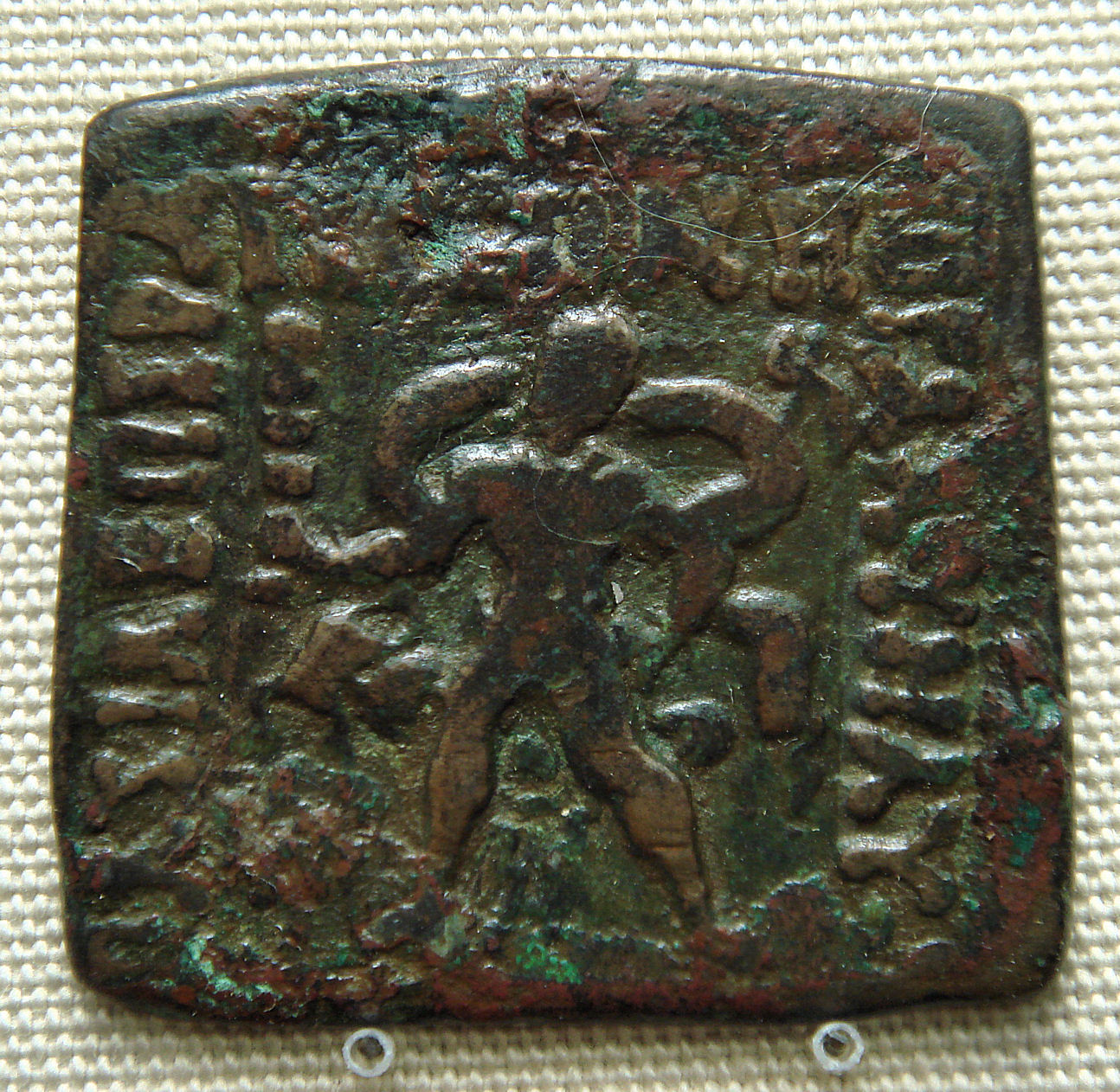
Samkarsana-Balarama on a coin of Maues (90-80 BCE)

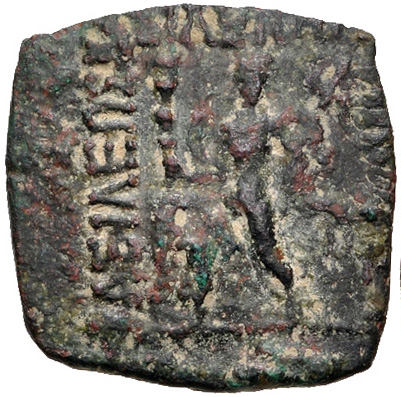
Samkarsana-Balarama on a coin of Azes (58-12 BCE)

== Ghosundi Inscriptions (1st century BCE) ==
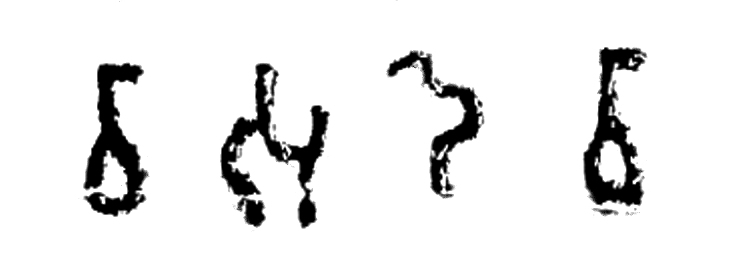
The name Vāsudevā (𑀯𑀸𑀲𑀼𑀤𑁂𑀯𑀸) in the Brahmi script, in the Hathibada Ghosundi inscription, 1st century BCE.

The two major Vrishni heroes Saṃkarṣaṇa and Vāsudeva, still in their proper seniority order, are again mentioned in the Hathibada Ghosundi inscriptions, dated to the 1st century BCE. For the first time they seem to be associated to a higher divinity, as the inscription mention that their cult is made on a precinct of Narayana.

== Mora Vrishni heroes (circa 15 CE) ==
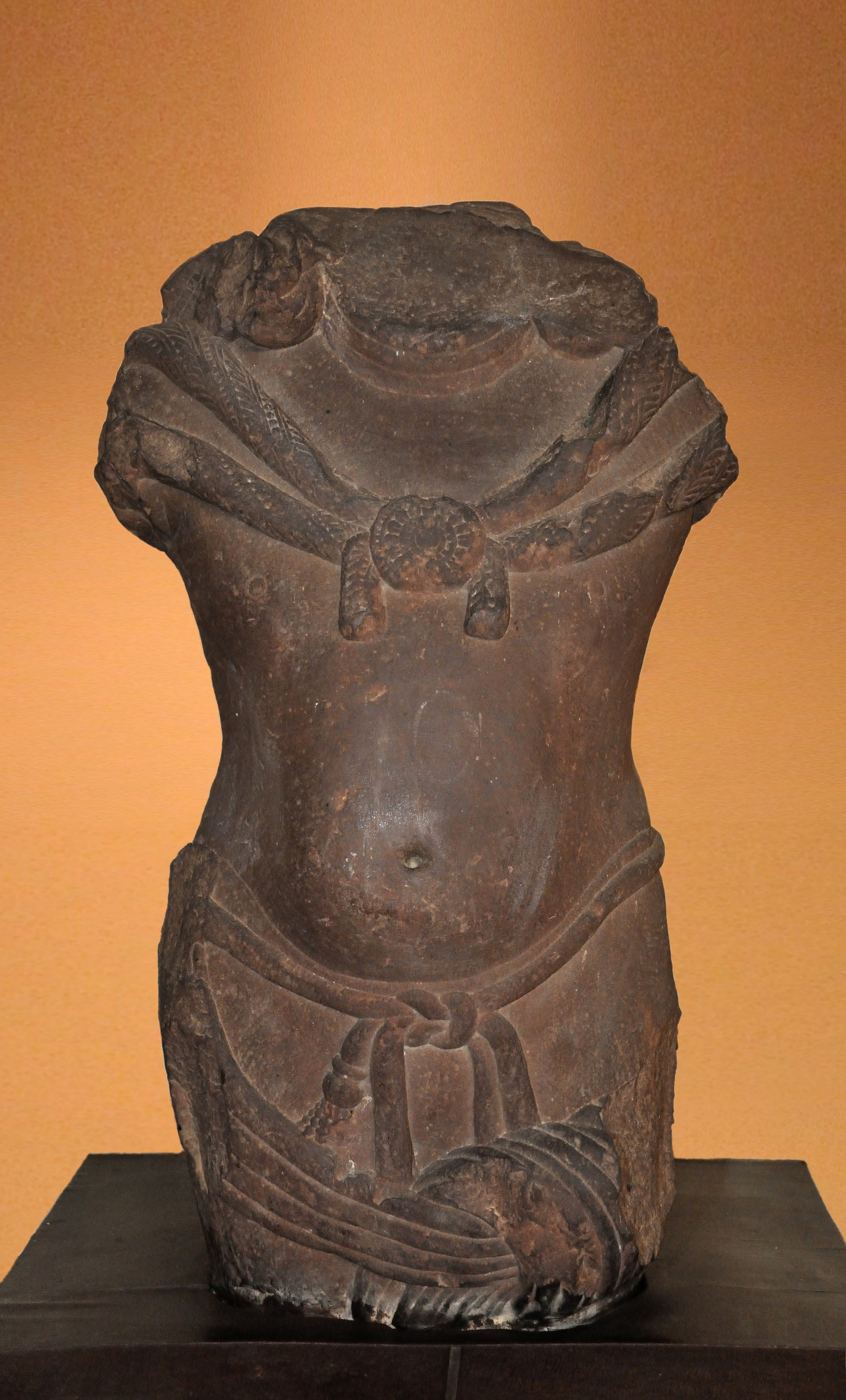
Torso said to be from one of the five Vrishni Heroes, Mora, circa 15 CE, Mathura Museum.

The Vrishni heroes are mentioned in the Mora Well Inscription in Mathura, dated to the time of the Northern Satraps Sodasa, in which they are called Bhagavatam. Statue fragments were found in Mora, which are thought to represent some of the Vrishni heroes. Two uninscribed male torsos were discovered in the mound, both of high craftsmanship and in Indian style and costume. They are similar with minor variations, suggesting they may have been part of a series. They share some sculptural characteristics with the Yaksha statues found in Mathura, such as the sculpting in the round, or the clothing style. Sonya Rhie Quintanilla also supports an attribution of the torso to the five Vrishnis, and dates them to around the time of Sodasa (circa 15 CE), which is confirmed on artistic grounds.

== Vrishni Temples (circa 15 CE) ==
Mention of Vrishni Temples appears in the Mora Well Inscription, which describes a pratima (murti, images), a stone shrine (temple) and calls the five Vrishnis as bhagavatam. The inscription is dated to the early decades of the 1st century CE during the reign of Sodasa, probably circa 15 CE.

A decorated doorjamb, also probably belonging to a Temple, on which is inscribed the Vasu Doorjamb Inscription, is dedicated to deity Vāsudeva, and mentions the rule of the Northern Satrap Sodasa, and has similar carving to the Mora doorjamb. The decoration of these and many similar doorjambs from Mathura consists in scrolls of grapevines. They are all dated to the reign of Sodasa, circa 15 CE and constitute a secure dated artistic reference for the evaluation of datation of other Mathura sculptures. It has been suggested that the grapevine design had been introduced from the Gandhara area in the northwest, and maybe associated with the northern taste of the Satrap rulers. These designs may also be the result of the work of northern artists in Mathura. The grapevine designs of Gandhara are generally considered as originating from Hellenistic art.

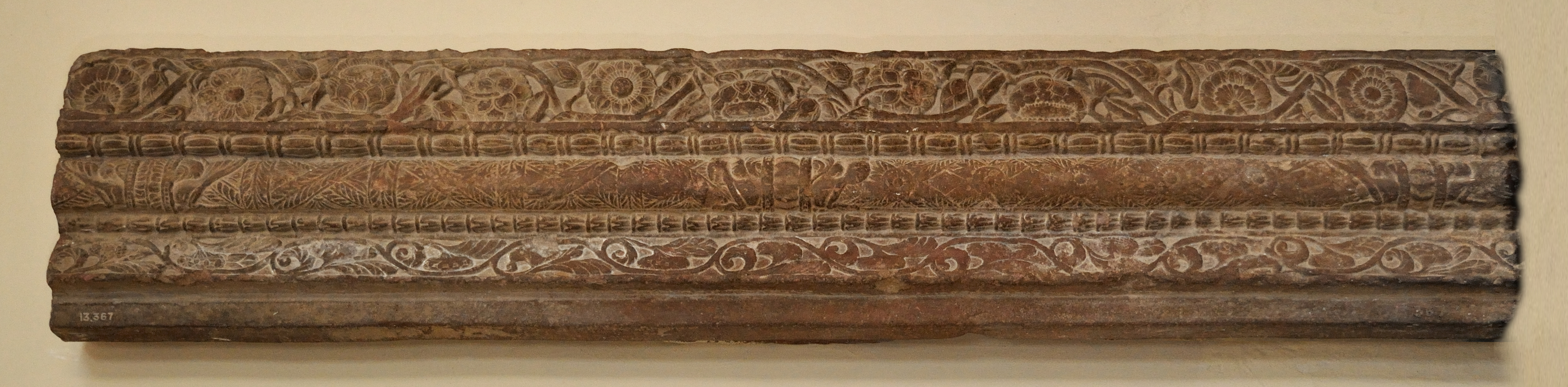
The Vasu doorjamb, dedicated to Vāsudeva "in the reign of Sodasa", Mathura, circa 15 CE. Mathura Museum, GMM 13.367

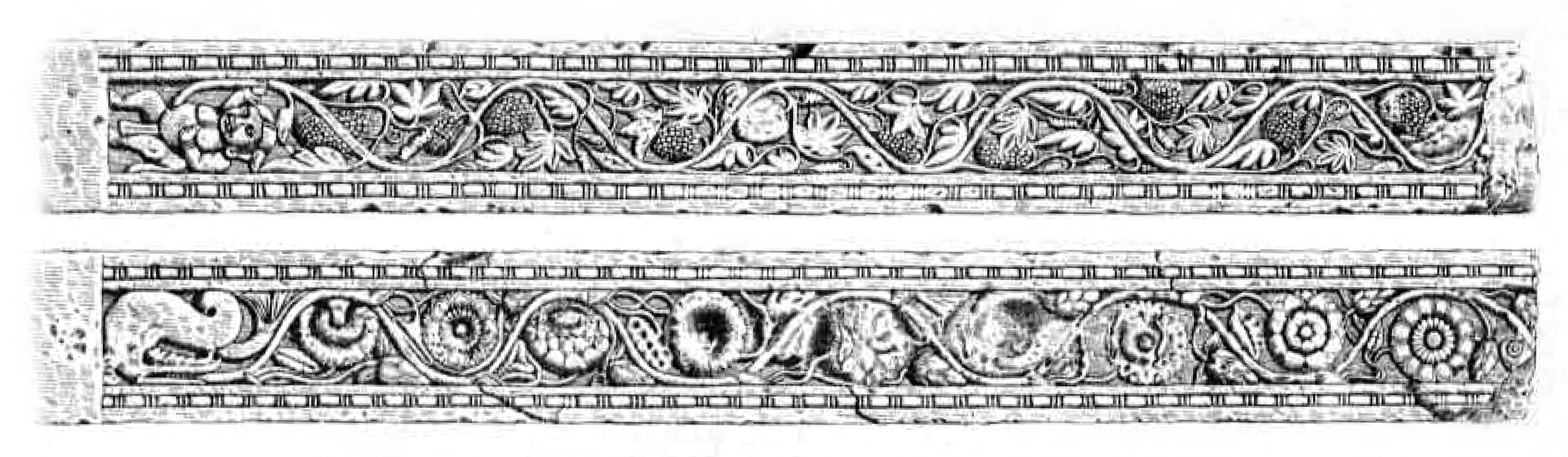
Mora doorjamb with grapevine design, probably belonging to a Vrishni Temple at Mora, near Mathura, circa 15 CE. State Museum Lucknow, SML J.526.

== Chamunda Tila Vrishni symbols (1st century CE) ==
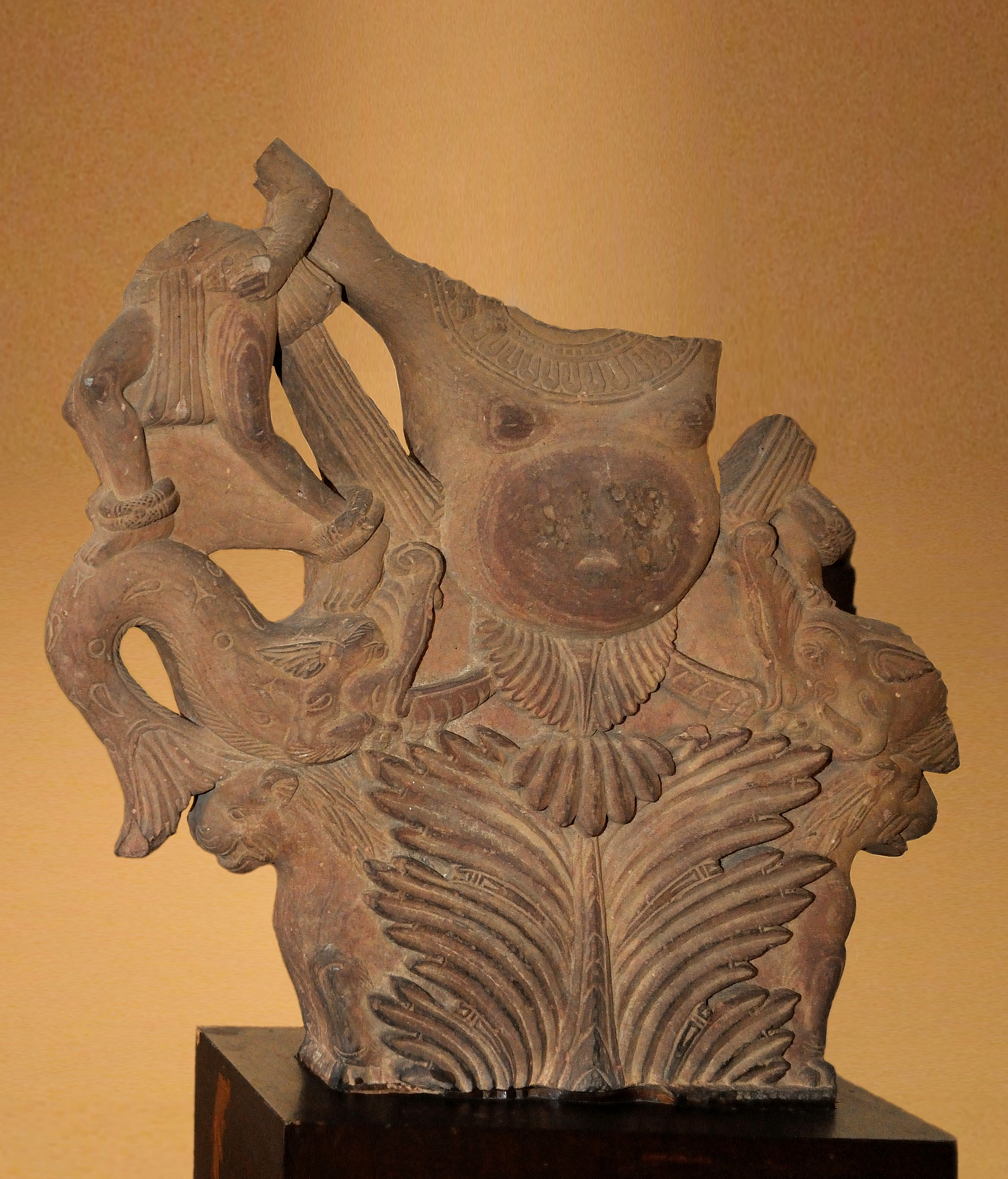
Chamunda Tila pillar capital.

The Chamunda Tila pillar capital, also found in Mathura, may be another example of the Vrishni cult in the area of Mathura, this time using the Vrishni lanchana symbols around a central figure.

This pillar capital uses five symbols on both sides: a lion, a palm leaf, a makara, an adorned woman, and Yaksha in central position, with a probable top symbol missing. The Tāladdhvaja (palm leaf column) is known to symbolize Samkarsana, the Garuḍadhvaja (garuda column) symbolizes Vāsudeva, the Makaradhvaja (makara crocodile column) symbolizes Pradyumna, and the Ṛṣyadhvaja (white antelope column) corresponds to Aniruddha. The lion pillar capital corresponds to Samba. The function of the adorned woman is Sri Rukmini.

The central figure uses the iconography of a Yaksha, pointing to the association of Vrishni iconography with Yasha iconography, as seen in the Mora statue found with the Mora Well Inscription.

== Triads (1st-2nd century CE) ==
A few triads are known from Mathura, dated to the 1st-2nd century CE, showing Vāsudeva and Saṃkarṣaṇa with their attributes, together with a female standing in the middle, thought to be Ekanamsha. In these triads, the kinship of the warrior heroes is still emphasized, with the depiction focusing on the elder brother, the younger brother and the sister, with a prominence still given to the elder brother Samkarsana. They are still presented as warrior "kshatriya" heroes who are not yet fully deified or considered as royals, and are only the object of Bhakti devotional worship towards ancestral heroes, focusing on their enshrined icons.

== Caturvyūha (2nd century CE) ==
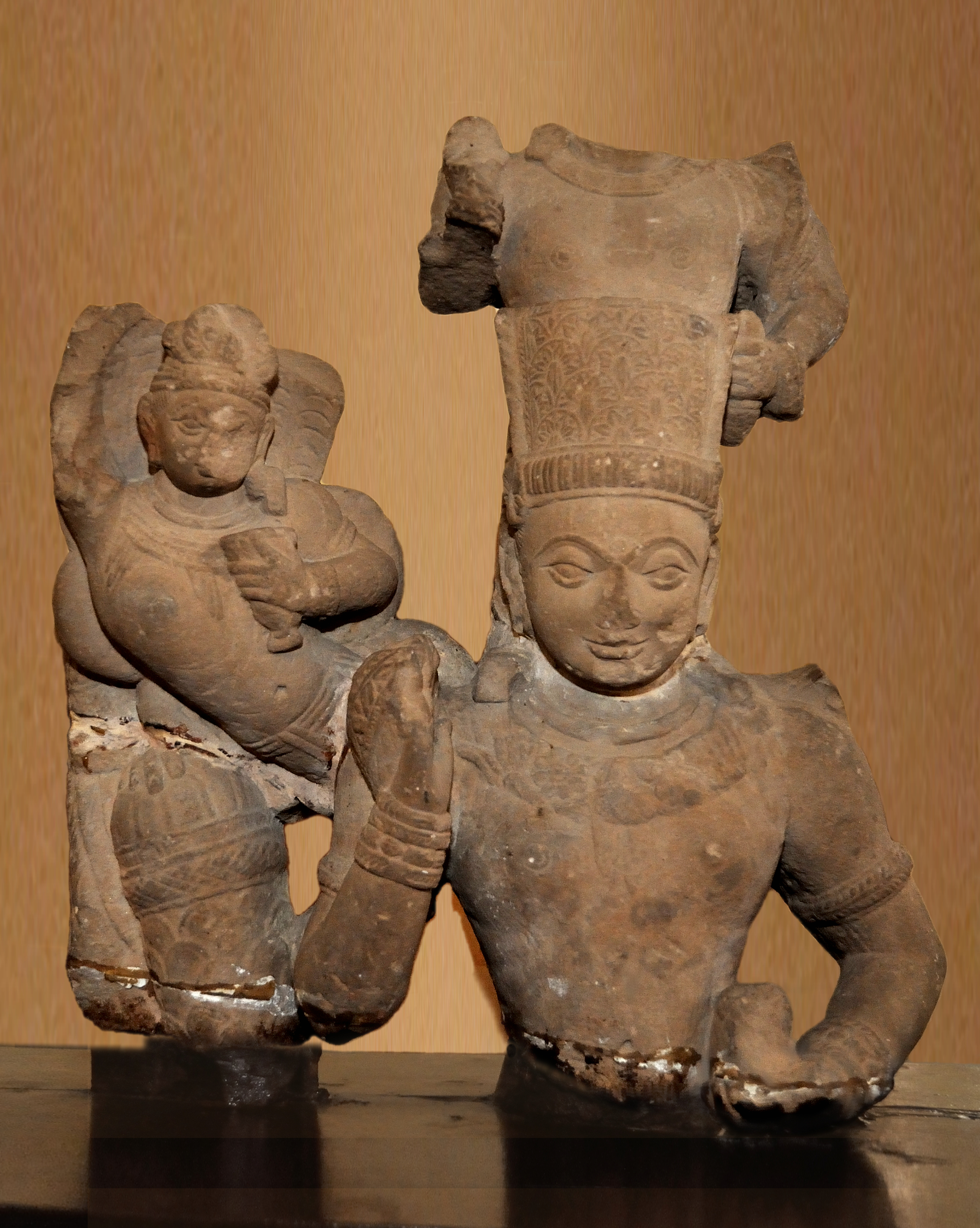
Vāsudeva and his Vrishni kinsmen emanating from him.

The famous "Chatur-vyūha" statue in Mathura Museum is an attempt to show in one composition Vāsudeva together with the other members of the Vrishni clan of the Pancharatra system: Samkarsana, Pradyumna and Aniruddha, with Samba missing, Vāsudeva being the central deity from whom the others emanate. The back of the relief is carved with the branches of a Kadamba tree, symbolically showing the relationship being the different deities.

Vāsudeva is fittingly in the center with ornate crown and flower necklace, making the Abhaya Mudra and holding his decorated heavy mace on the side, his elder brother Balarama to his right under a serpent hood, his son Pradyumna to his left (lost), and his grandson Aniruddha on top.

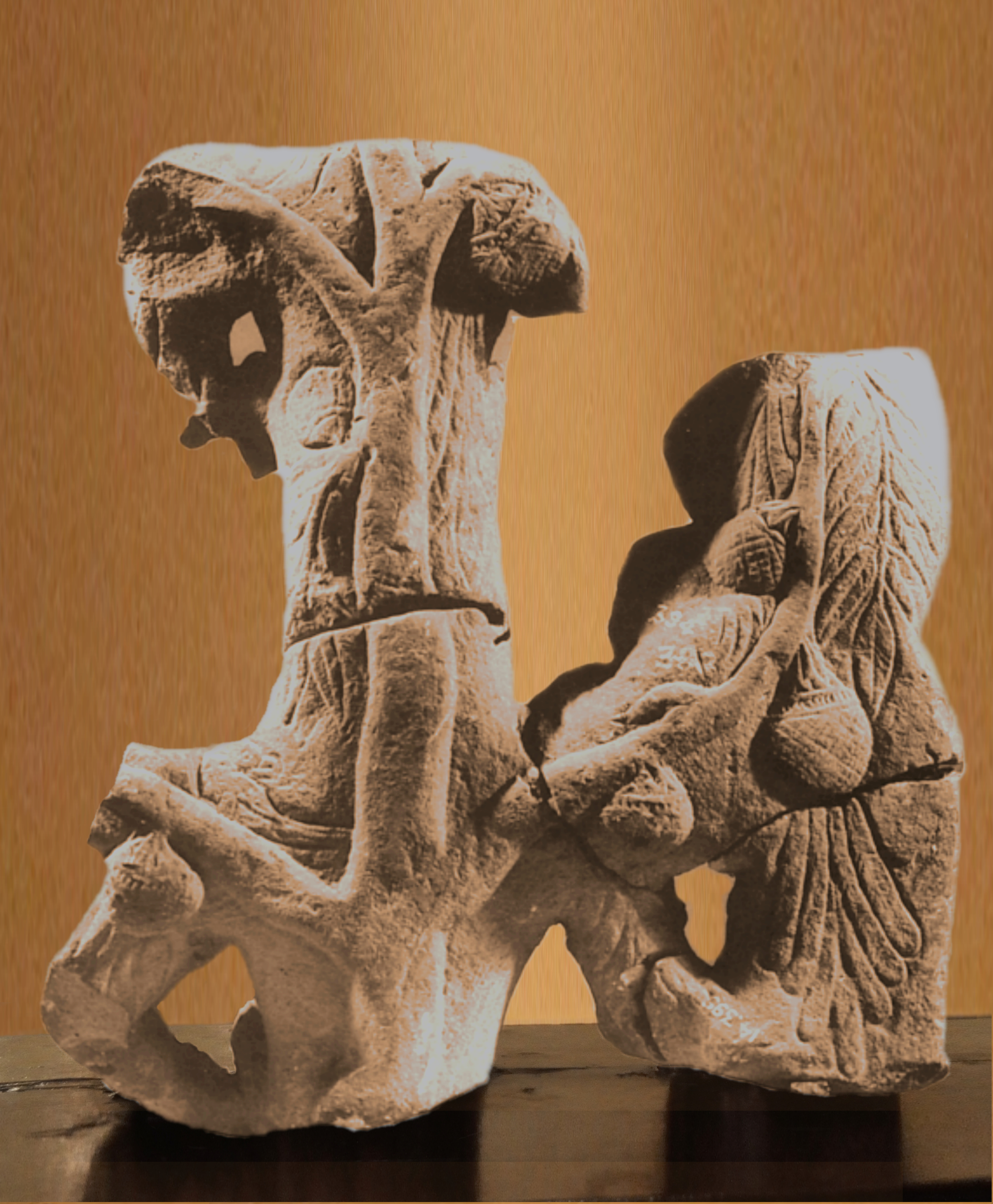
Tree and branches sculpted in the back, showing their genealogical relationship.

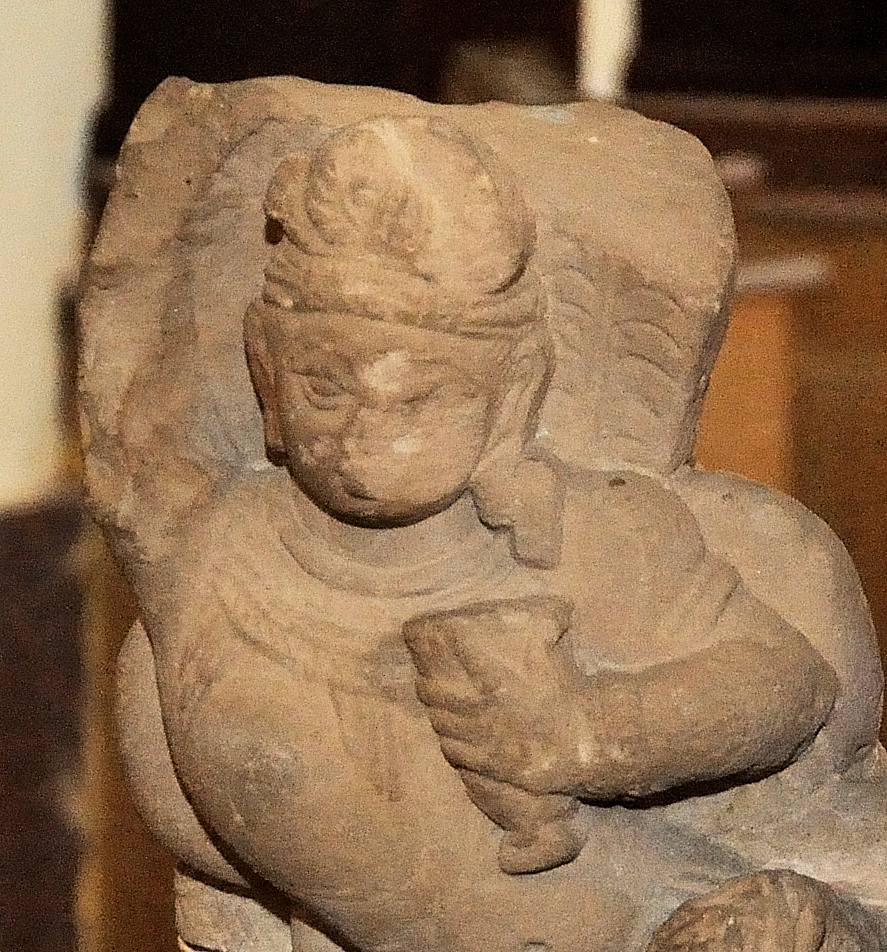
Samkarsana-Balarama under his snake hood holding a cup

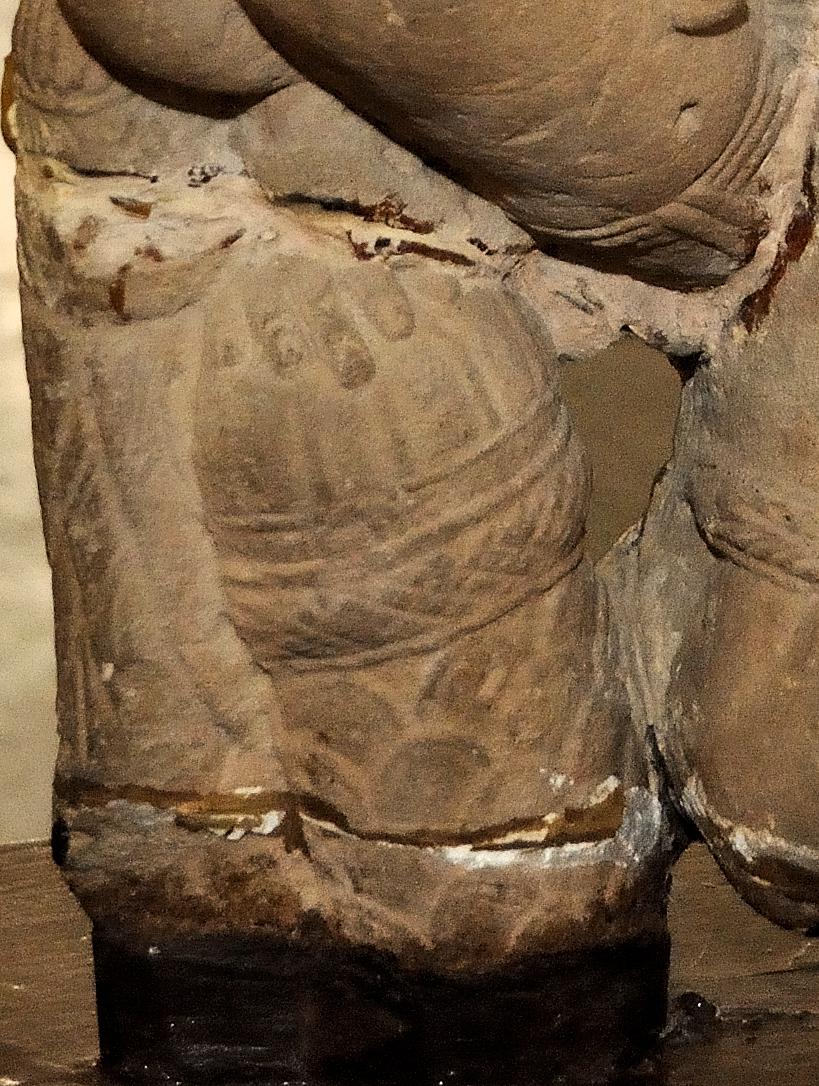
Vasudeva's ornate mace held by one of his supplementary hands

== Cult images of Vāsudeva (2nd-3rd century CE) ==
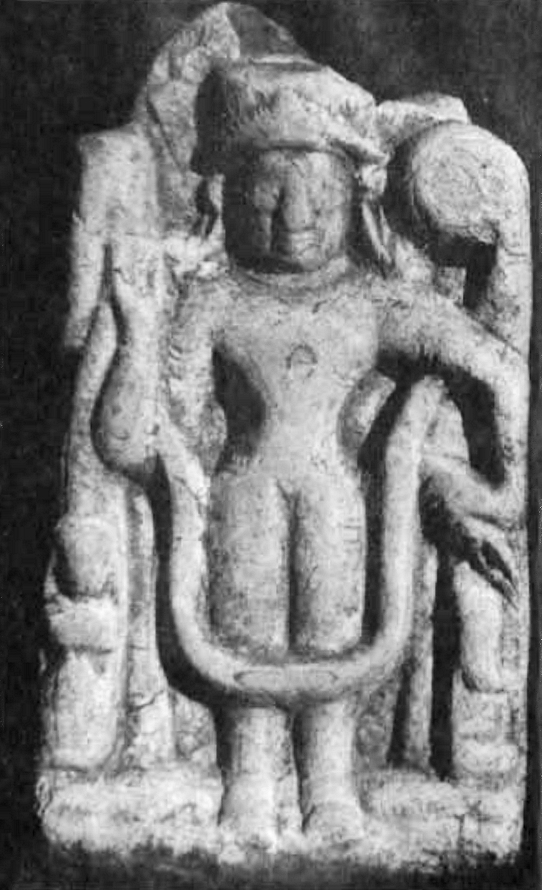
Vasudeva-Krishna with his three attributes (a mace, a wheel and a conch) and an Abhaya mudra hand gesture, but without an aureole, terracotta.

Cult images of Vāsudeva continued to be produced until the 4th century CE, the worship of this Mathuran deity being much more important than that of Vishnu during that period. Statues dating to the 2nd and 3rd century show a possibly four-armed Vāsudeva standing with his attributes: the wheel, the mace and the conch, his right hand saluting in Abhaya mudra. Only with the Gupta period, did statues focusing on the worship of Vishnu himself start to appear, using the same iconography as the statues of Vāsudeva, but with the addition of an aureole starting at the shoulders.

From the 4th century CE, independent devotional statues of Vāsudeva-Krishna become very rare, and are replaced by statues of Vishnu with the addition of an aureole. This suggests with a high probability that the human face in the statues of Vishnu, including those known as Vaikuntha Chaturmurti, is actually the face of his human emanation, Vāsudeva-Krishna.

== Kondamotu Vrishni heroes (4th century CE) ==
A relief from Kondamotu, Guntur district in Andhra Pradesh, dates to the 4th century CE, and shows the Vrishni heroes standing in genealogical order around Narasimha. From left to right, they are: Saṃkarṣaṇa, holding a mace and a ploughshare topped by the depiction of a lion, Vāsudeva, with a hand in abhaya mudra and the other hand on the hip holding a conch shell. Vāsudeva also has a crown, which distinguishes him from the others. Then follow Pradyumna, holding a bow and an arrow, Samba, holding a wine goblet, and Aniruddha, holding a sword and a shield. The fact that they stand around Narasimha suggests a fusion of the Satvata cult with the Vrishni cult.

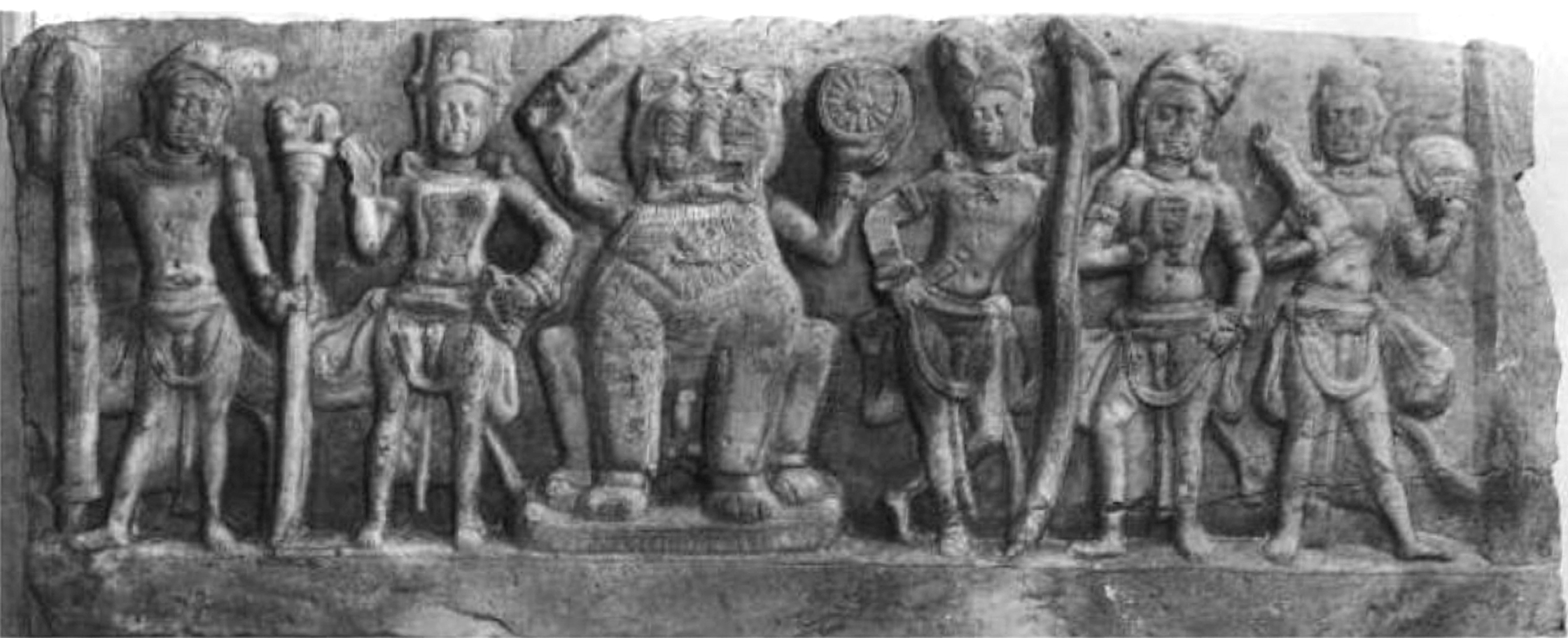
The five Vrishni heroes Saṃkarṣaṇa, Vāsudeva, Pradyumna, Samba, and Aniruddha standing around enthroned Narasimha. Kondamotu Vrishni heroes relief, 4th century CE, Hyderabad State Museum.

== Evolution as avatars of Vishnu (4th century CE-) ==
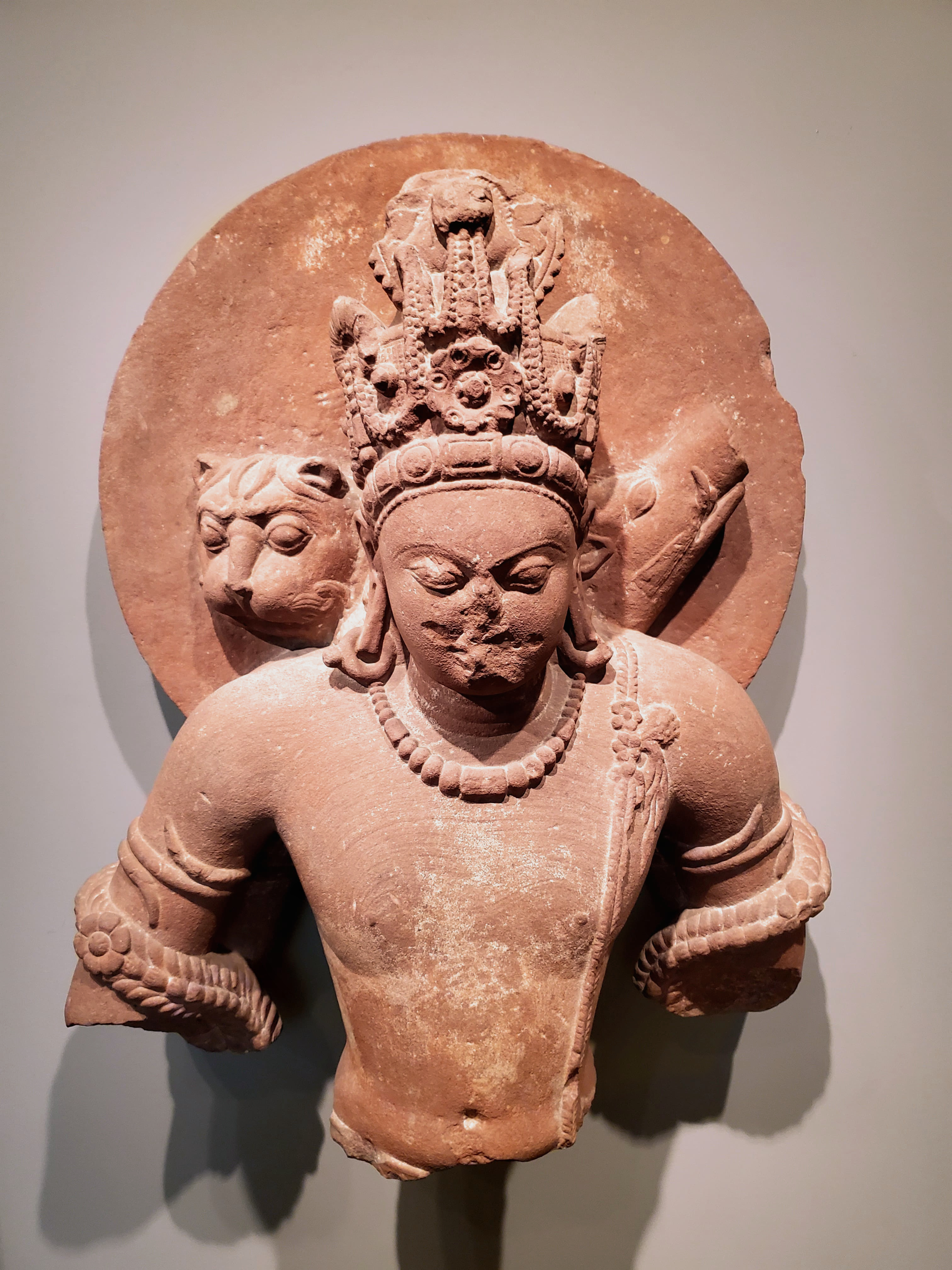
Saṃkarṣaṇa appears as a lion, while Aniruddha appears as a boar in this Vaikuntha Chaturmurti statue, showing Vishnu in his three main emanations, mid-5th century. Boston Museum.

The Vrishni heroes for the most part became avatars of Vishnu, and were incorporated in the Vaishnavite system from the 4th century CE. The avatars were combined in the Vishnu statuary from this time, in statues known as Vaikuntha Chaturmurti.

Saṃkarṣaṇa came to be associated with the lion, which is his theriomorphic aspect. He can be identified as Narasimha. Saṃkarṣaṇa appears as a lion in some of the Caturvyūha statues (the Bhita statue), where he is an assistant to Vāsudeva, and in the Vaikuntha Chaturmurti when his lion's head protrudes from the side of Vishnu's head.

Aniruddha came to be associated with the boar, which is his theriomorphic aspect, also known as Varaha. Aniruddha appears as a boar in some of the Caturvyūha statues, where he is an assistant to Vāsudeva, and in the Vaikuntha Chaturmurti when his boar's head protrudes from the side of Vishnu's head.

In the Vaikuntha Chaturmurti, especially in the statues from Kashmir, Pradyumna also appears sometimes in the back of the head of the central Vishnu, as a fearsome deity, also known as Kapila.

=== Symbolic system ===
The caturvyuha, this Gupta period polycephalic aspect of Vishnu formed by the four Vrishni heroes as his emanations (a Saumya benevolent face to the east, a Simha lion face to the south, a Varaha boar face to the north, a Rudra terrible human face to the west) is described in detail in the Vishnudharmottara Purana (compiled between the 4th and the 7th century CE). This is to be understood in conjunction with the description of the four Vyūhas Saṃkarṣaṇa, Vāsudeva, Pradyumna, and Aniruddha, also presented as emanations of Vishnu, as known from the Pancaratra doctrine. This establishes multiple correspondences between the deities and their symbols:

Pāñcarātra system
	Vyūhas	Image	Attributes	Symbol	Direction	Face	Concept
Narayana; Vishnu	Vāsudeva		Chakra Wheel; Gadā Mace; Shankha Conch	Garuda Eagle	East	Saumya (Placid/ benevolent)	Jṅāna Knowledge
Narayana; Vishnu	Samkarsana		Lāṅgala Plough; Musala Pestle; Wine glass	Tala Fan palm	South	Simha Lion	Bala Strength
Narayana; Vishnu	Pradyumna		Cāpa Bow; Bāṇa Arrow	Makara Crocodile	West	Raudra Kapila	Aiśvaryā Sovereignty
Narayana; Vishnu	Aniruddha		Carma Shield; Khaḍga Sword	Ṛṣya (ऋष्य) White-footed antelope	North	Varaha Boar	Śakti Power

== Dashavatara Temple, Deogarh (6th century CE) ==
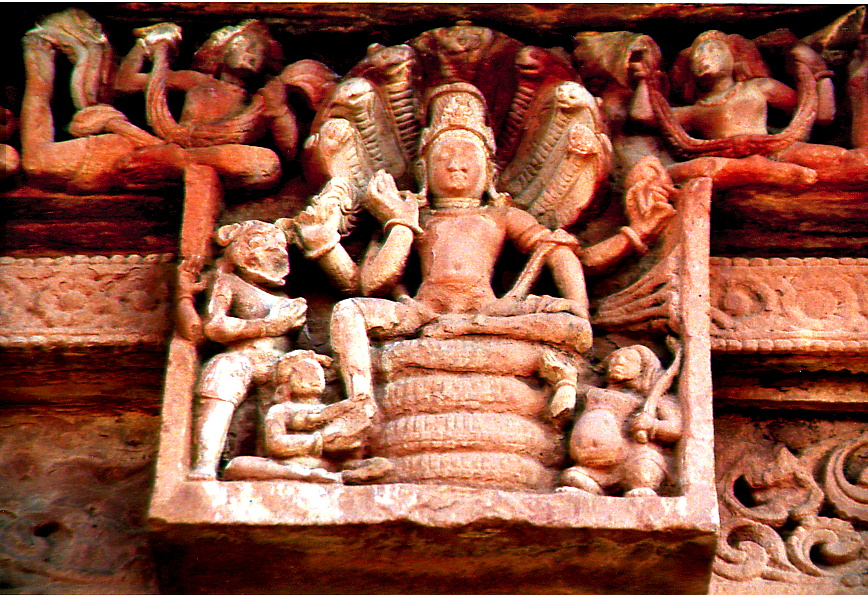
A depiction of Vāsudeva at Deogarh. He holds the wheel, the conch and salutes in Abhaya Mudra.

The Dashavatara Temple in Deogarh is closely related to the iconic architectural temple structure described in the Viṣṇudharmottara purāṇa, and can be interpreted as an architectural representation of the Caturvyuha concept and the Pancaratra doctrine, centering on the depictions of the four main emanations of Vishnu: Vāsudeva, Samkarshana, Pradyumna and Aniruddha. According to Lubotsky, it is likely that the entrance is dedicated to the Vāsudeva aspect of Vishnu; the Anantashayana side is his role as the creator (Aniruddha); the sage form of Nara-Narayana side symbolizes his preservation and maintainer role in cosmic existence (Pradyumna); and the Gajendramoksha side represents his role as the destroyer (Samkarsana).

== Later depictions of the Vrishni heroes ==
The Vrishni heroes – particularly Krishna and Balarama – are still found in some Vaishnava Hindu temples.

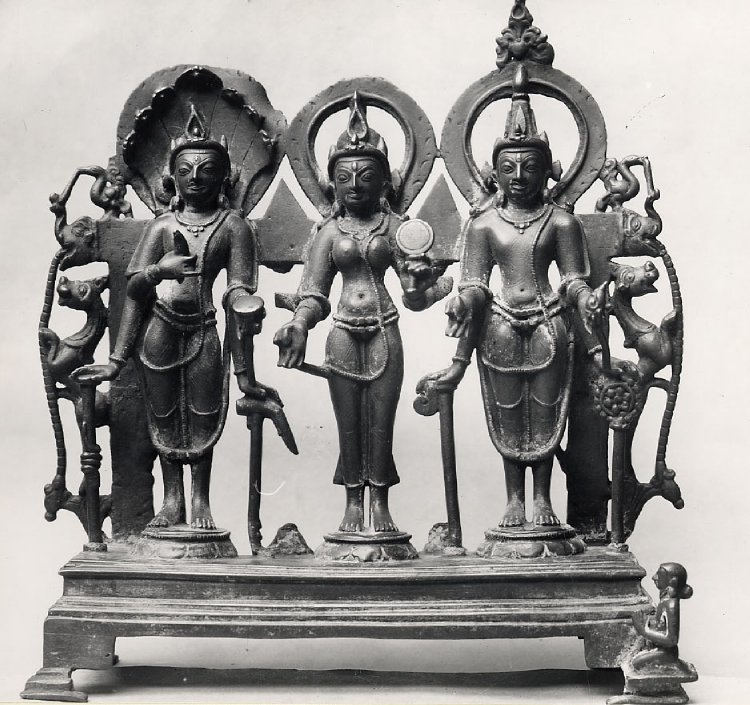
11th century Balarama, Lakshmi (or perhaps, Subhadra), Vasudeva (Krishna, Jagannath)

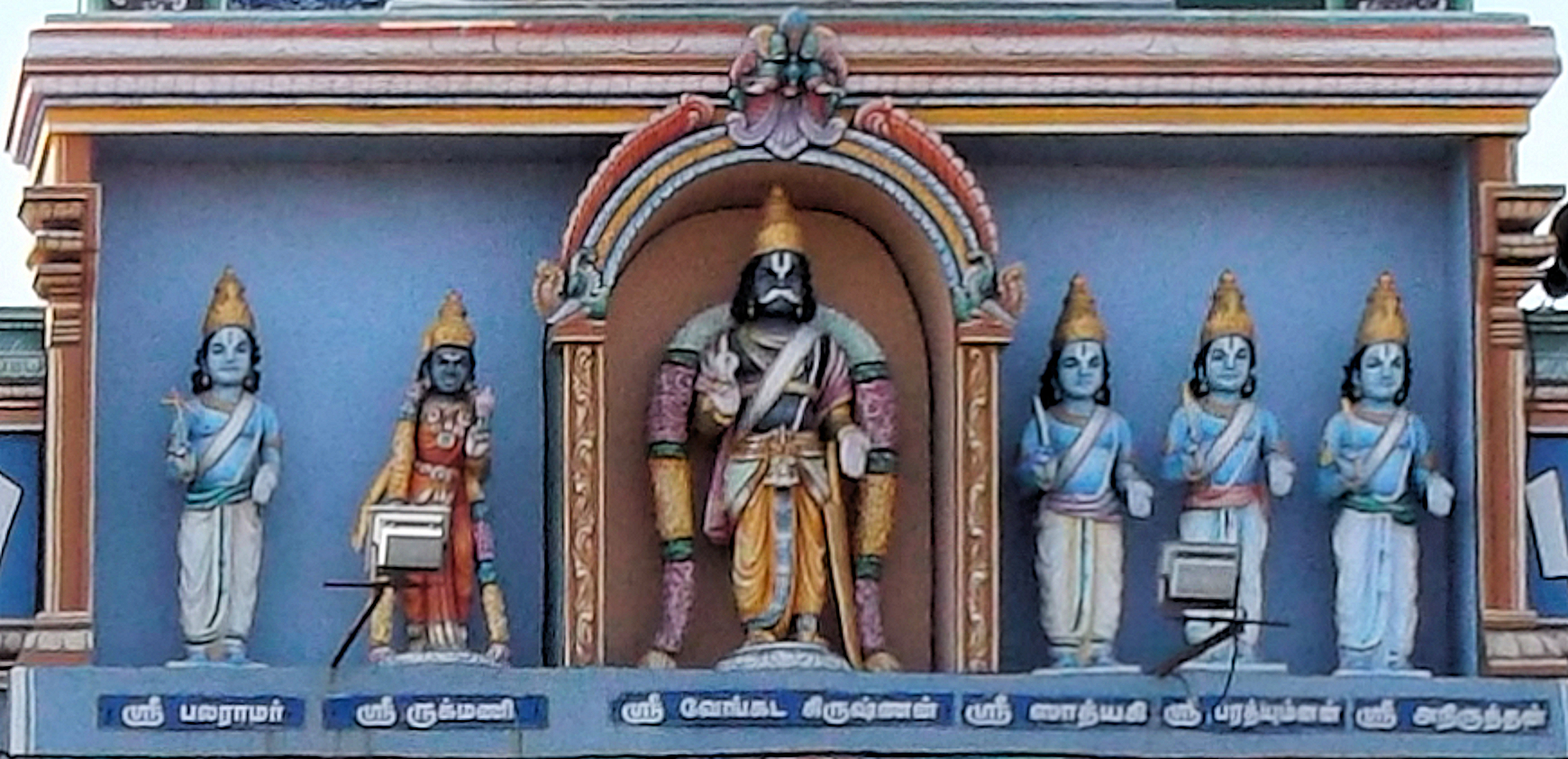
The five Vrishni heroes standing in the Parthasarathy Temple, Eastern Torana Entrance. From left to right: Balarama, Rukmini, Vasudeva-Krishna (center), Pradyumna, Aniruddha and Satyaki

== See also ==
- Balarama
- Chinese hero cult
- Deification
- Greek hero cult
- Hero worship
- Vaishnavism
- Vasudeva
- Vrishni

== Sources ==
- Srinivasan, Doris (1979). "Early Vaiṣṇava Imagery: Caturvyūha and Variant Forms". Archives of Asian Art. 32: 39–54. ISSN 0066-6637. JSTOR 20111096.
- John Irwin (1974). "The Heliodorus Pillar at Besanagar". Purātattva. 8. Archaeological Society of India (co-published Art and Archaeology Research Papers, USA): 166–176.
- M D Khare (1967). "Discovery of a Vishnu temple near the Heliodorus pillar, Besnagar, Dist. Vidisha (MP)". Lalit Kala. 13: 21–27. JSTOR 44138838.
- M D Khare (1975). "The Heliodorus Pillar – A Fresh Appraisal: A Rejoinder". Proceedings of the Indian History Congress. 36: 92–97. JSTOR 44138838.
