= Mora Well Inscription =

1st-century Sanskrit inscription found near Mathura

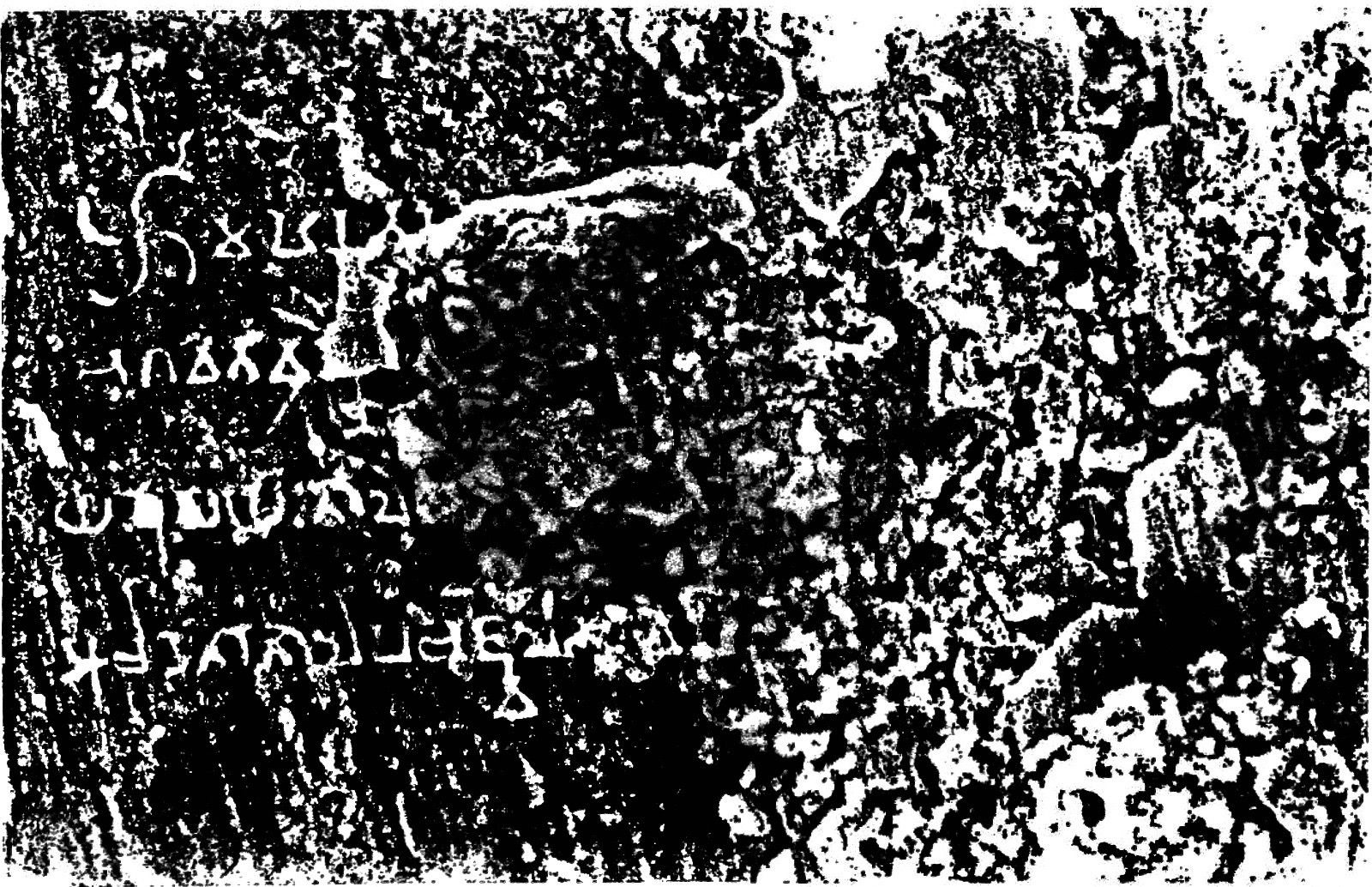
- Ancient Sanskrit inscription Mathura GMM Q.1
- Writing: Sanskrit
- Created: circa 15 CE
- Discovered: 27.515040°N 77.587409°E
- Place: Mathura, Uttar Pradesh
- Present location: Government Museum, Mathura (27.495382°N 77.679540°E)
- Identification: GMM Q.1

Location
- Mora (Mathura) (India) Location of Mora, near Mathura

Mora artefacts
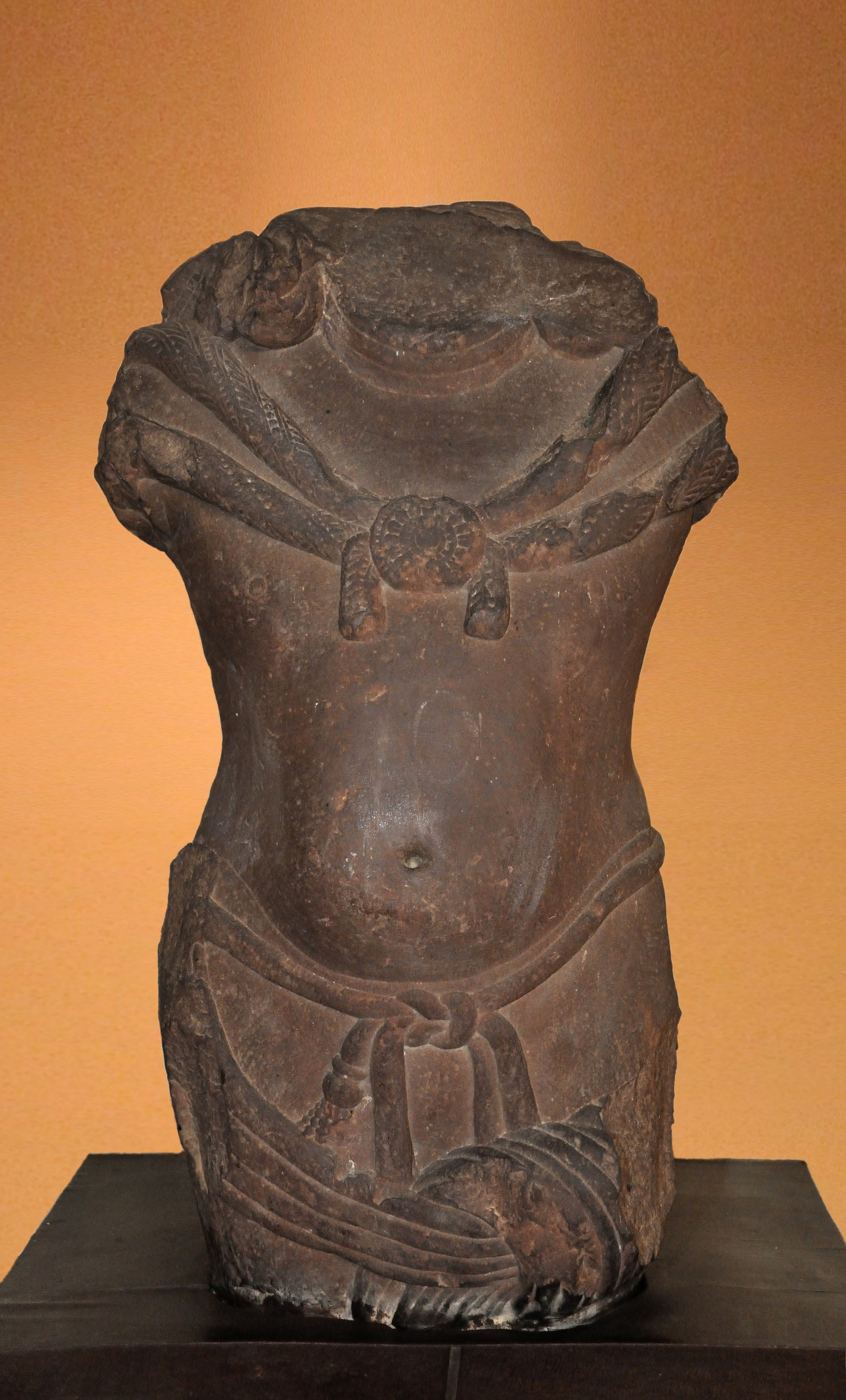
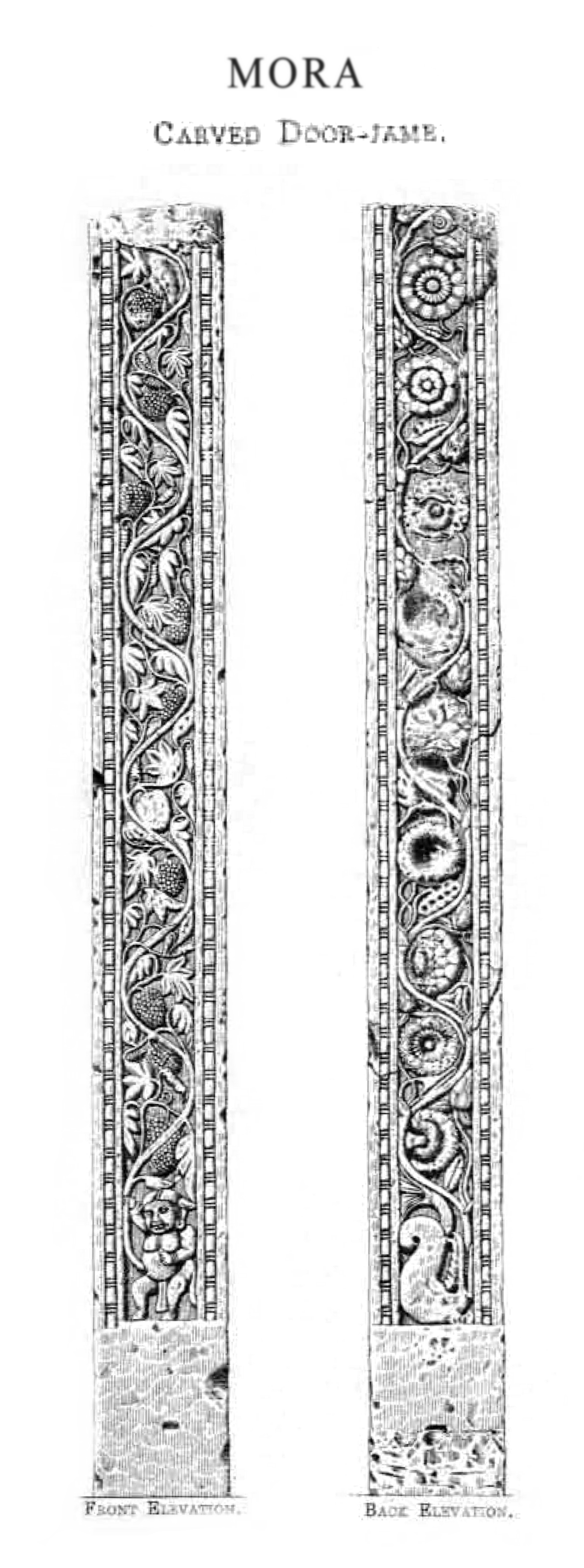
The Mora inscription is associated with three statue remains and a decorated doorjamb, all thought to be related to the temple built for the Vrishni heroes. Left: torso said to be probably a figure of one of the five Vrishni heroes, Mora, circa 15 CE, Art of Mathura, Mathura Museum. Right: Mora carved doorjamb, also circa 15 CE, found together with the Mora Well Inscription.

The Mora Well inscription is an ancient Sanskrit inscription found in the village of Mora about 7 miles (11 km) from Mathura, India. It is notable for its early mention of pratima (images), stone temple, and the Pancaviras.

== Description ==
The Mora Well Inscription makes an early mention of pratima (murti, images), stone shrine (temple) and calls the five Vrishnis as bhagavatam. It is dated to the early decades of 1st century CE during the reign of Sodasa, probably circa 15 CE.

=== Identification ===
The Mora Well inscription does not use specifically sectarian language, and various interpretations have been given.

The Hindu Puranas, such as the medieval Vayu Purana in section 97.1-2, name Samkarsana, Vasudeva, Pradyumna, Samba and Aniruddha as "heroes of the dynasty of the Vrishni". The inscription may also signify the growth of Bhagavatism in 1st millennium BCE to Vaishnavism by the early centuries of the common era, and a process by which heroes and heroic ideas attract devotion. There is no mention of these heroes in ancient Brahmanical literature, but some scholars, such as Chandra, state that the five Vrishnis mentioned in the inscription is a reference to the Pandavas of the Mahabharata.

According to Sonya Quintanilla, the Mora inscription is not sectarian and may not necessarily relate to the roots of Vaishnavism. It could be cross-sectarian – Jainism and Hinduism, or equally possibly reflect early Bhagavata movement, states Quintanilla. According to Rosenfield, the Mora well inscription refers to the five Vrishni heroes, but their exact identity is unclear. They – including Vasudeva and Krishna – may have been ancient kings in the Mathura area, who became deified because of their heroic accomplishments. They "personified certain qualities of Vishnu and thus in effect [were deified as] his avatars", states Rosenfield, and this may be "an extremely early form of Vaishnavism now called Pancaratra system" also found in Besnagar, Nanaghat and Ghasundi. Another explanation is that of Luders, who relying on Jain texts dated between 9th and 12th-century CE, states that the Vrishnis may have been the five Jain heroes led by Akrūra. The cult of the Vrishnis may have been cross-sectarian, much like the cult of the Yakshas.

=== Reign of Sodasa ===
The inscription mentions the name of the Great Satrap Rajuvula, and was apparently made by his son, the Great Satrap of Mathura Sodasa.

The discovery of the Mora Well Inscription in the 19th-century led archaeologists to excavate the Mora Mound in 1911-12, near the Mora well. They found large inscribed bricks of a round brick building with the name of a female, probably the daughter of king Brihasvatimitra from Kausambi of late 2nd century BCE. In the mound were also found two male torsos, as well as a lower half of a female torso with inscribed names Kanishka and Tosha, confirming the possible link between the inscription stone and the mound.

== Inscription ==
The discovered inscription is incomplete. The opening is hybrid Sanskrit, while the remaining three lines are standard Sanskrit. It reads:

1. mahakṣatrapasa rāṁjūvulasa putrasa svāmi ...
2. bhagavatāṁ vr̥ṣṇīnā[ṁ] paṁcavīrāṇāṁ pratimā[ḥ] śailadevagr̥[he] ...
3. ya[s] toṣāyāḥ śailaṁ śrimadgr̥ham atulam udadha samadhāra ...
4. ārcādeśāṁ śailām paṁca jvalata iva paramavapuṣā ...

– Mora Well Inscription, 1st century CE

== Translation ==
Sonya Quintanilla translates it as,

. . . of the son of mahakṣatrapa Rāṁjūvula, svāmi . . .
the images of the holy paṁcavīras of the Vr̥ṣṇis. . .
the stone shrine... whom the magnificent matchless stone house of Toṣā was erected and maintained...
five objects of adoration made of stone, radiant, as it were with highest beauty...

== See also ==
- Hindu temple
- Hindu temple architecture
- Mountain Temple inscription
