= Hero worship =

Hero worship may refer to:

- Hero cult in ancient Greece
- Apotheosis, raising a person to the level of a deity
- Cult of personality, a political weapon used mainly in dictatorships
- On Heroes, Hero-Worship, & the Heroic in History, an 1841 book by Thomas Carlyle
- Hero Worship (Sandra Bernhard album), a 2003 album released by Sandra Brnhard
- Hero Worship (Hal Crook album), Hal Crook's fifth album as a leader
- "Hero Worship", an episode of the sitcom The King of Queens
- "Hero Worship" (Star Trek: The Next Generation), a 1992 episode of Star Trek: The Next Generation
- "Hero Worship", a song by The B-52's which is included on their debut album, The B-52's
