= Hindu art =

Art associated with Hindus

Hindu art
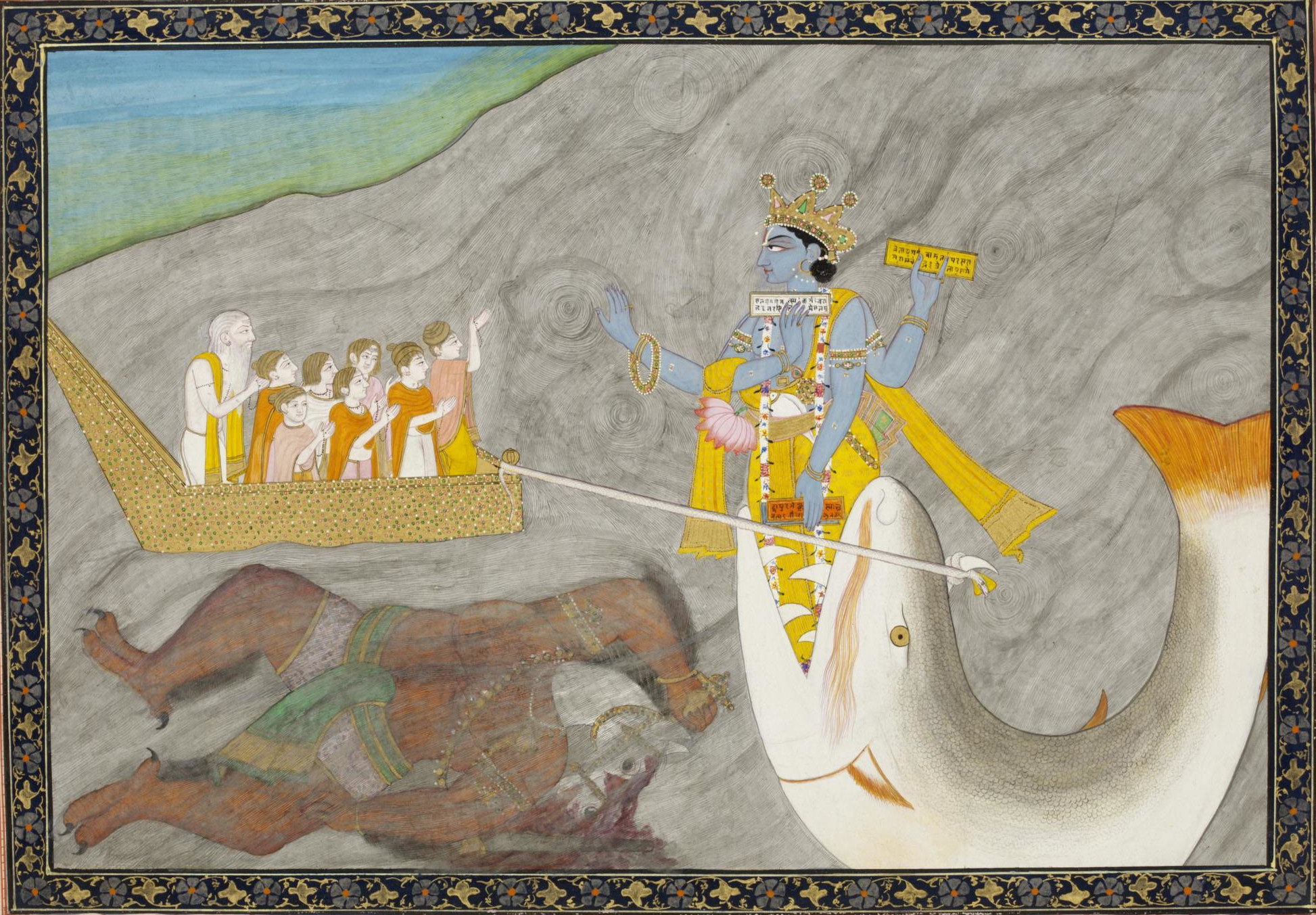
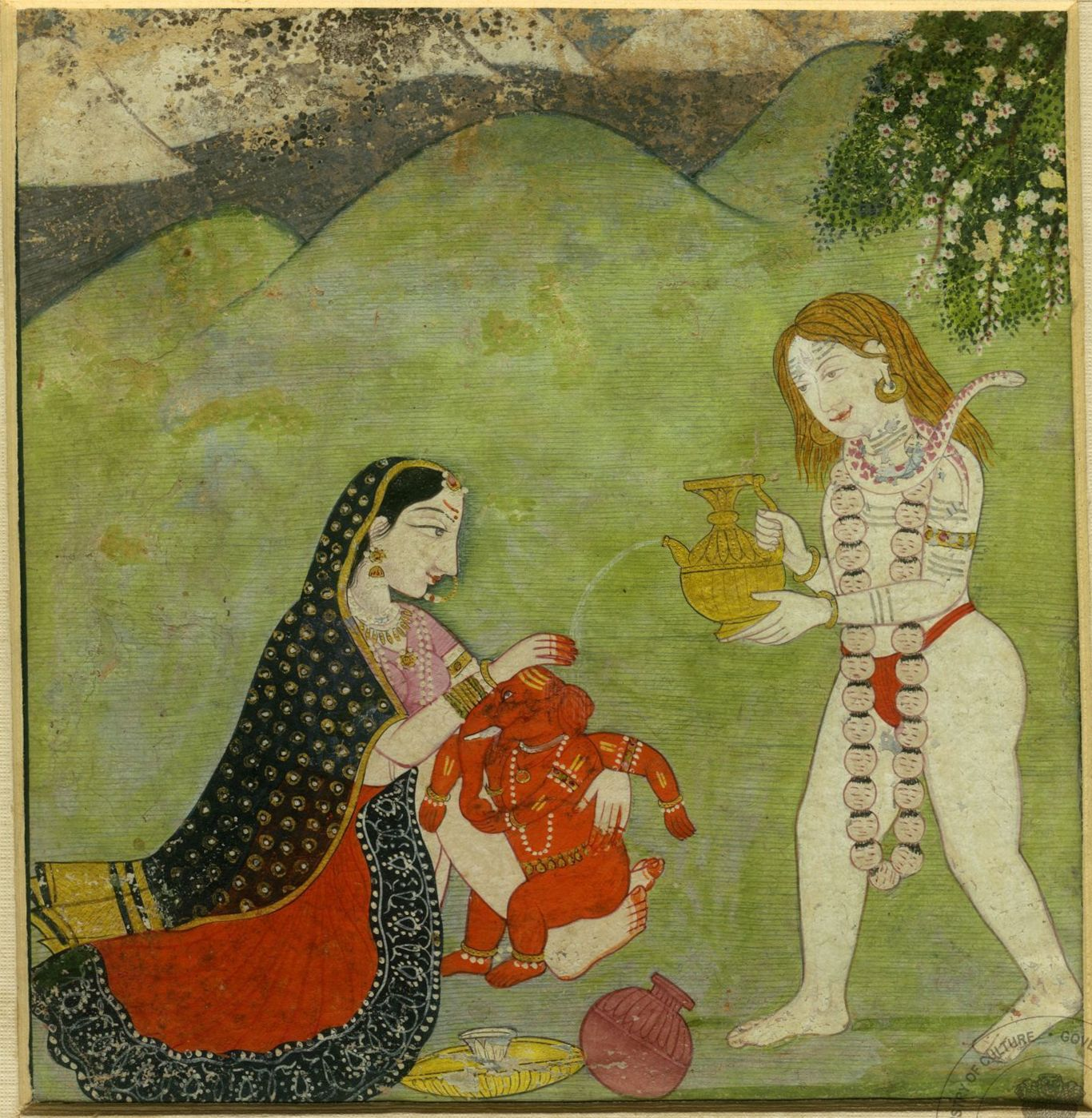
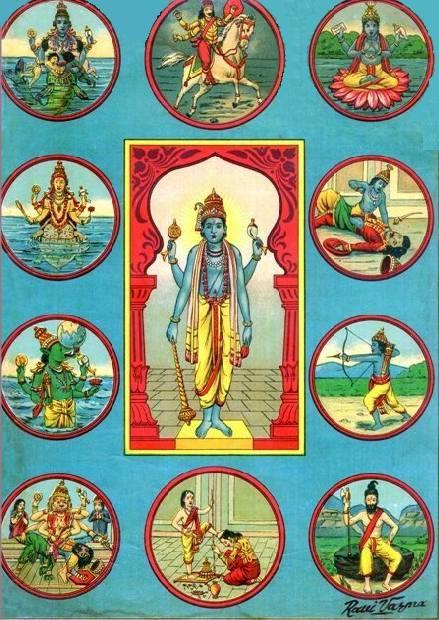
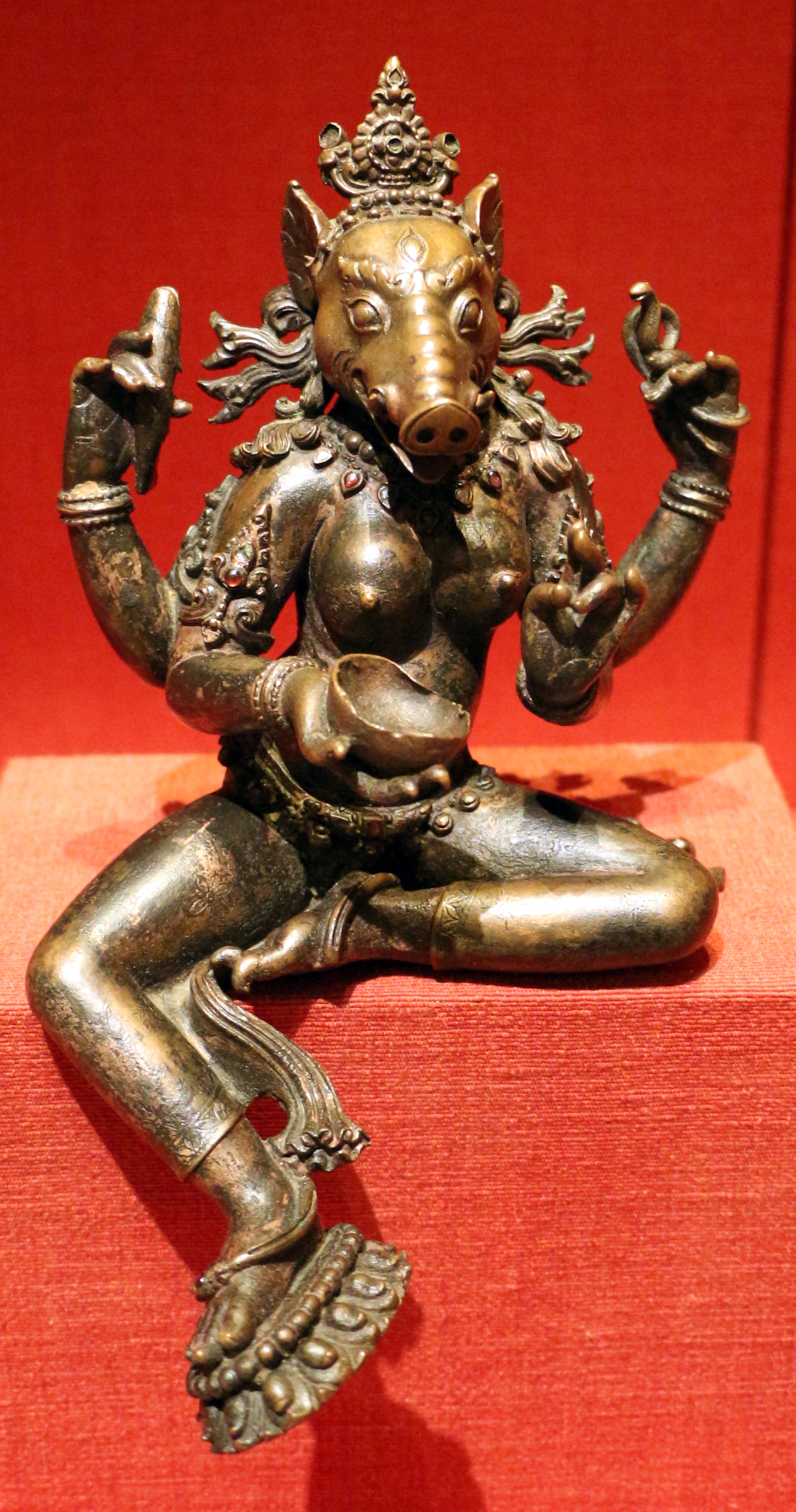
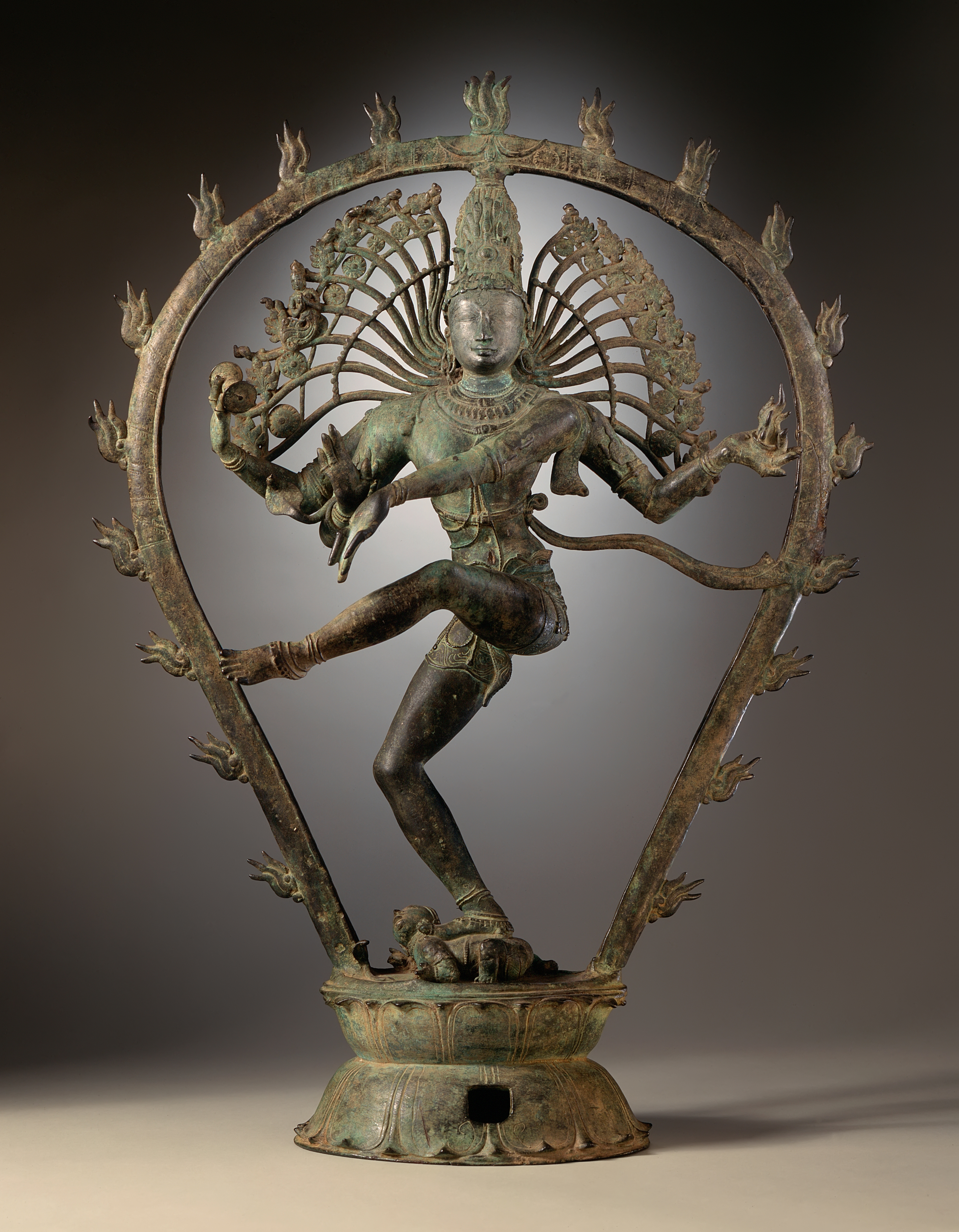
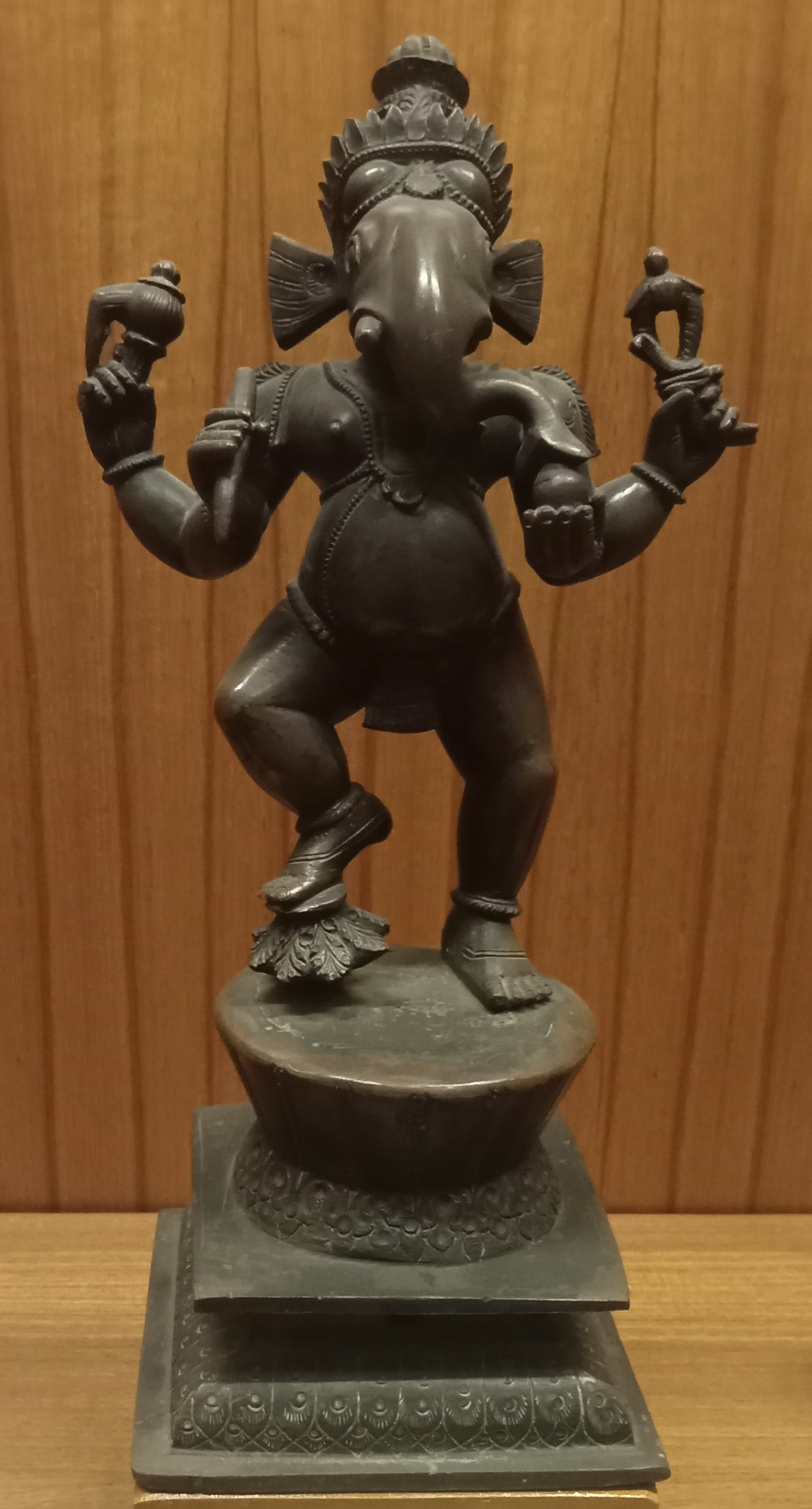
Hindu artworks and artifacts from different periods.

Hindu art encompasses the artistic traditions and styles culturally connected to Hinduism and have a long history of religious association with Hindu scriptures, rituals and worship.

== Background ==
Hinduism, with its 1.2 billion followers, is the religion of about 15-16 % of the world's population and as such the culture that ensues it is full of different aspects of life that are effected by art. There are 64 traditional arts that are followed that start with the classics of music and range all the way to the application and adornment of jewellery. Since religion and culture are inseparable with Hinduism recurring symbols such as the gods and their reincarnations, the lotus flower, extra limbs, and even the traditional arts make their appearances in many sculptures, paintings, music, and dance.

== History ==
=== Earliest depictions of Hindu deities (3rd-2nd centuries BCE) ===
Early depictions of Hindu deities

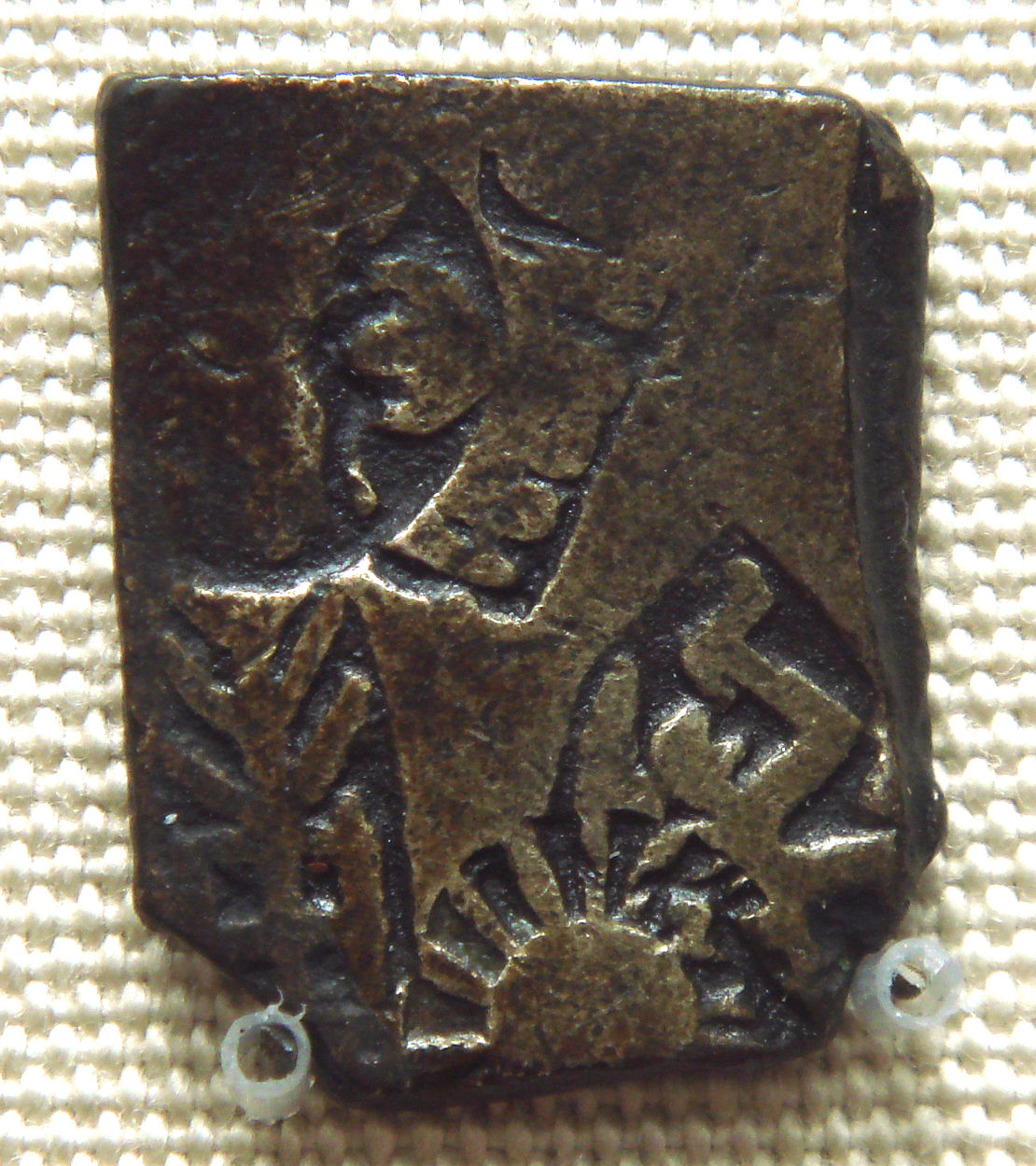
Balarama (lower right) on a Mauryan empire coin, 3rd BCE.

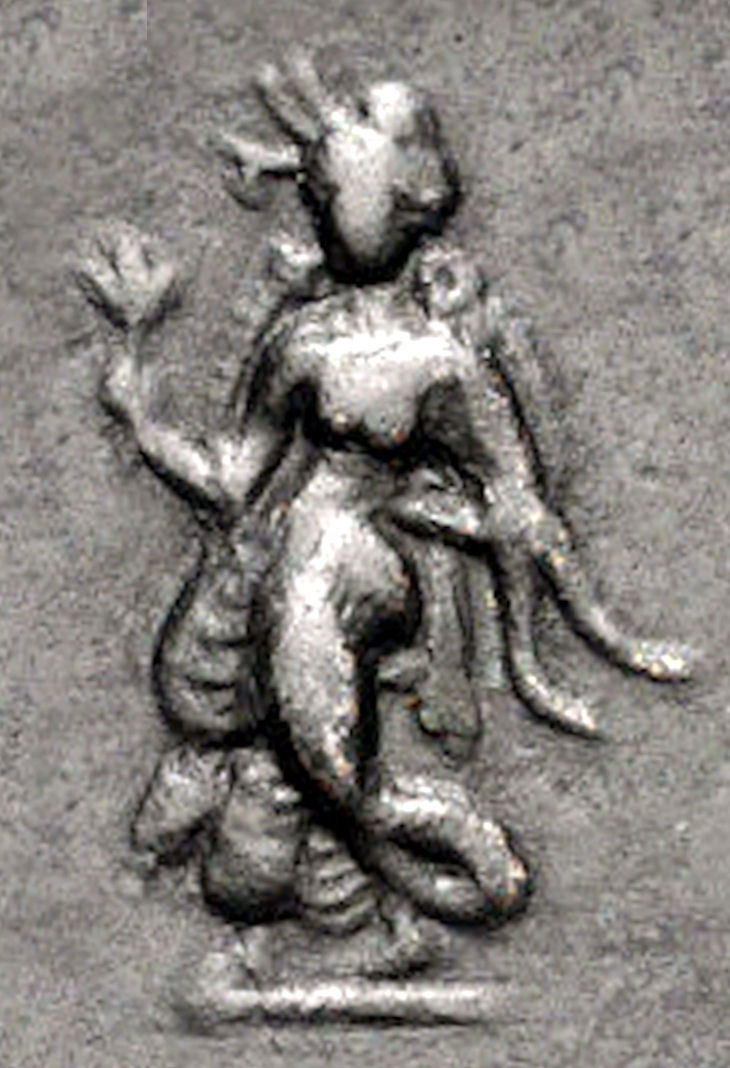
Lakshmi on a coin of Pantaleon, circa 180 BCE

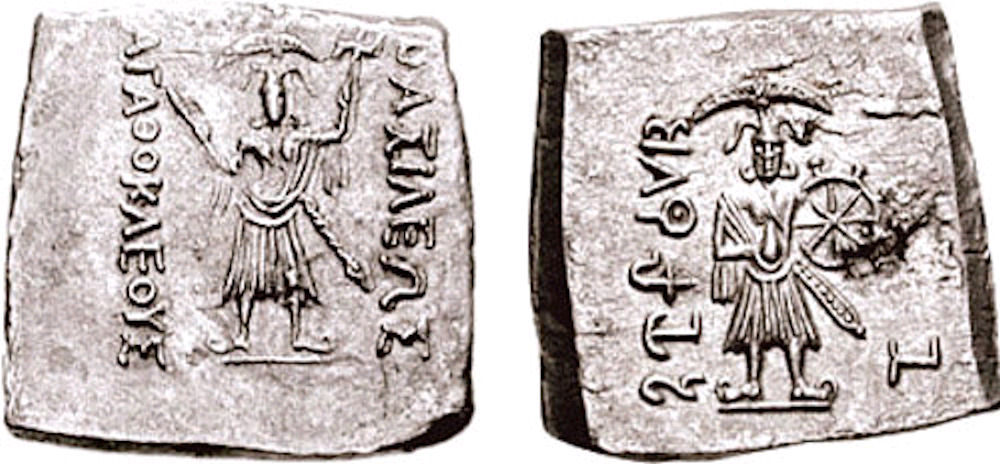
Coins of Agathocles with Hindu deities Balarama-Samkarshana and Vasudeva-Krishna, with Greek and Brahmi script, circa 180 BCE.

It is thought that before the adoption of stone sculpture, there was an older tradition of using clay or wood to represent Indian deities, which, because of their inherent fragility, have not survived.

There are no remains of such representations, but an indirect testimony appears in the some punch-marked coins of the Mauryan Empire, as well as the coinage of the Indo-Greek king Agathocles, who issued coins with the image of Indian deities, together with legends in the Brami script, circa 180-190 BCE. The deity illustrated in some of the punch-marked coins of the 3rd century BCE is now generally thought to be Balarama, with his attributes: a plough in his raised left hand and pestle in his raised right hand. Some of the first known illustrations of proto-Hindu deities appearing on Hellenistic coinage, as witnessed by the Indo-Greeks in the northwest of the Indian subcontinent, are generally identified as Balarama-Samkarshana and Vasudeva-Krishna, together with their attributes, especially the Gada mace and the plow for the former, and the Vishnu attributes of the Shankha (a pear-shaped case or conch) and the Sudarshana Chakra wheel for the latter. According to Bopearachchi, the headdress is actually a misrepresentation of a shaft with a half-moon parasol on top (chattra), as seen in later statues of bodhisattvas in Mathura. It is therefore thought that images predating the coins (but now lost) served as models to the engravers.

Early Hindu reliefs

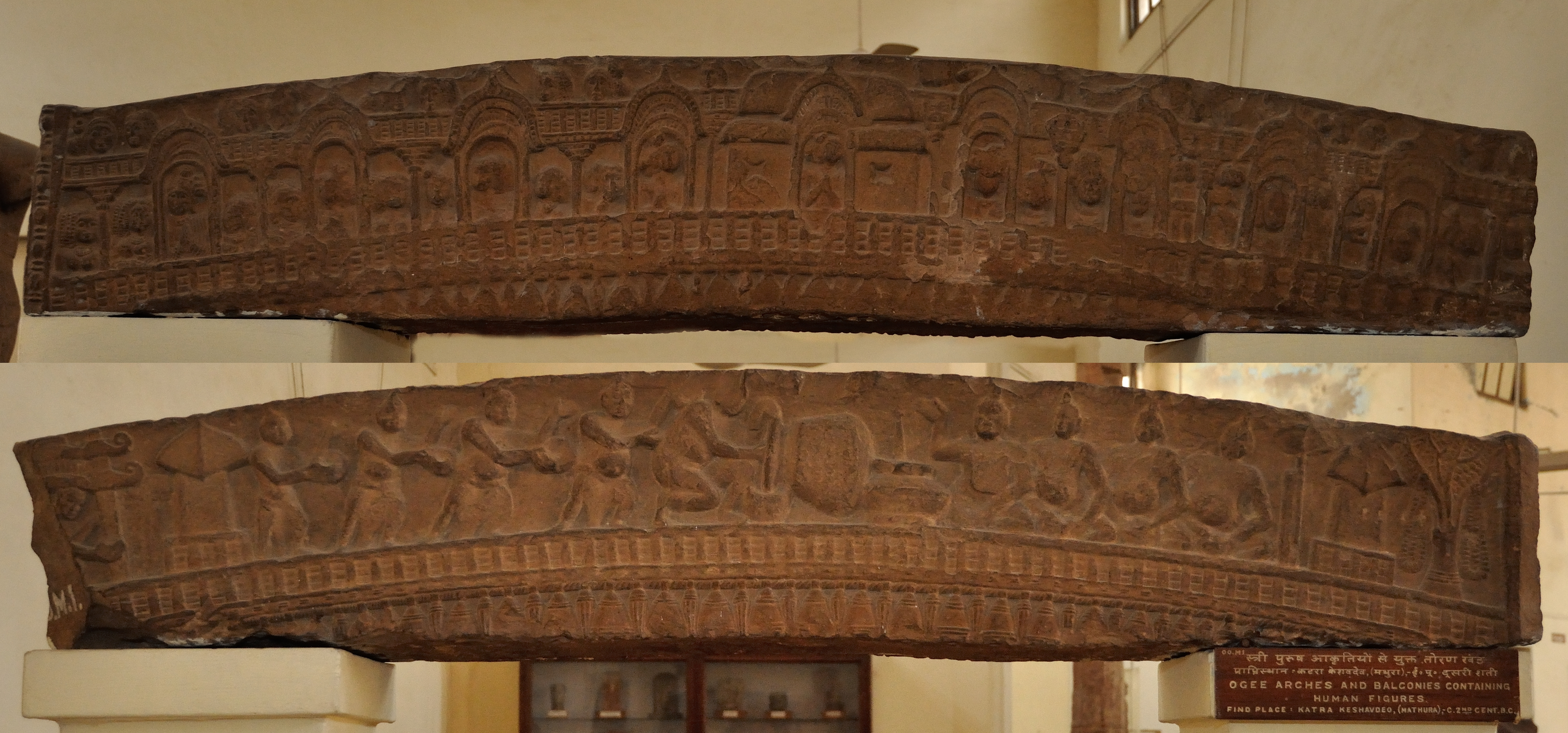
The Katra architrave, possibly representing Brahmins and the cult of the Shiva Linga, Mathura, circa 100 BCE

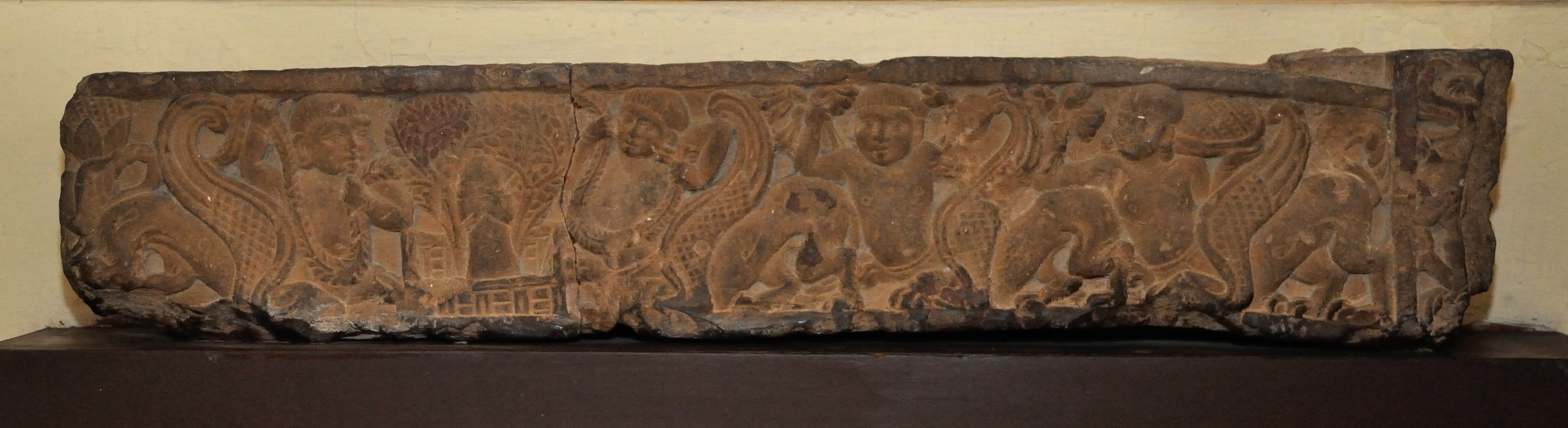
Worship of Shiva Linga by Gandharvas, 2nd-1st century BCE

The dancing girls on some of the coins of Agathocles and Pantaleon are also sometimes considered as representations of Lakshmi, the consort of Vishnu, Subhadra, the sister of Krishna and Balarama, and also Vasudhara, a goddess of abundance and fortune for Buddhists.

=== Early reliefs (1st century BCE) ===
By 100 BCE in the art of Mathura, reliefs start to represent more complex scenes, defining, according to Sonya Rhie Quintanilla, an age of "iconic diversification and narrative maturation." Some reliefs, such as the "Katra architrave," may represent Brahmins and the cult of the Shiva Linga. These reliefs from Mathura are dated to circa 100 BCE. Although few remain, some are considered as refined and intricate as the Buddhist narrative reliefs of Bharhut, Sanchi or Amaravati.

=== Hindu art under the Kushans (2nd-3rd century CE) ===
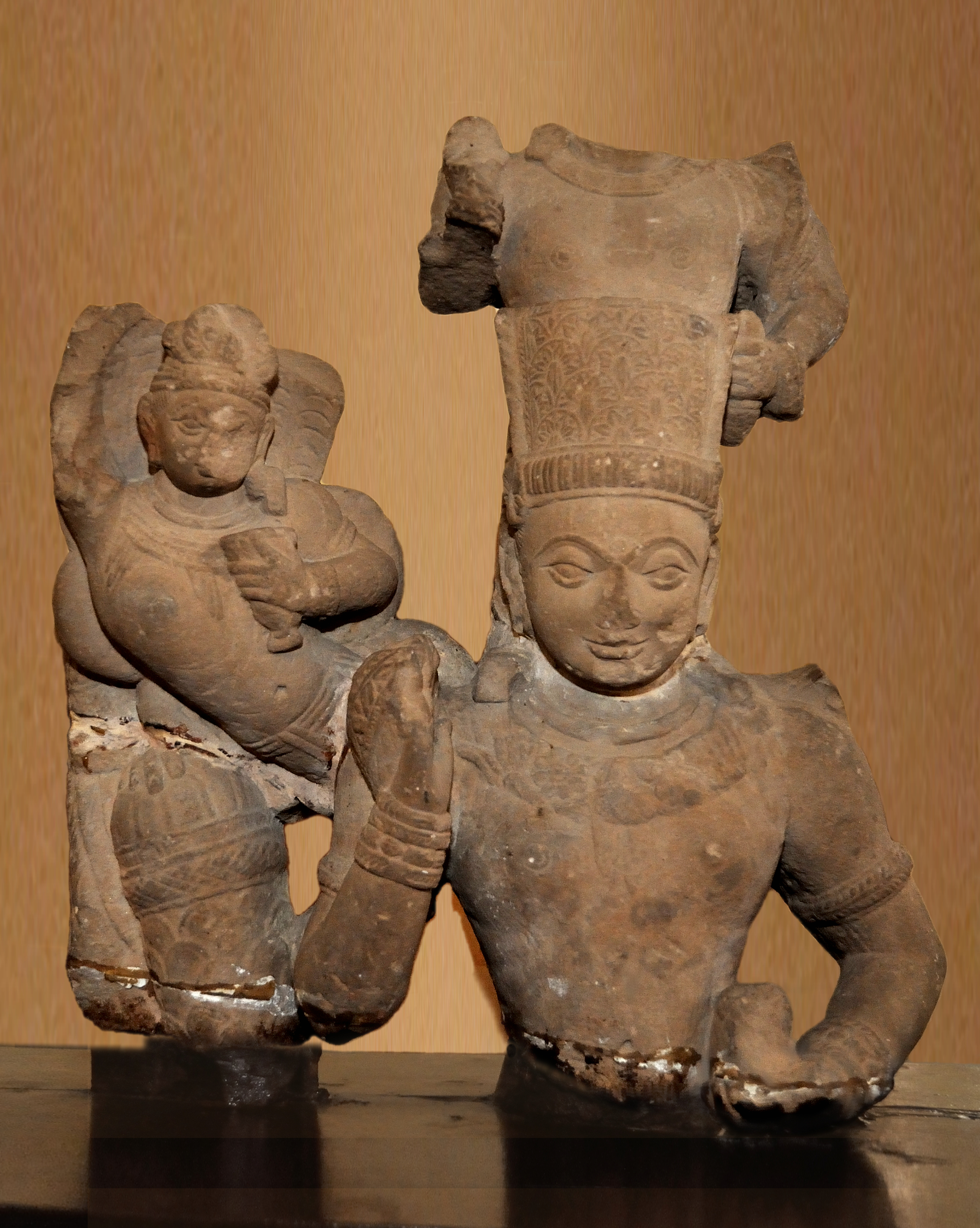
The Caturvyūha Viṣṇu: Vāsudeva and other members of the Vrishni clan. Vāsudeva (avatar of Vishnu) is fittingly in the center with his heavy decorated mace on the side and holding a conch, his elder brother Balarama to his right under a serpent hood, his son Pradyumna to his left (lost), and his grandson Aniruddha on top. 2nd century CE, Mathura Museum.

What we call "Hindu art" started to develop fully from the 1st to the 2nd century CE, and there are only very few examples of artistic representation before that time. Hindu art was inspired by the earlier Buddhist art of Mathura. The three Vedic gods Indra, Brahma and Surya were first depicted in Buddhist sculpture as attendants in scenes commemorating the life of the Buddha, such as his birth, his descent from the Trāyastriṃśa Heaven, or his retreat in the Indrasala Cave. During the time of the Kushans, Hindu art progressively incorporated a profusion of original Hindu stylistic and symbolic elements, in contrast with the general balance and simplicity of Buddhist art. The differences appear in iconography rather than in style. It is generally considered that it is in Mathura, during the time of the Kushans, that the Brahmanical deities were given their standard form:

"To a great extent it is in the visual rendering of the various gods and goddesses of theistic Brahmanism that the Mathura artist displayed his ingenuity and inventiveness at their best. Along with almost all the major cult icons Visnu, Siva, Surya, Sakti and Ganapati, a number of subsidiary deities of the faith were given tangible form in Indian art here for the first time in an organized manner. In view of this and for the variety and multiplicity of devotional images then made, the history of Mathura during the first three centuries of the Christian era, which coincided with the rule of the Kusanas, can very well be called revolutionary in the development of Brahmanical sculpture."

— Pran Gopal Paul and Debjani Paul, in Brahmanical Imagery in the Kuṣāṇa Art of Mathurā: Tradition and Innovations

Some sculptures during this period suggest that the concept of the avatar was starting to emerge, as images of "Chatur-vyuha" (the four emanations of Vishnu) are appearing. The famous "Caturvyūha Viṣṇu" statue in Mathura Museum is an attempt to show in one composition Vāsudeva (as an avatar of Vishnu) together with the other members of the Vrishni clan of the Pancharatra system: Samkarsana, Pradyumna and Aniruddha, with Samba missing, Vāsudeva being the central deity from whom the others emanate. The back of the relief is carved with the branches of a Kadamba tree, symbolically showing the relationship being the different deities. The depiction of Vishnu was stylistically derived from the type of the ornate Bodhisattvas, with rich jewelry and ornate headdress.

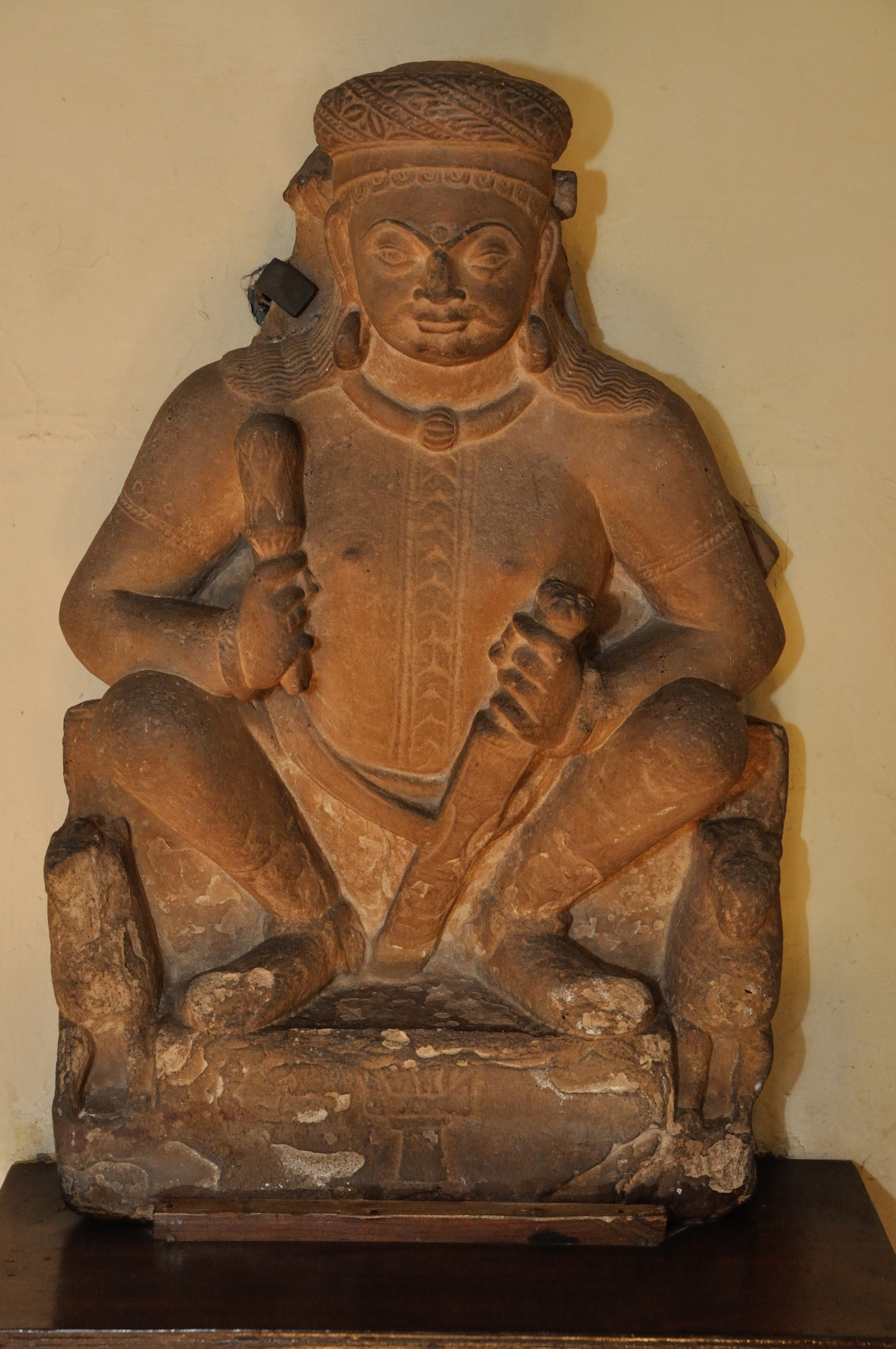
Sun God Surya, also revered in Buddhism, Kushan Period

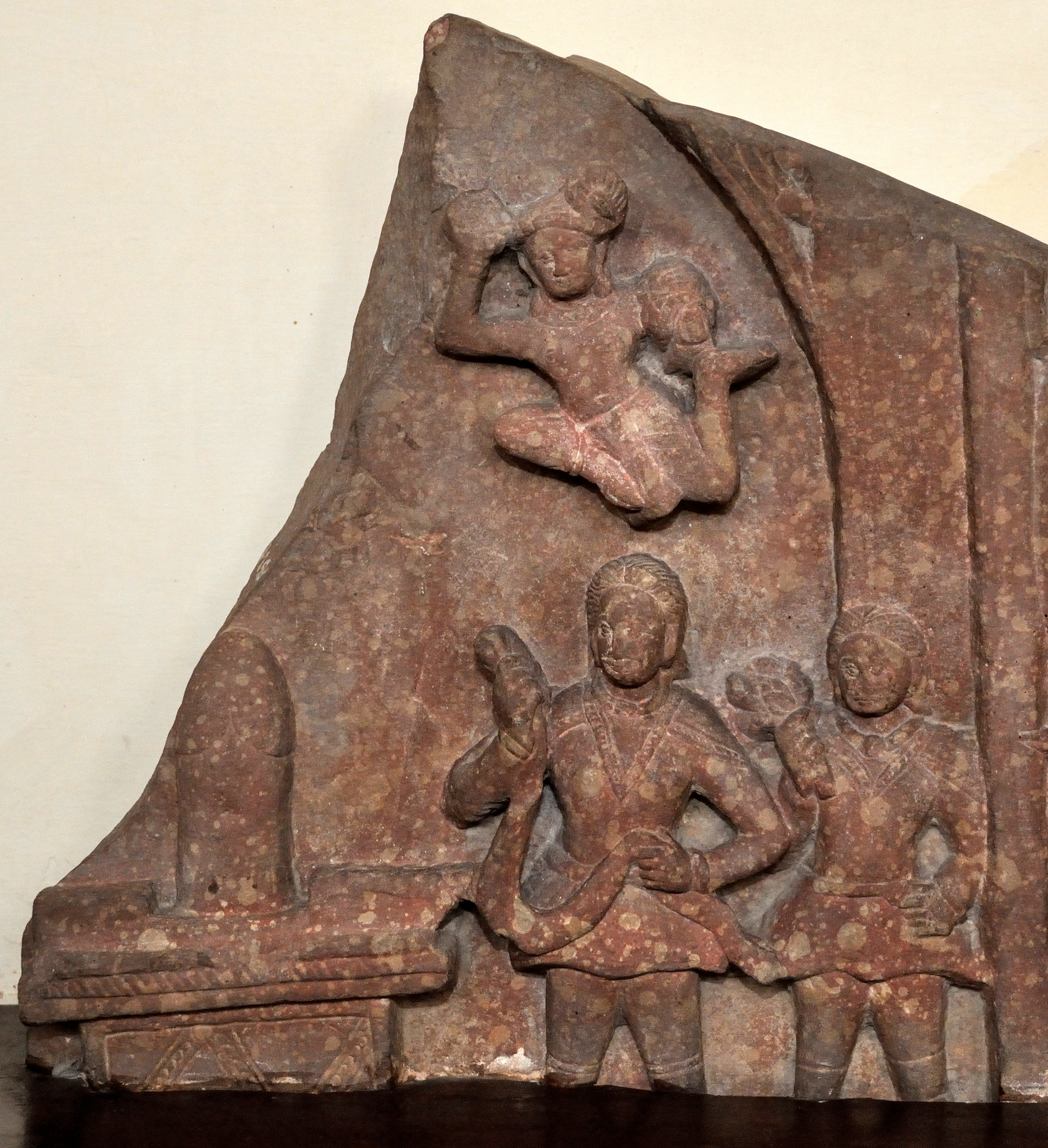
Shiva Linga worshipped by Indo-Scythian, or Kushan devotees, 2nd century CE

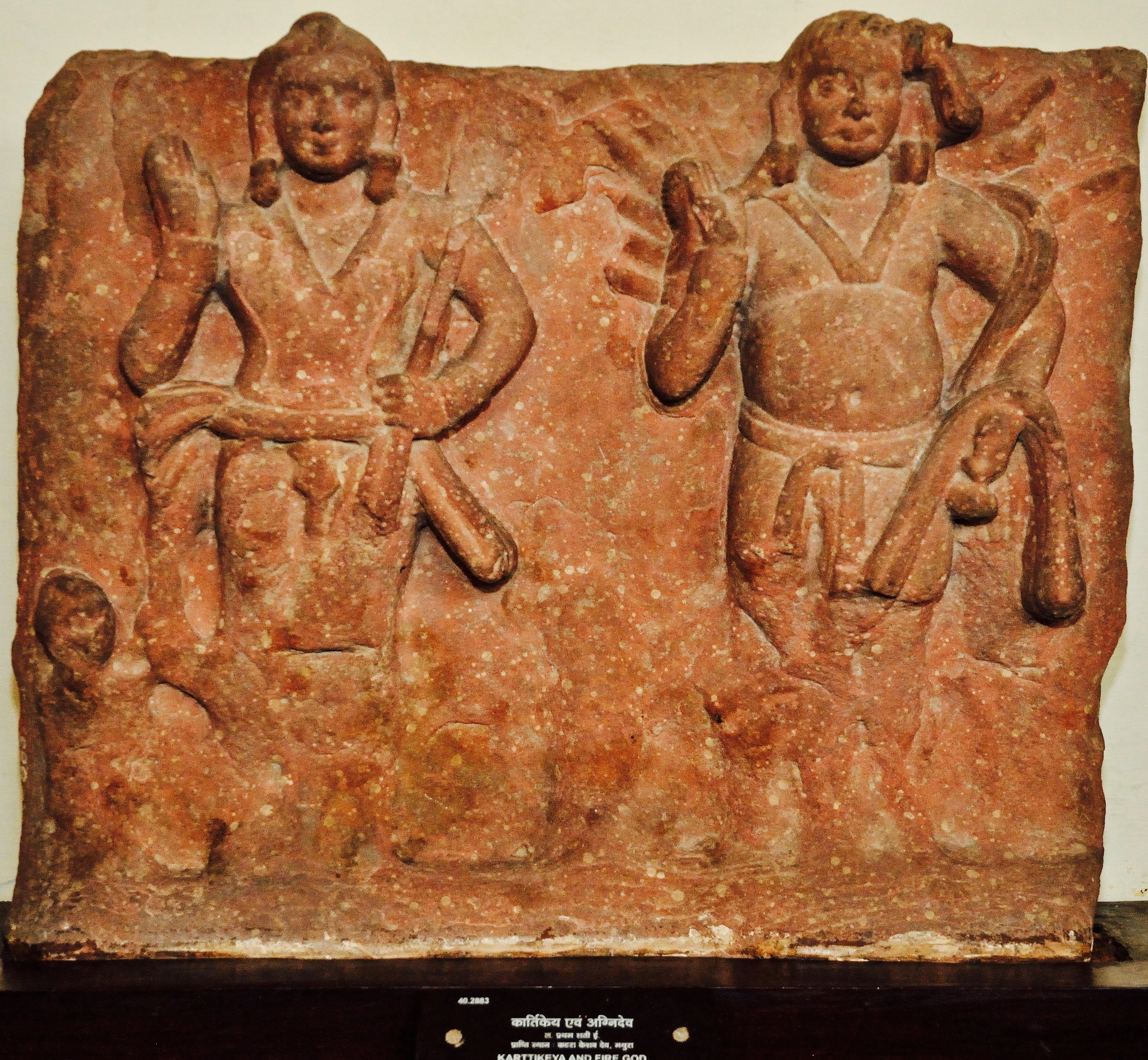
War God Karttikeya and Fire God Agni, Kushan Period, 1st century CE

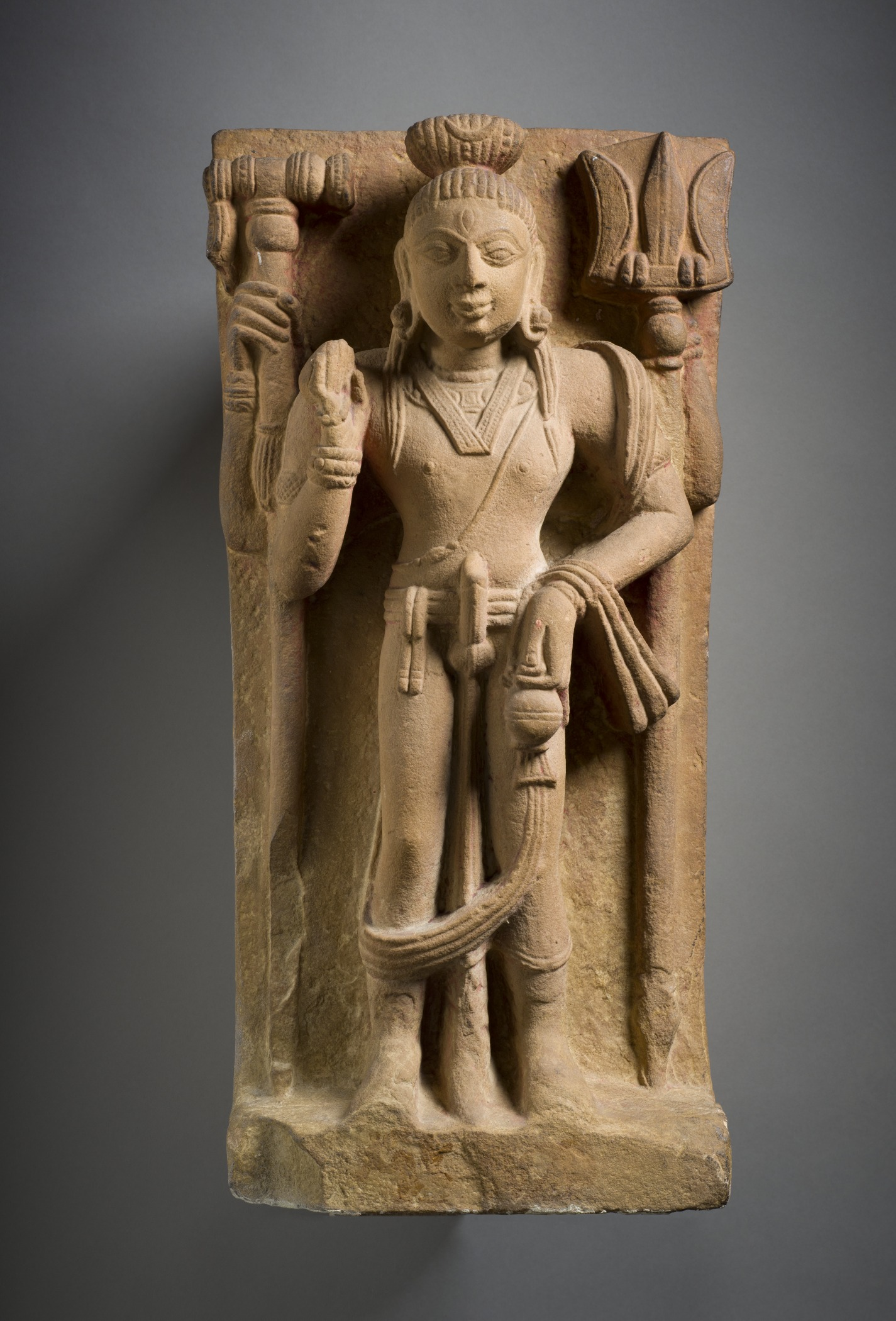
The Hindu God Shiva, 3rd century CE. Mathura or Ahichchhatra

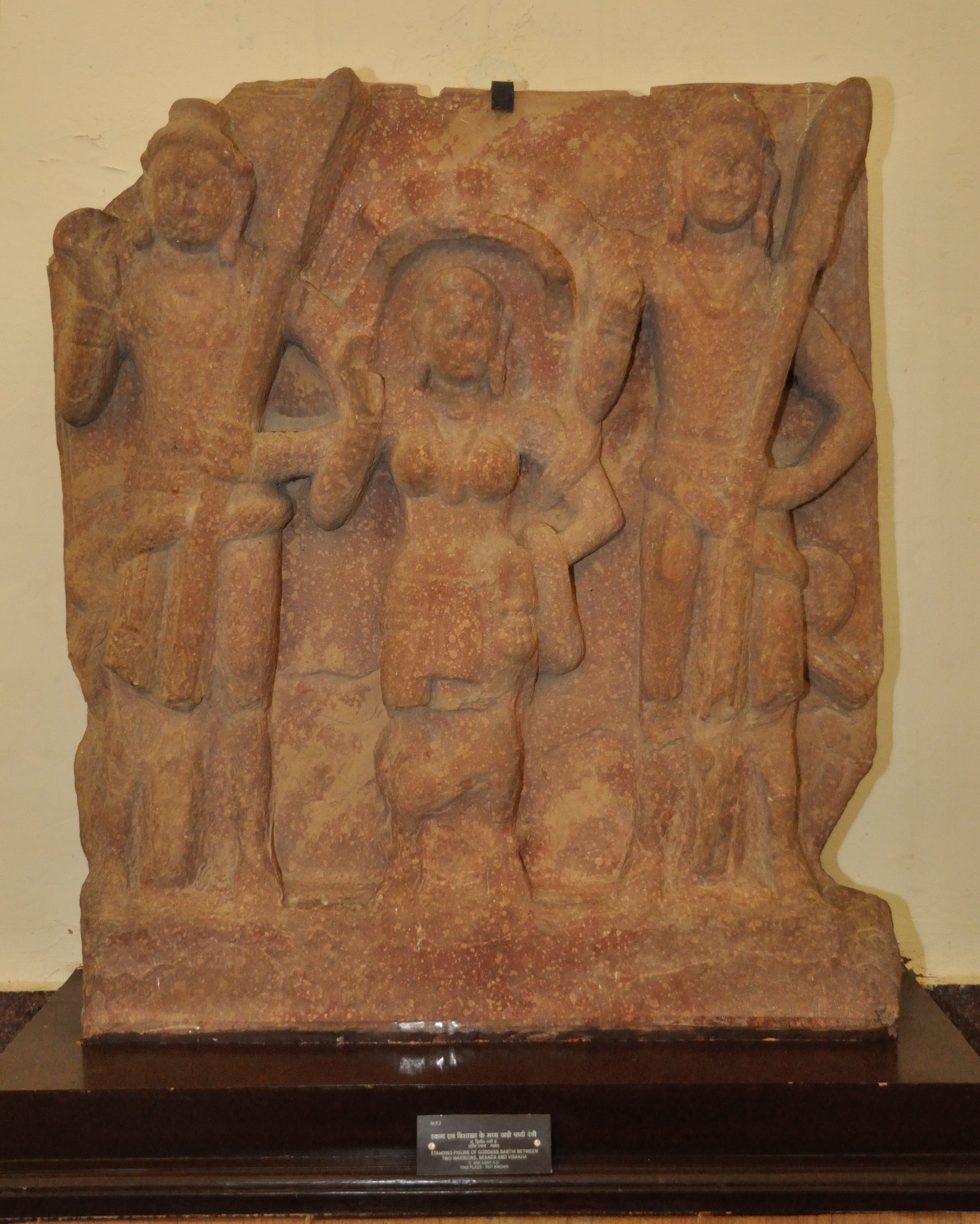
Kushan-era image of Shashthi between Skanda and Vishakha, c. 2nd century CE

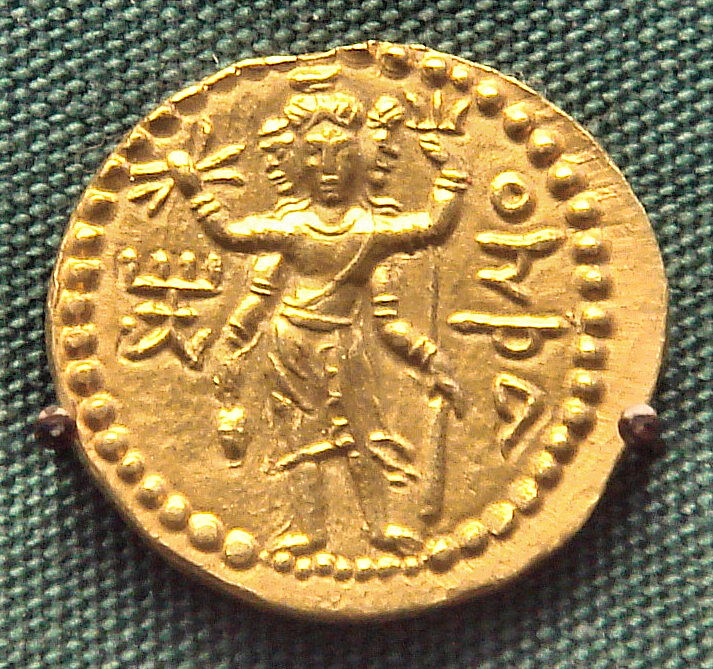
Three-faced Oesho, often identified with Shiva, on a coin of Huvishka

=== Hindu art under the Guptas (4th-6th century CE) ===
Iconography of Vishnu
(5th century CE)

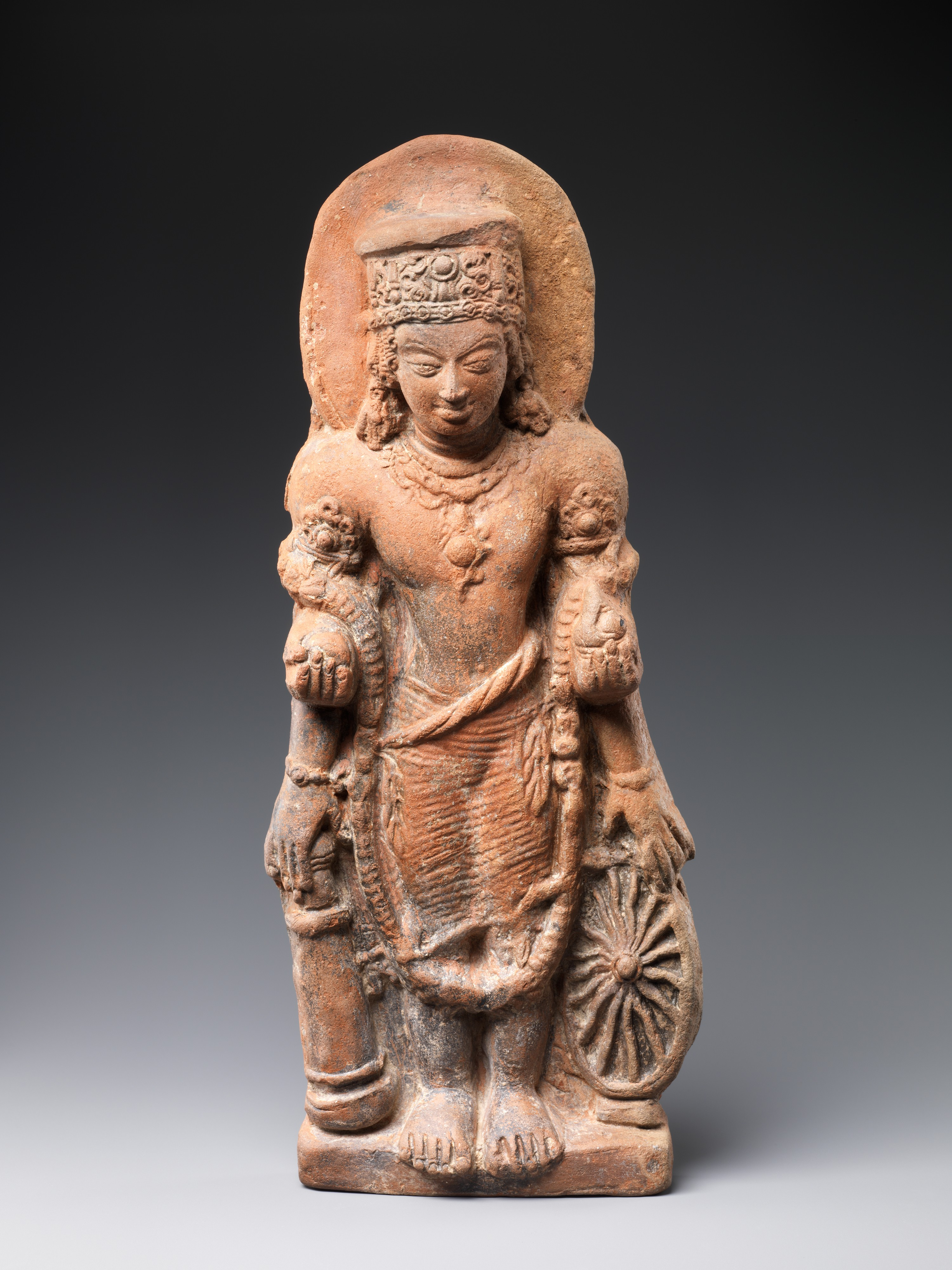
A terracotta statue of Vishnu Caturanana ("Four-Armed"), using the attributes of Vāsudeva-Krishna, with the addition of an aureole around the head (5th century CE). Uttar Pradesh.

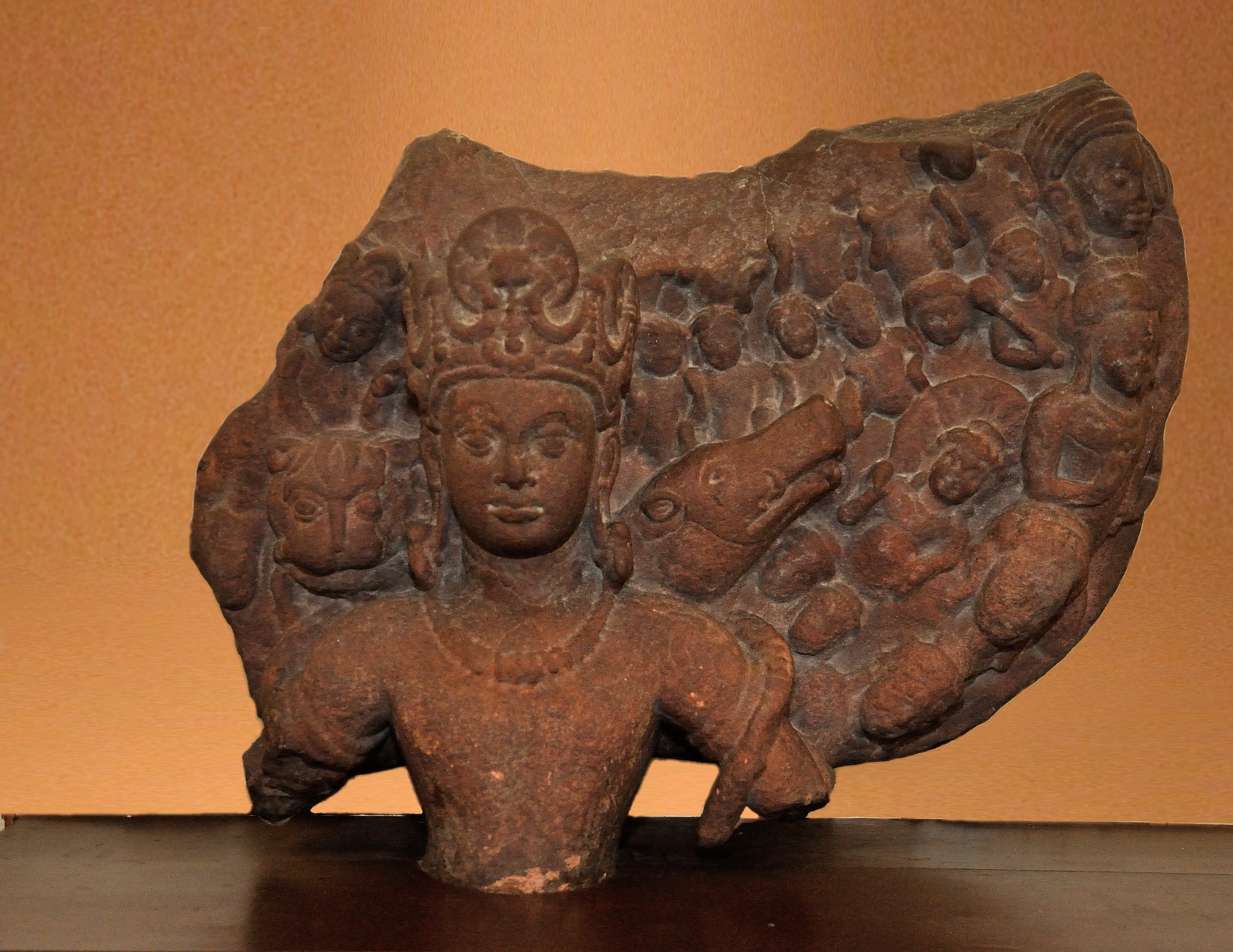
Visnu Visvarupa: Vishnu as three-headed cosmic creator, showing Vishnu with a human head, flanked by his avatars (the head of a lion for Narasimha, the muzzle of a boar for Varaha) with a multitude of beings on his aureole, symbol of the emanations resulting from his creative power. 5th century CE, Mathura.

The first known creation of the Guptas related to Hindu art at Mathura is an inscribed pillar recording the installation of two Shiva Lingas in 380 CE under Chandragupta II, Samudragupta's successor.

==== Development of the iconography of Vishnu ====
Until the 4th century CE, the worship of Vāsudeva-Krishna seems to have been much more important than that of Vishnu. During the Gupta period, statues focusing on the worship of Vishnu start to appear, replacing earlier statues now attributed to Vāsudeva-Krishna. Many of the statues of Vishnu appearing from the 4th century CE, such as the Vishnu Caturanana ("Four-Armed"), use the attributes and the iconography of Vāsudeva-Krishna, but add an aureole starting at the shoulders.

Other statues of Vishnu show him as three-headed (with an implied fourth head in the back): the Visnu Vaikuntha Chaturmurti or Chaturvyuha ("Four-Emanations") type, where Vishnu has a human head, flanked by the muzzle of a boar (his avatar Varaha) and the head of a lion (his avatar Narasimha), two of his most important and ancient avatars, laid out upon his aureole. Recent scholarship considers that these "Vishnu" statues still show the emanation Vāsudeva Krishna as the central human-shaped deity, rather than the Supreme God Vishnu himself.

A further variation is Vishnu as three-headed cosmic creator, the Visnu Visvarupa, showing Vishnu with a human head, again flanked by the muzzle of a boar the head of a lion, but with a multitude of beings on his aureole, symbol of the numerous creations and emanations resulting from his creative power. These sculptures can be dated to the 5th century CE.

==== Incorporation of Lakshmi ====
In the 3rd-4th century CE, Lakshmi, which had been an independent Goddess of prosperity and luck, was incorporated in the Vaishnava pantheon as the consort of Vishnu. She thus became the Hindu goddess of wealth, good fortune, prosperity and beauty.

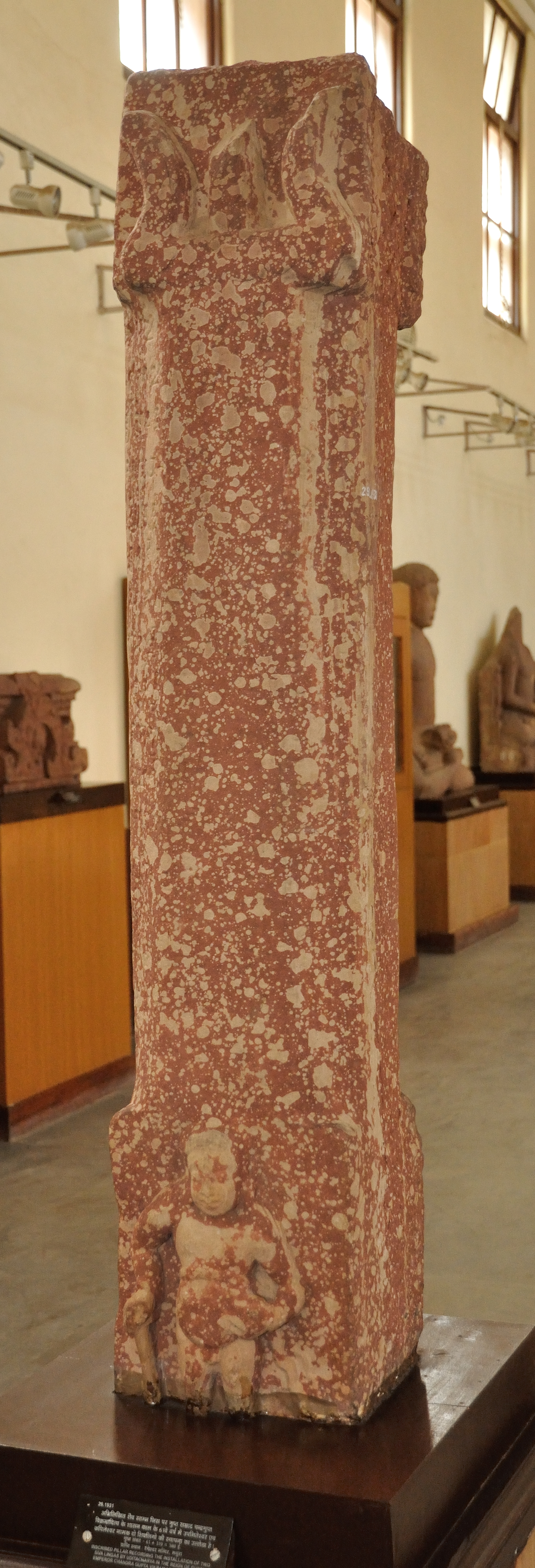
Pillar recording the installation of Shiva Lingas in the "year 61" (380 CE) during the rule of Chandragupta II.

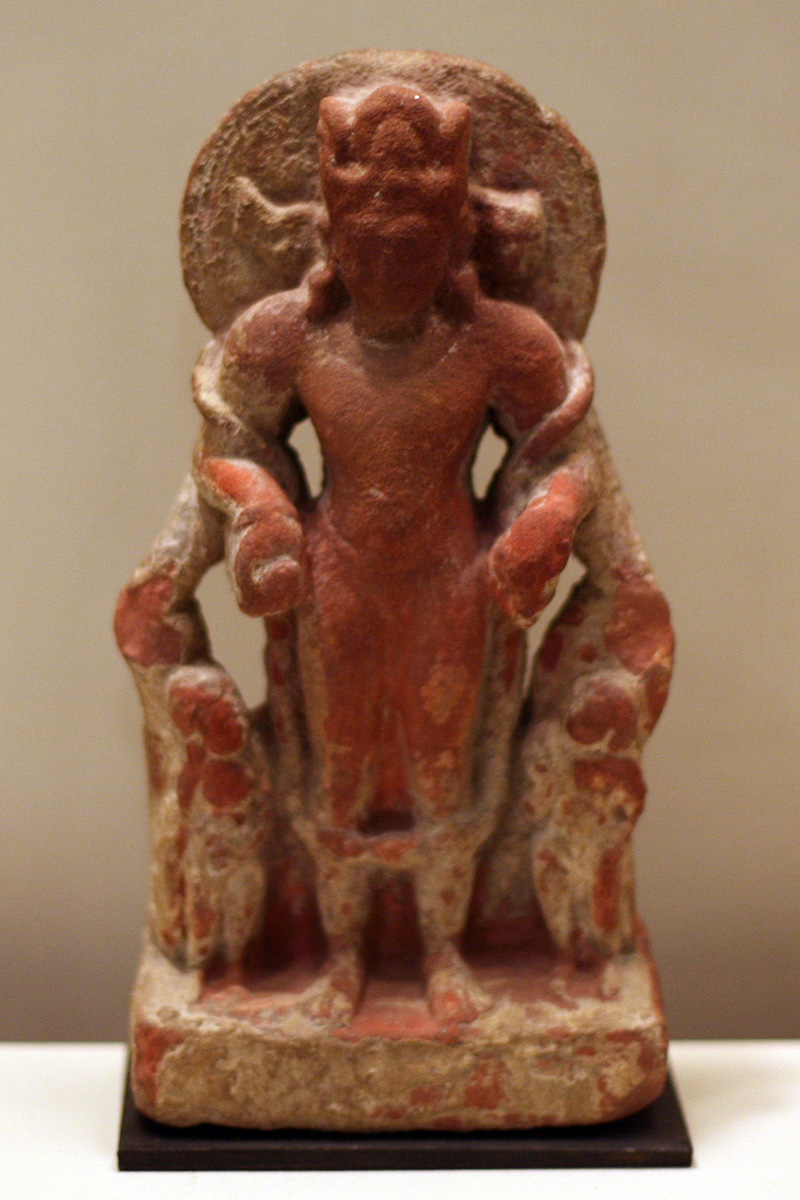
Four-faced Vishnu Chaturvyuha ("Four-Emanations"), 4th-5th century, Mathura

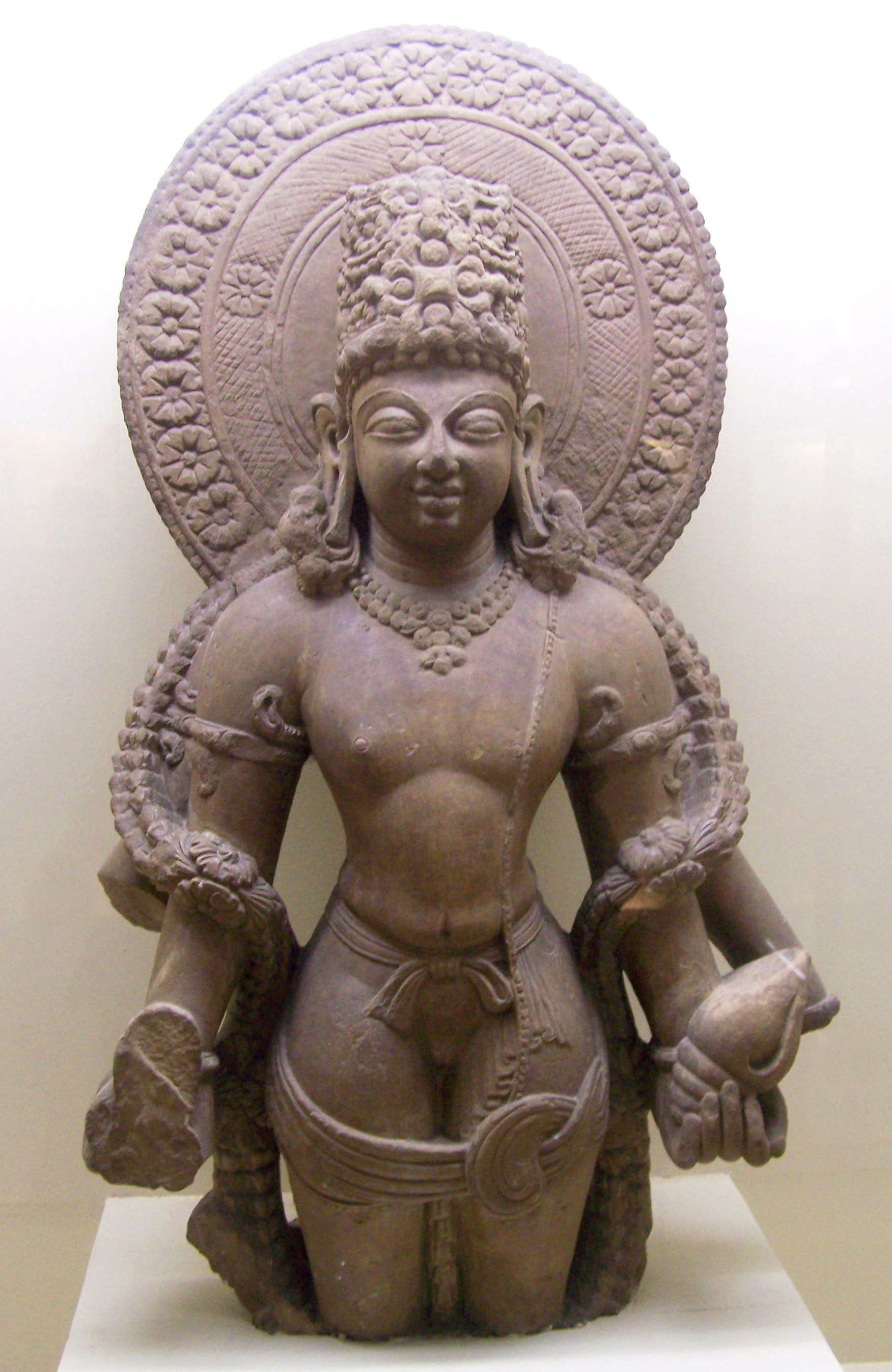
Vishnu Caturanana ("Four-Armed"), 5th century, Mathura

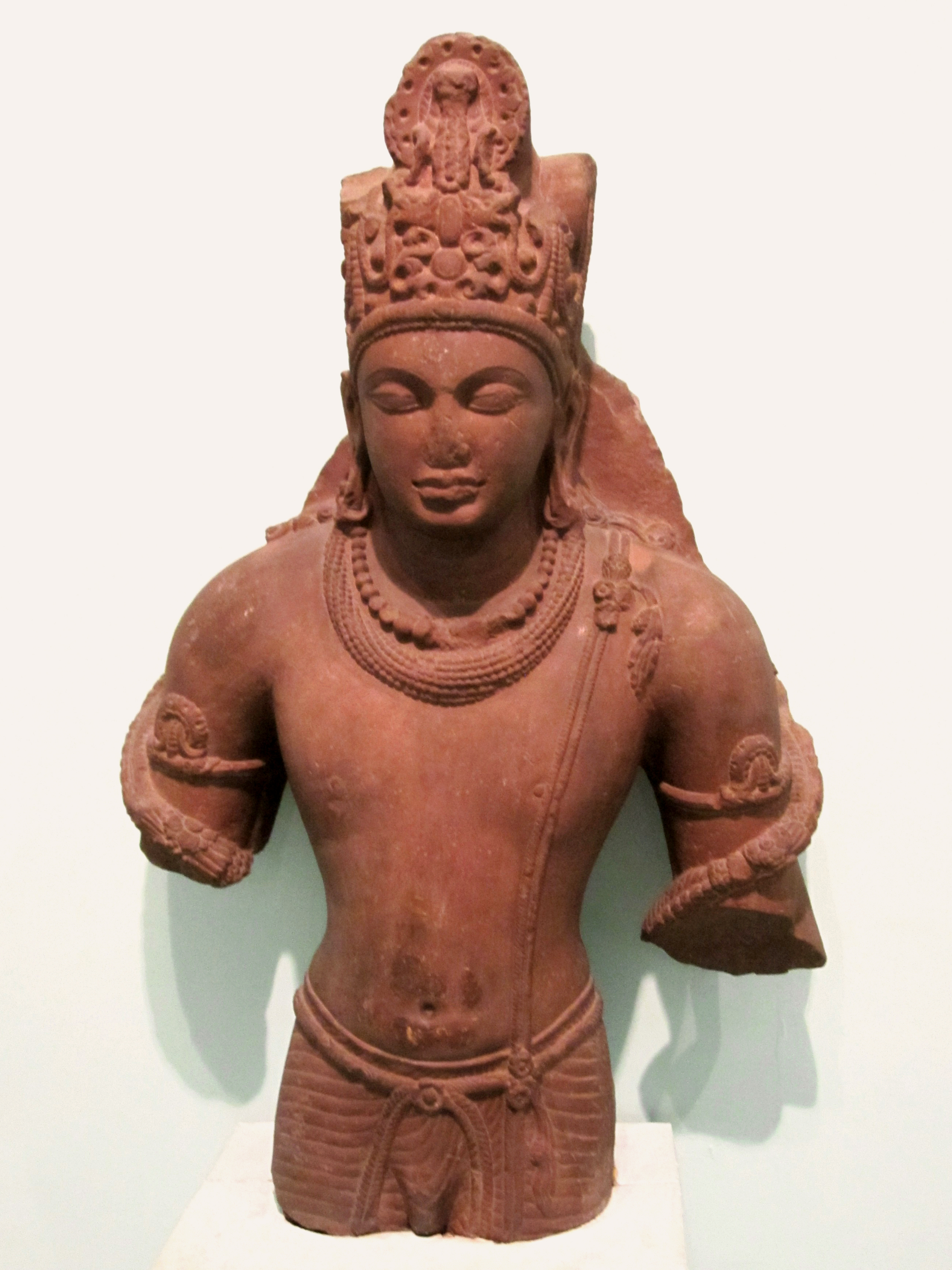
Vishnu statue, 5th century, Mathura.

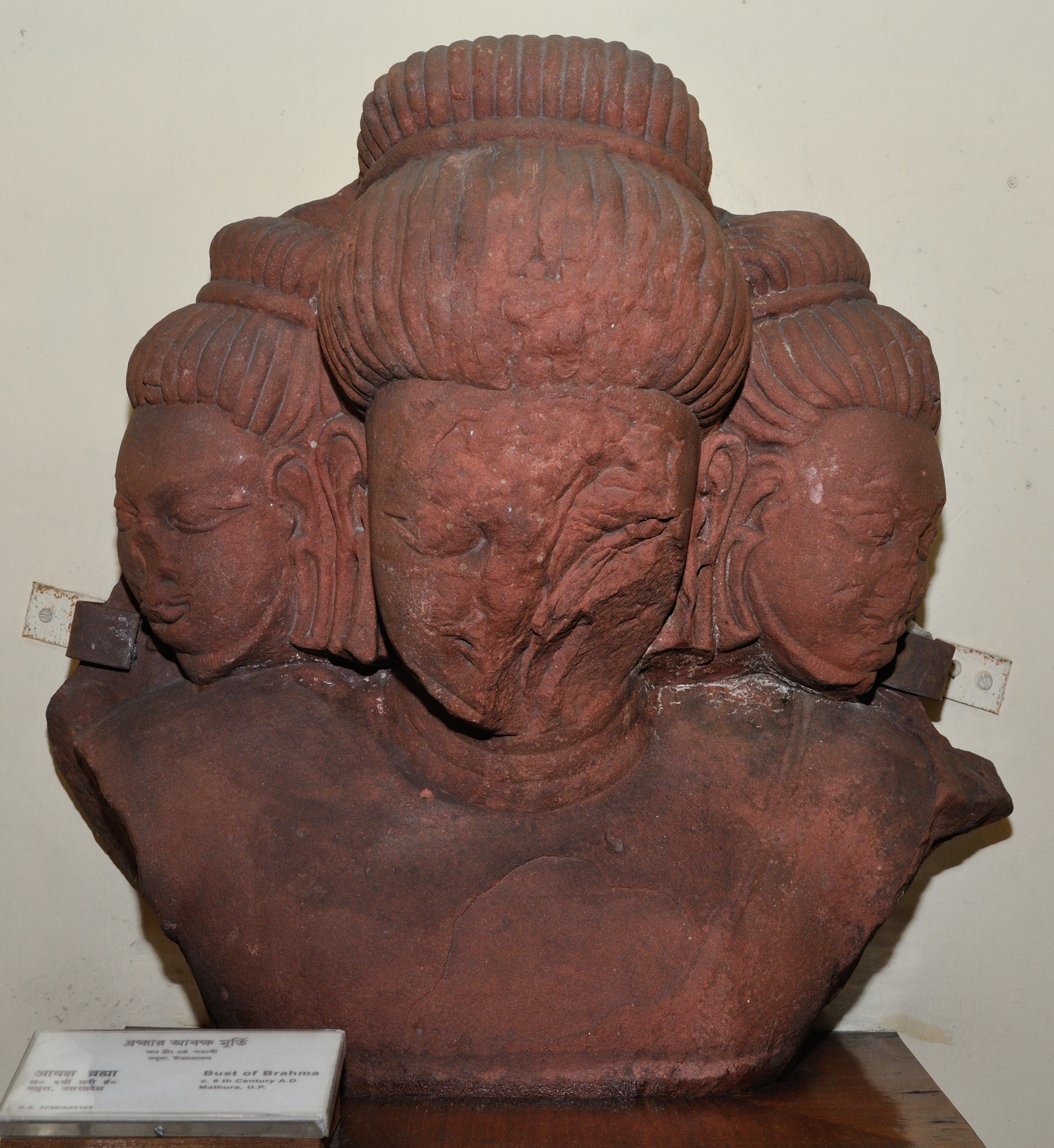
Bust of Brahma, Circa 6th Century CE

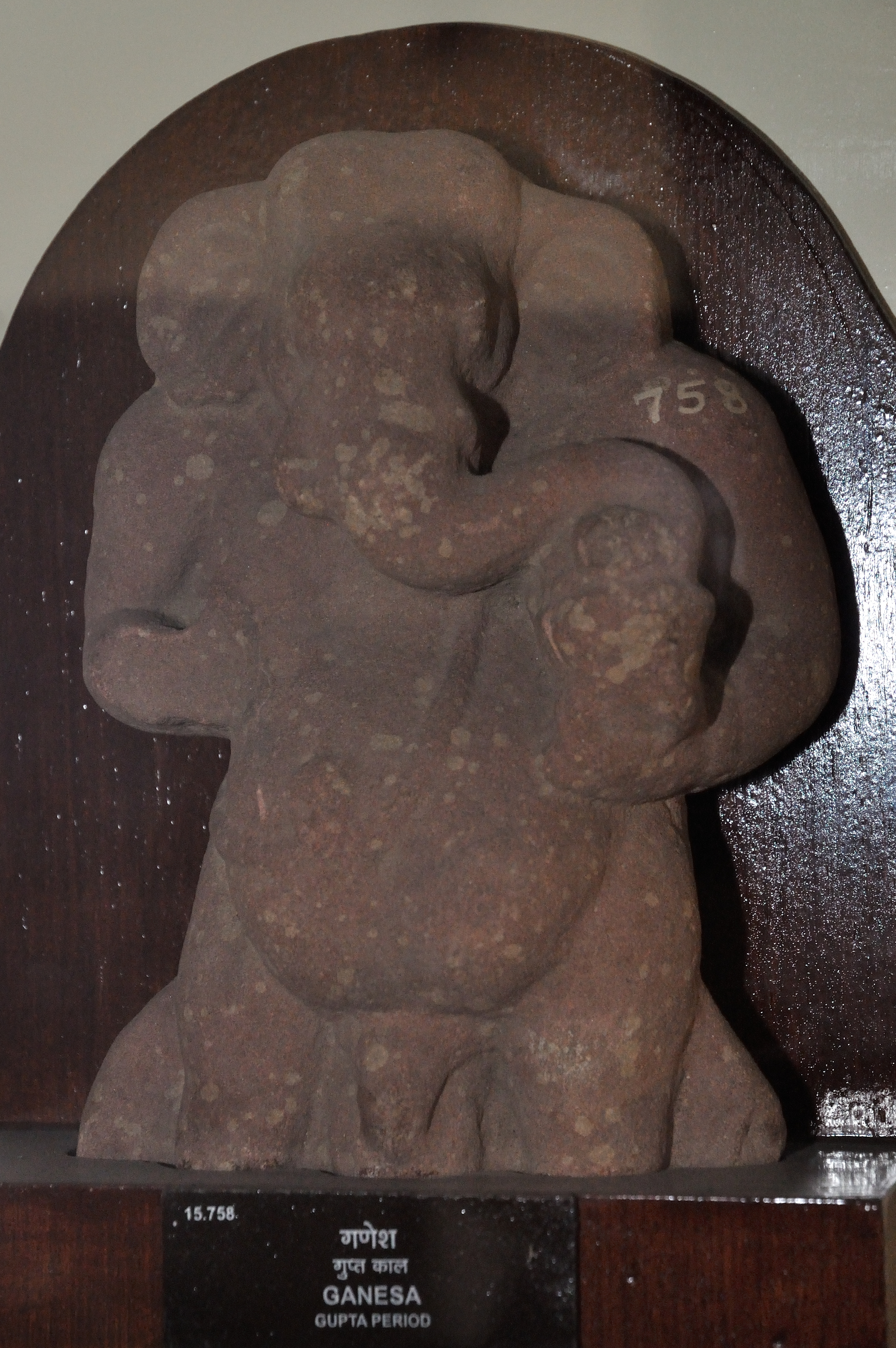
Ganesha, Gupta Period, Mathura

=== Medieval period (8th-16th century) ===
Hindu art became largely prevalent from the Medieval period onward. It was accompanied by the decline of Buddhism in the Indian subcontinent.

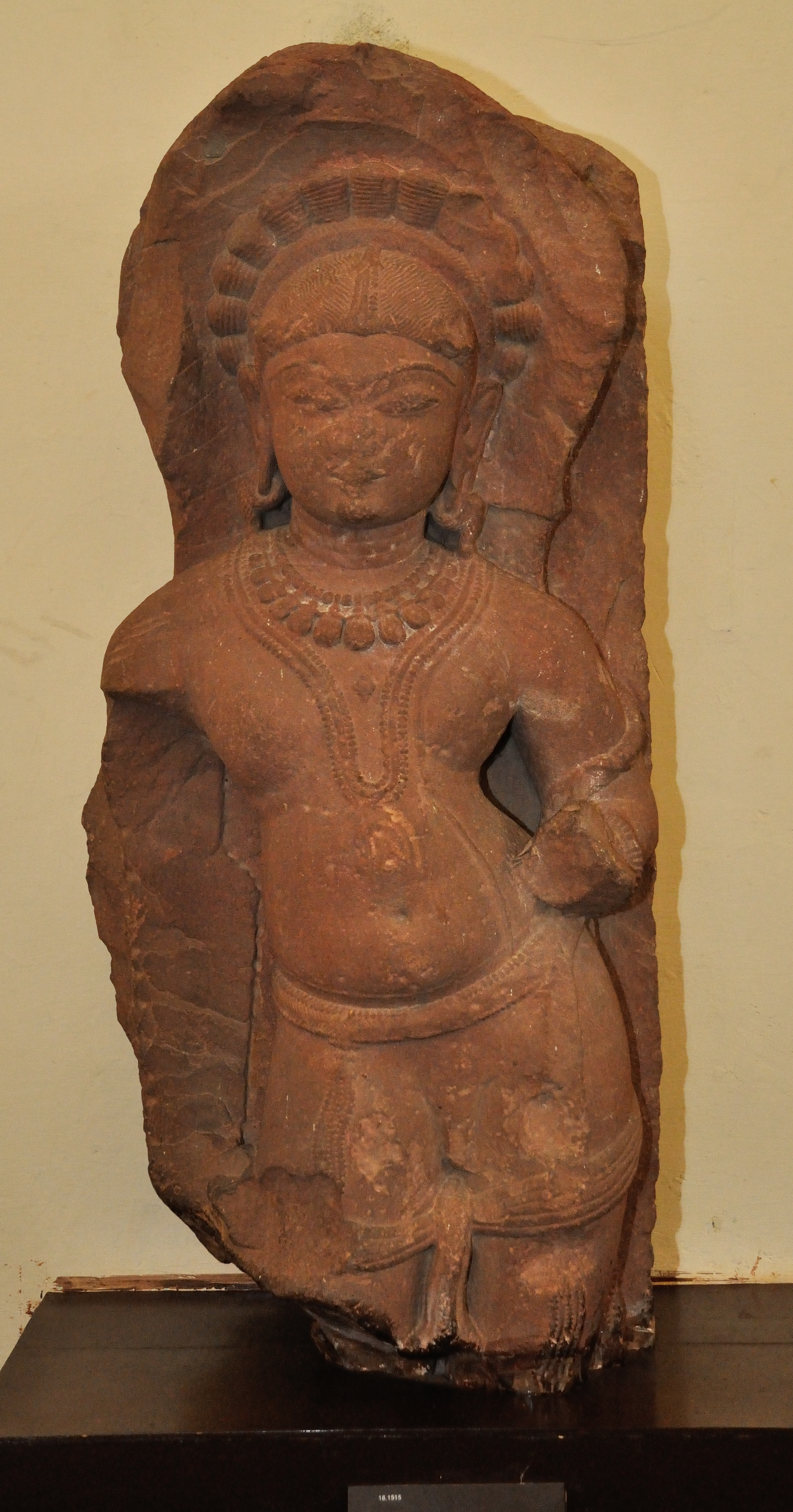
Balarama from Mathura, Early Medieval period (8th-13th century CE).

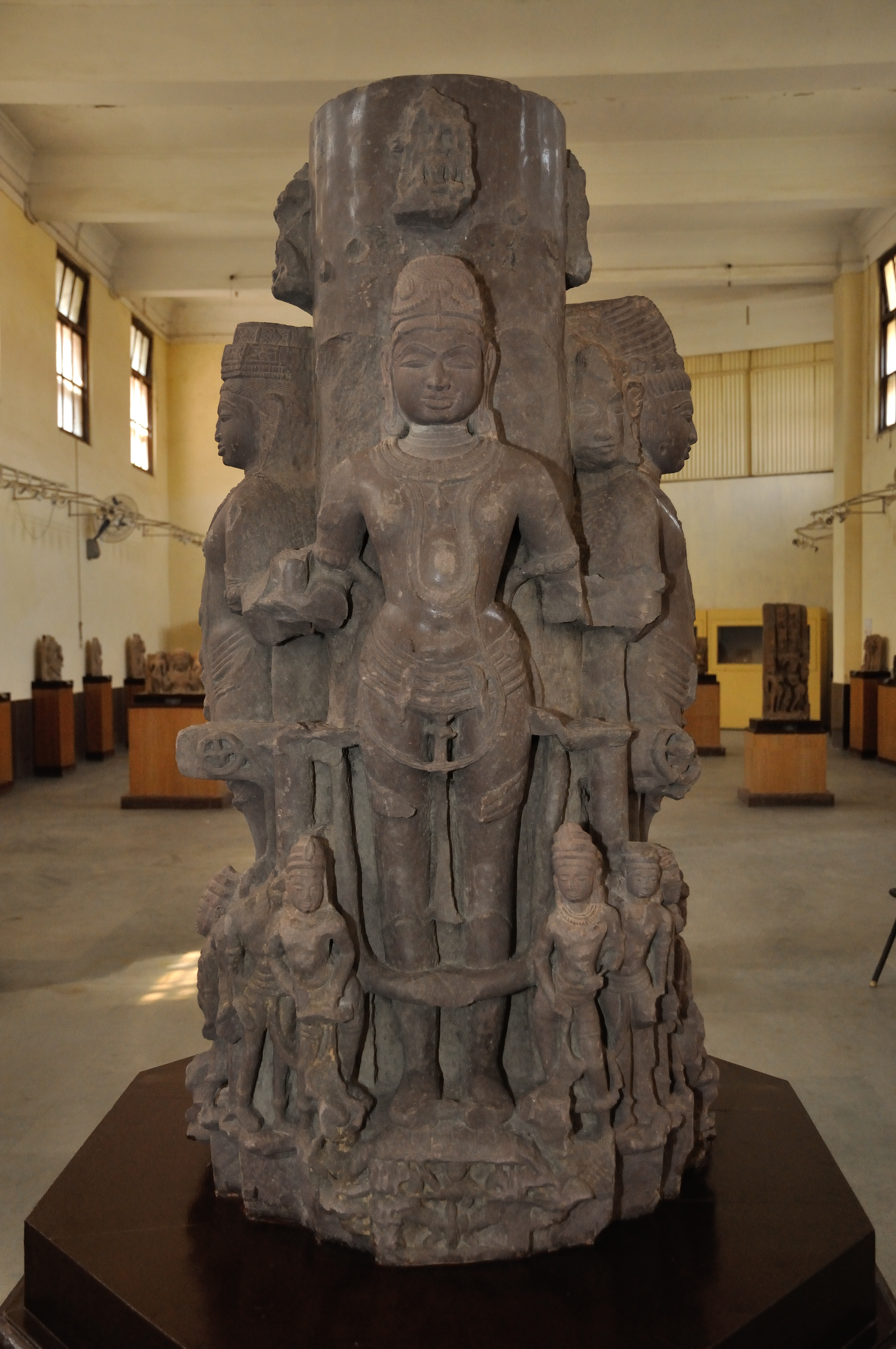
Sarvatobhadra Shiva Linga representing Brahma, Vishnu, Maheshwar and Surya, circa 9th century CE

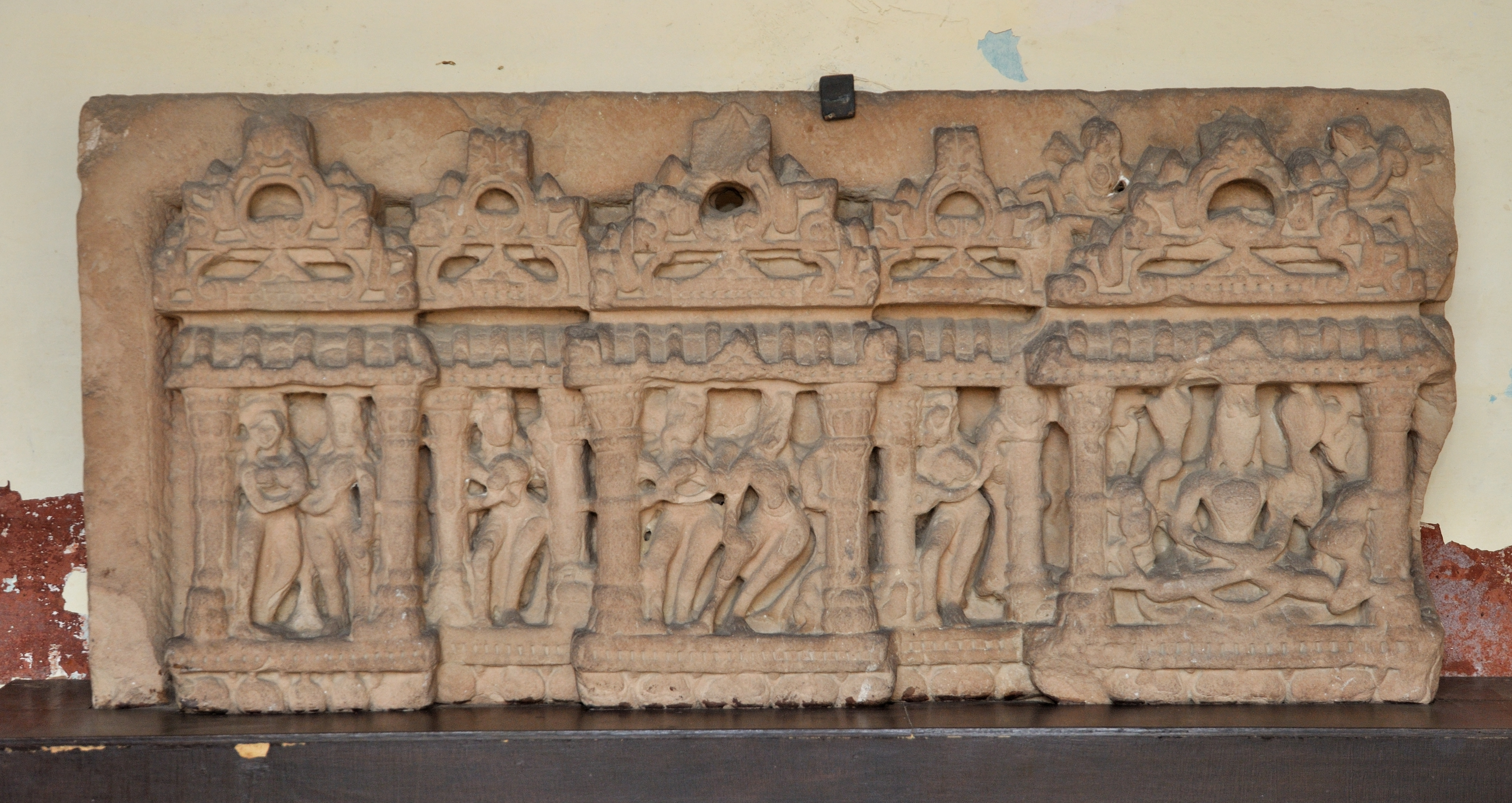
Architectural fragment with divine figures, circa 10th century CE

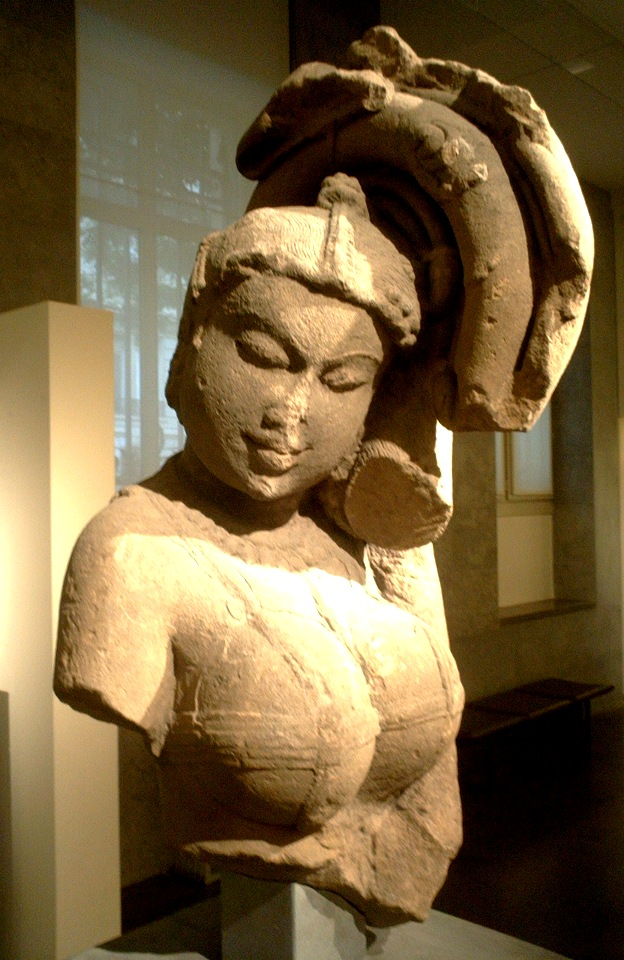
A yakshin, 10th century, Mathura, India. Guimet Museum.

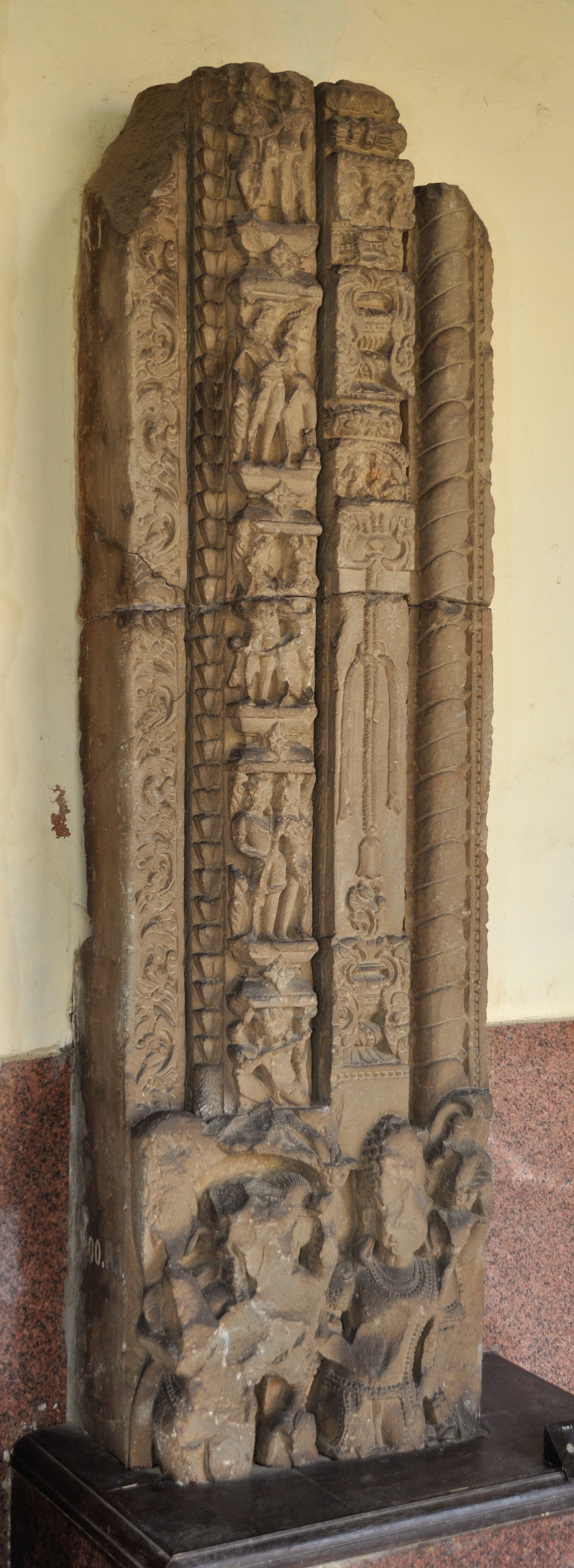
Decorative door jamb – Medieval period

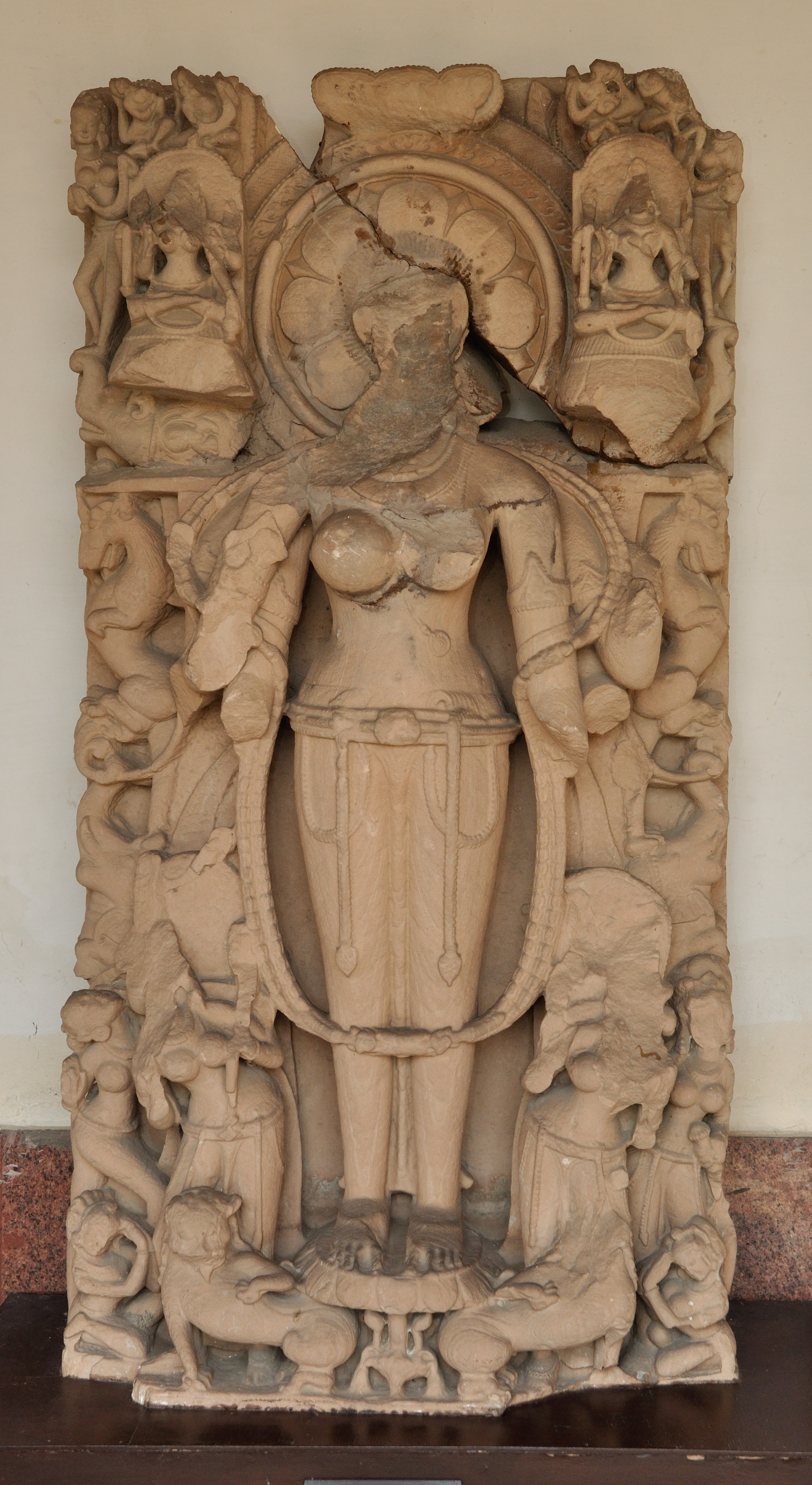
Durga, Medieval period

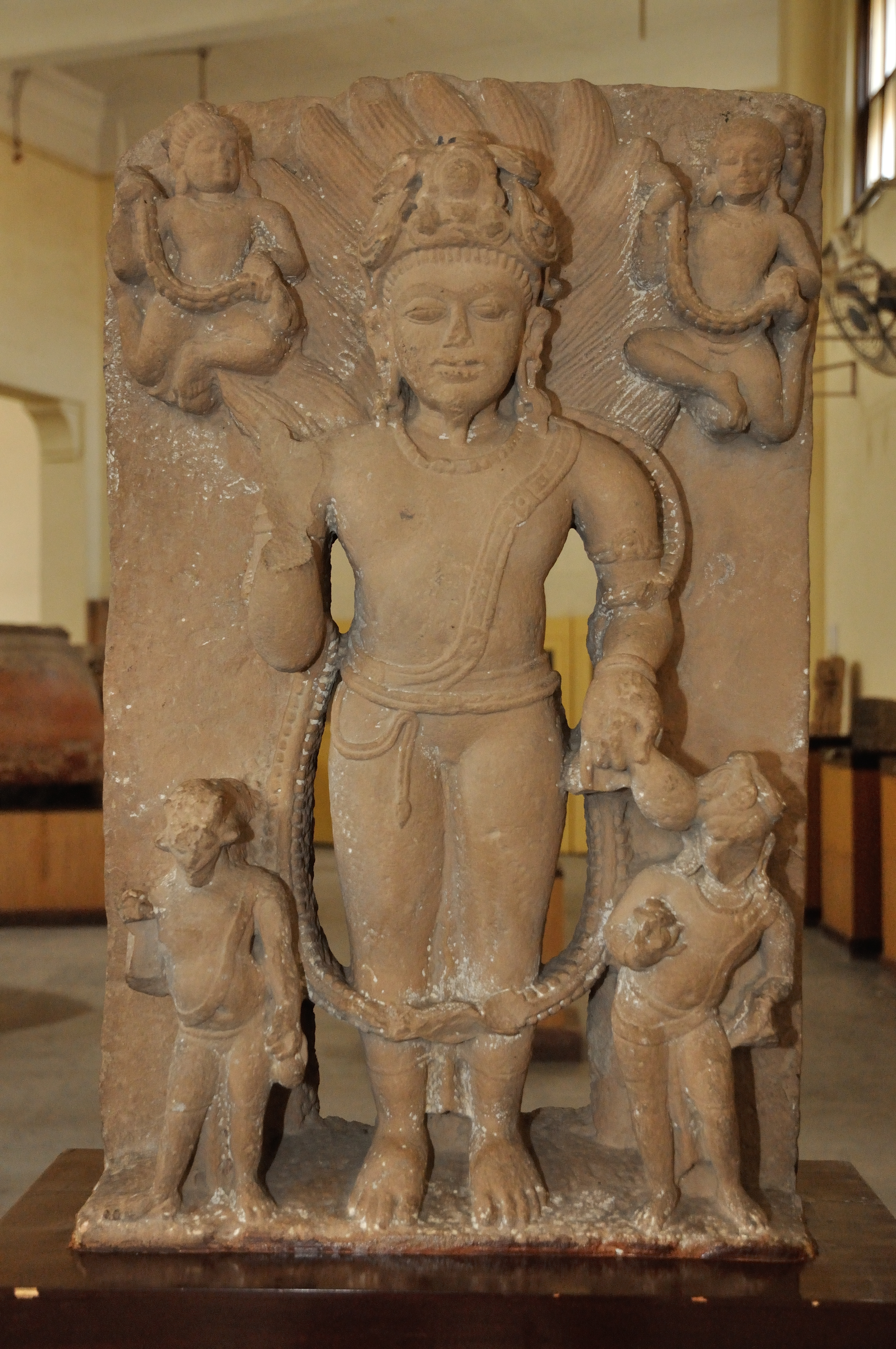
Fire God, possibly Agni, Medieval period

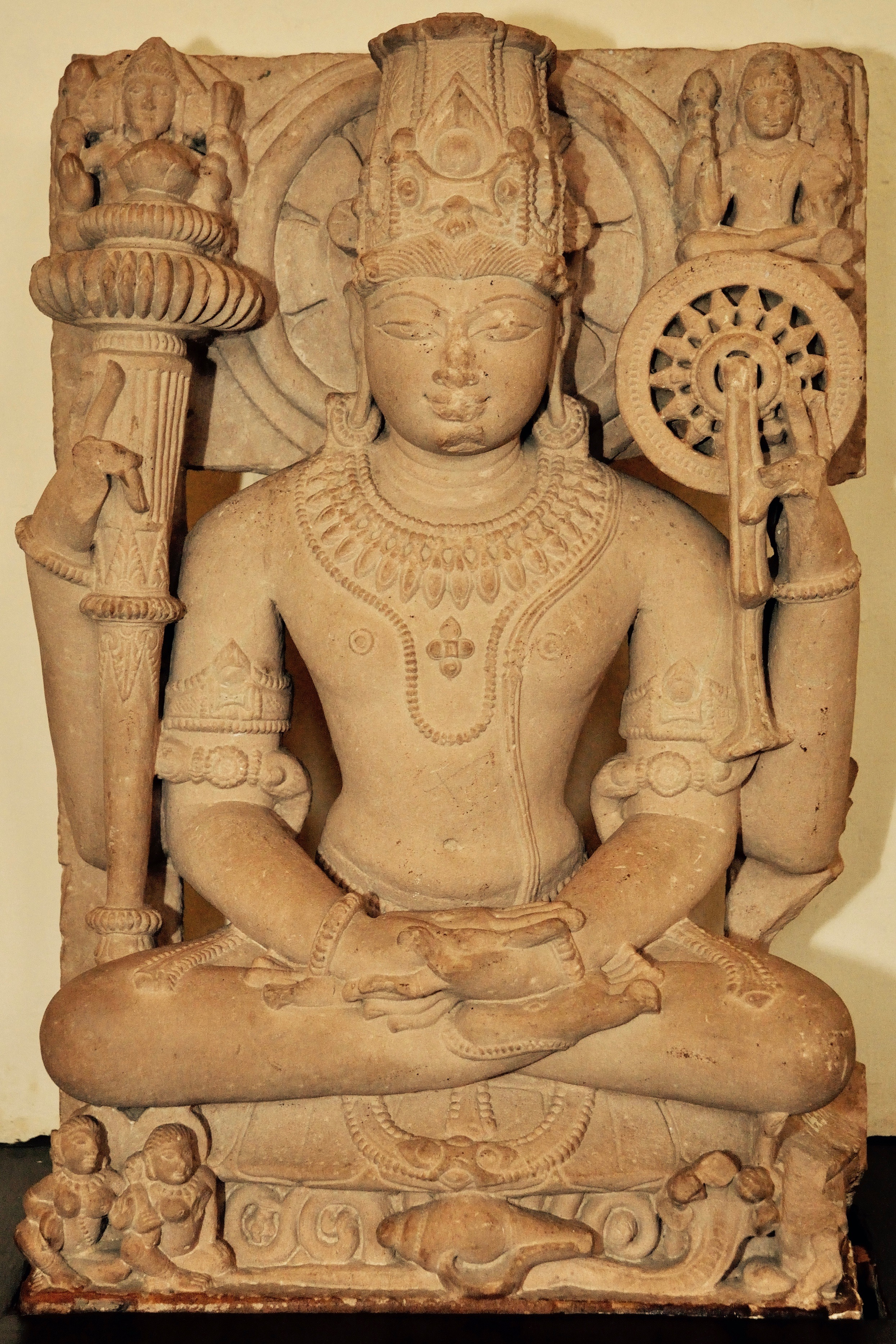
Four-armed Seated Vishnu in meditation, Medieval period

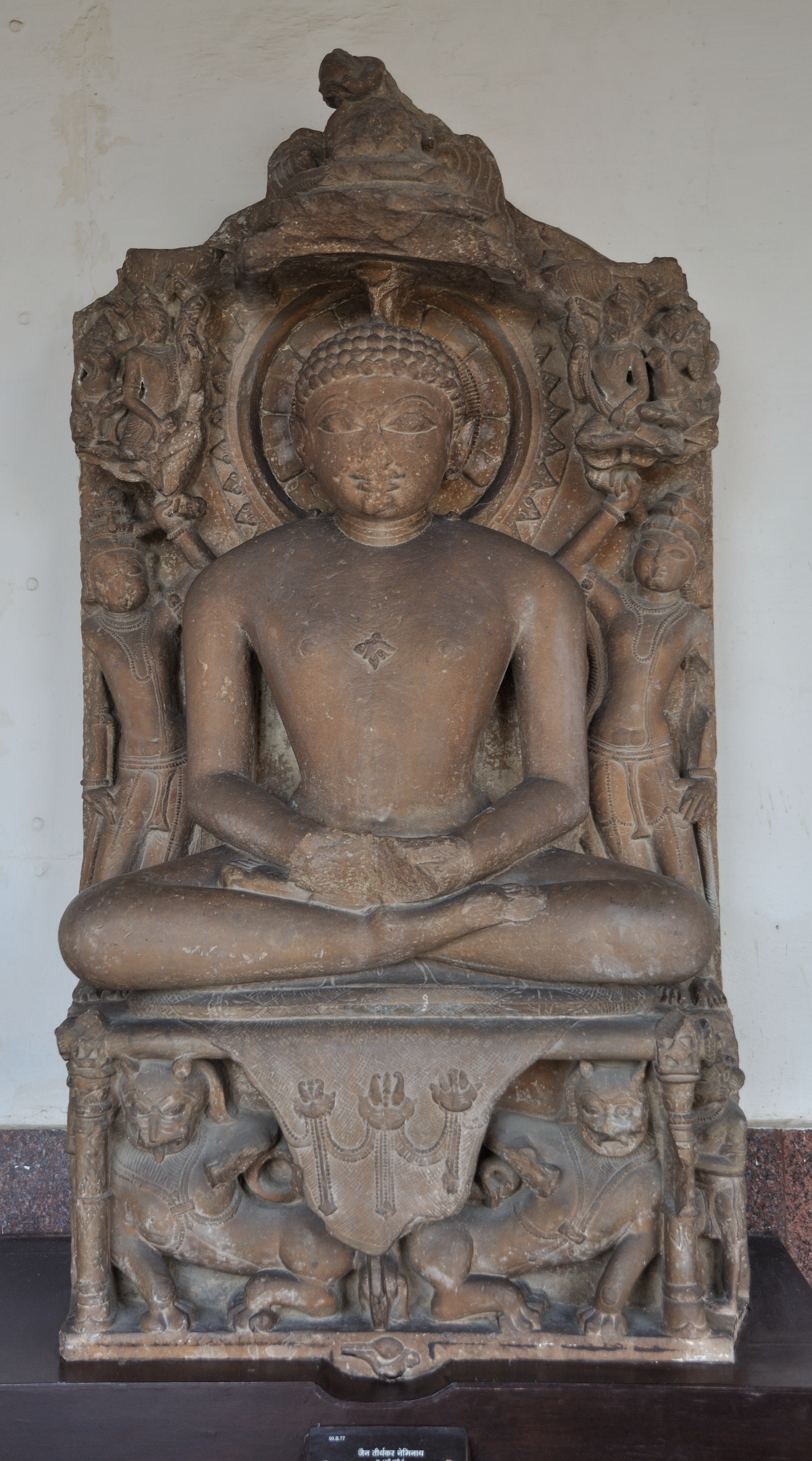
Jain Tirthankara Neminath, circa 12th century CE

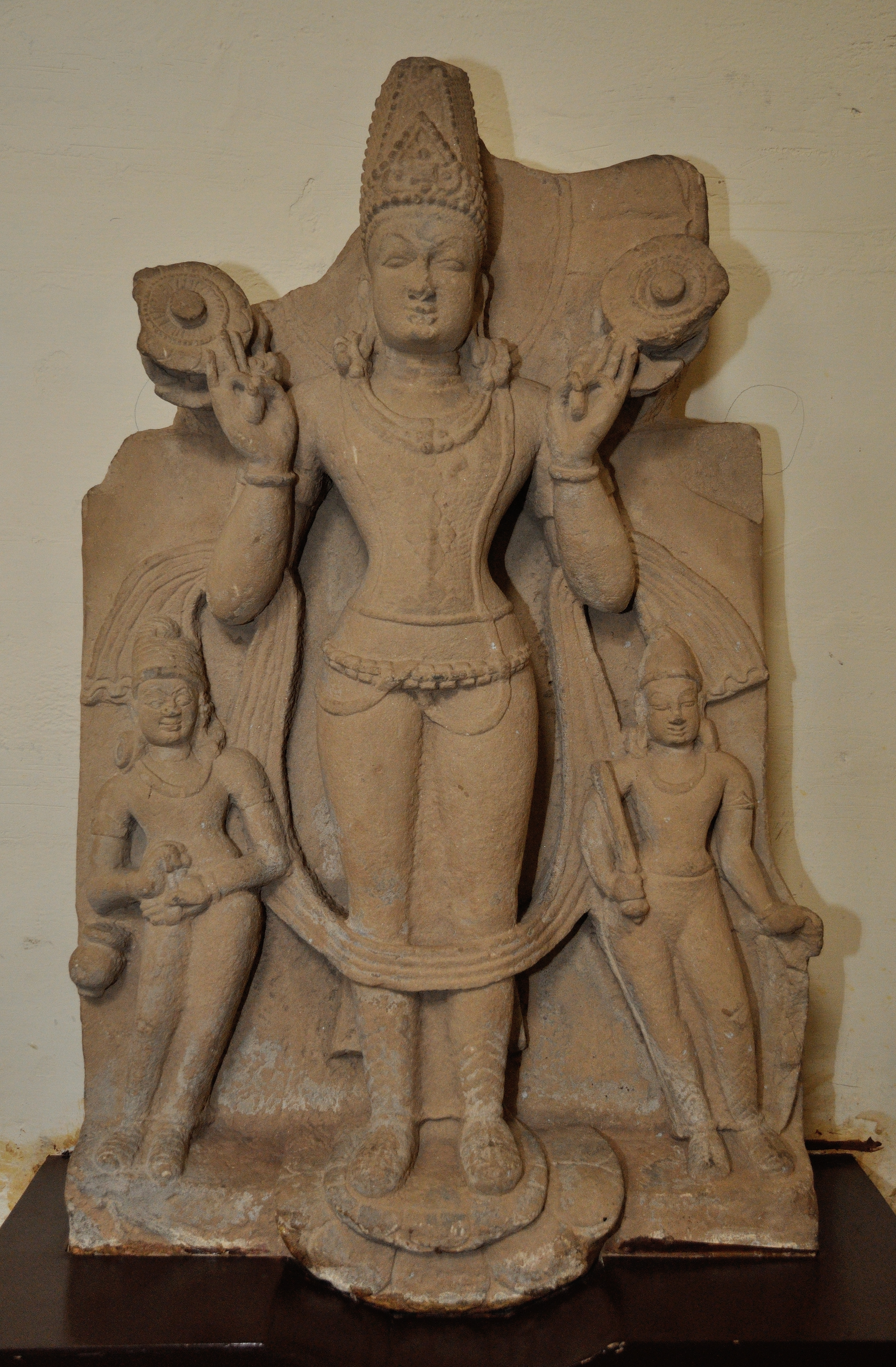
Standing Surya, Medieval period

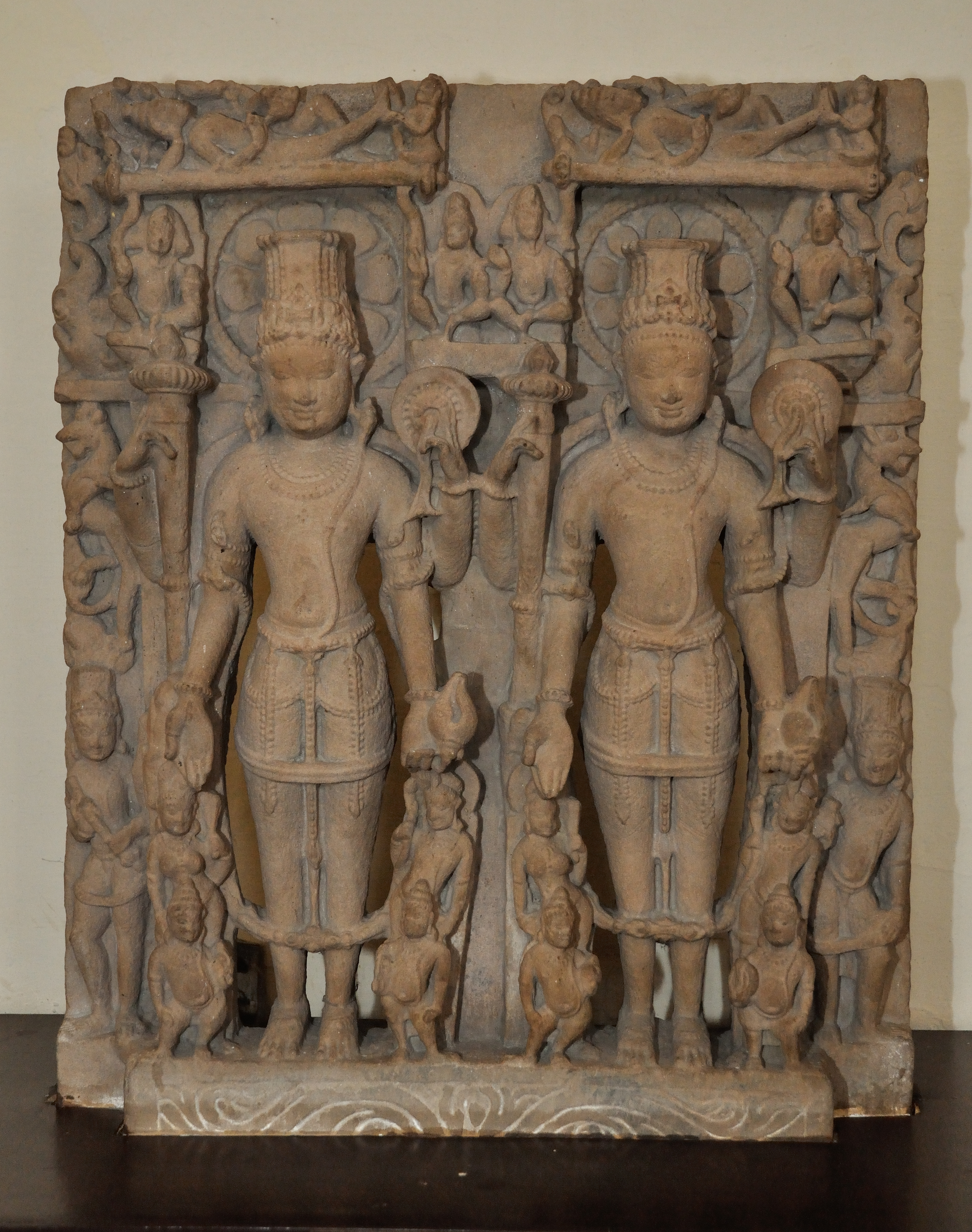
Standing Twin Vishnu, circa 10th century CE

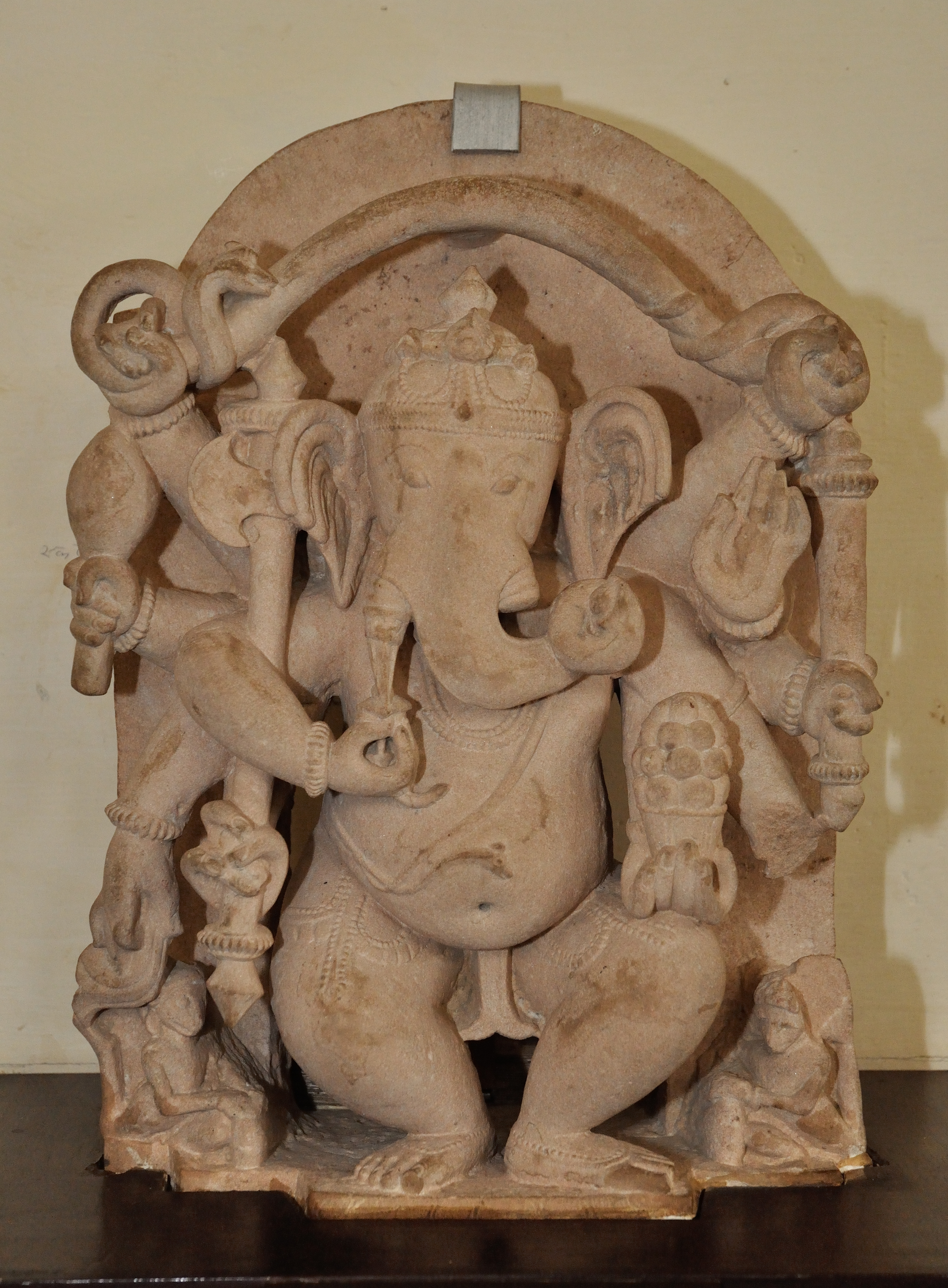
Ten-armed Ganesha, Medieval period

=== Early modern period (16th-19th century) ===
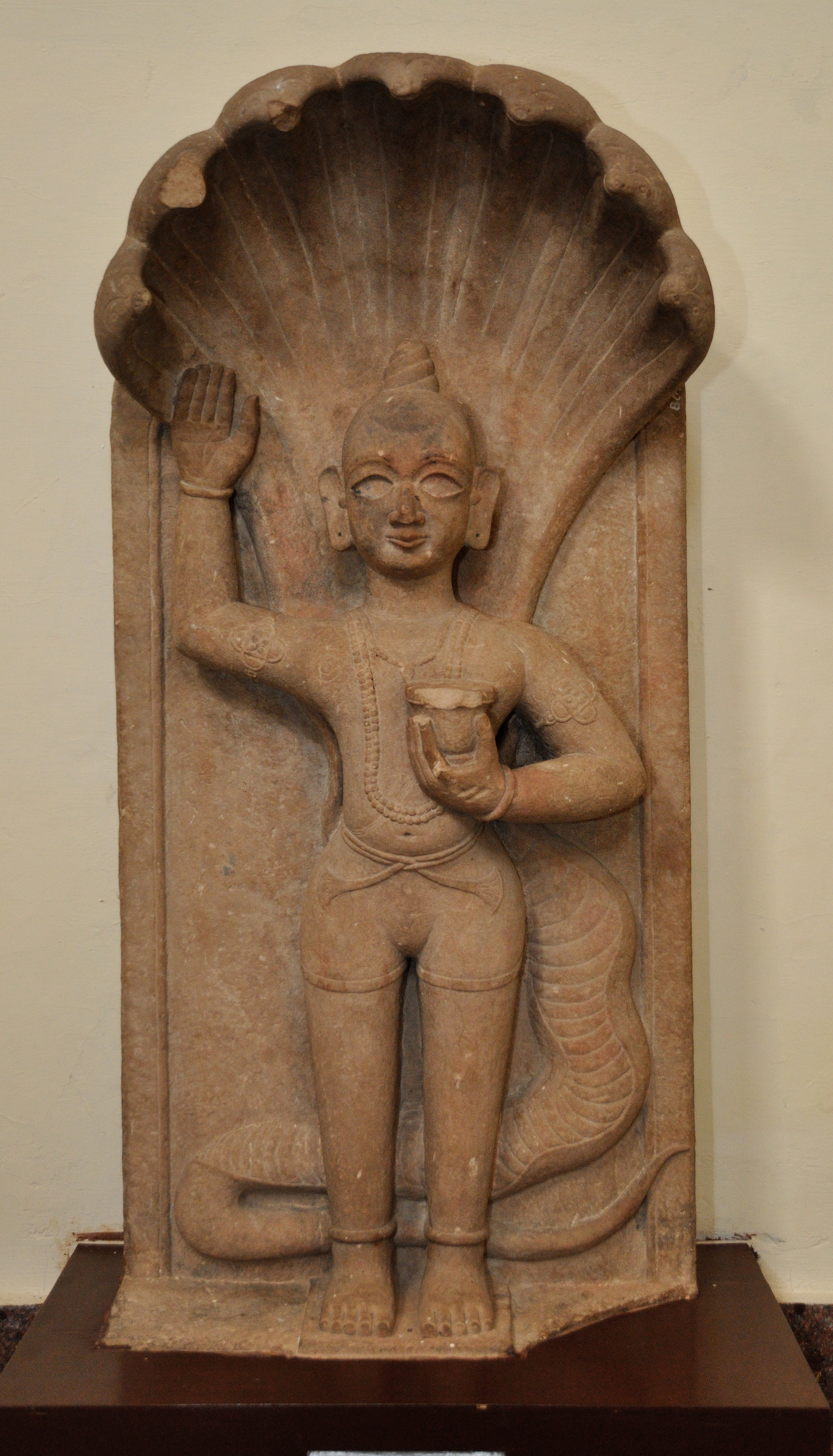
Balarama, circa 18th century CE

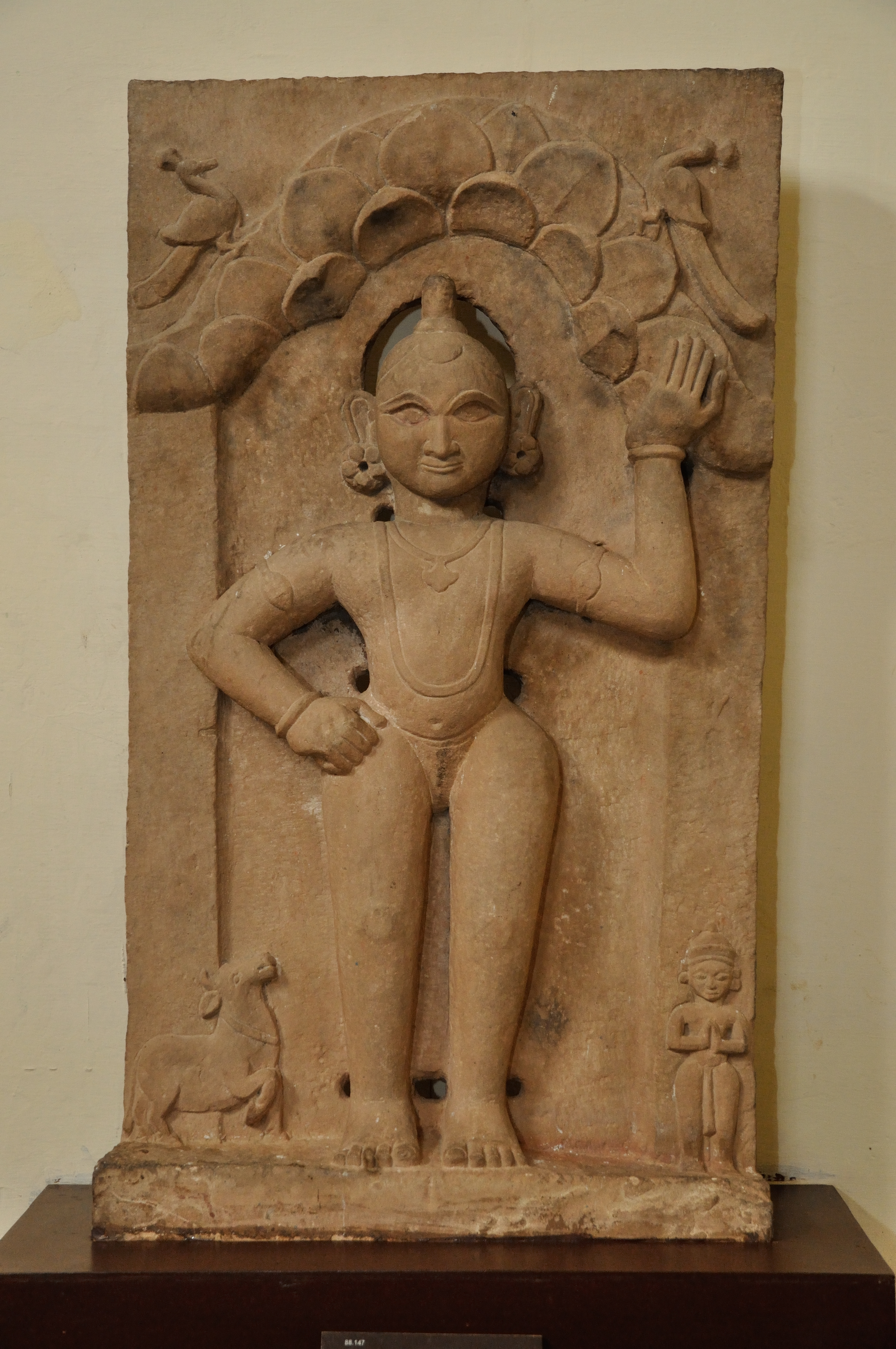
Krishna lifting Mount Govardhan, circa 19th century CE

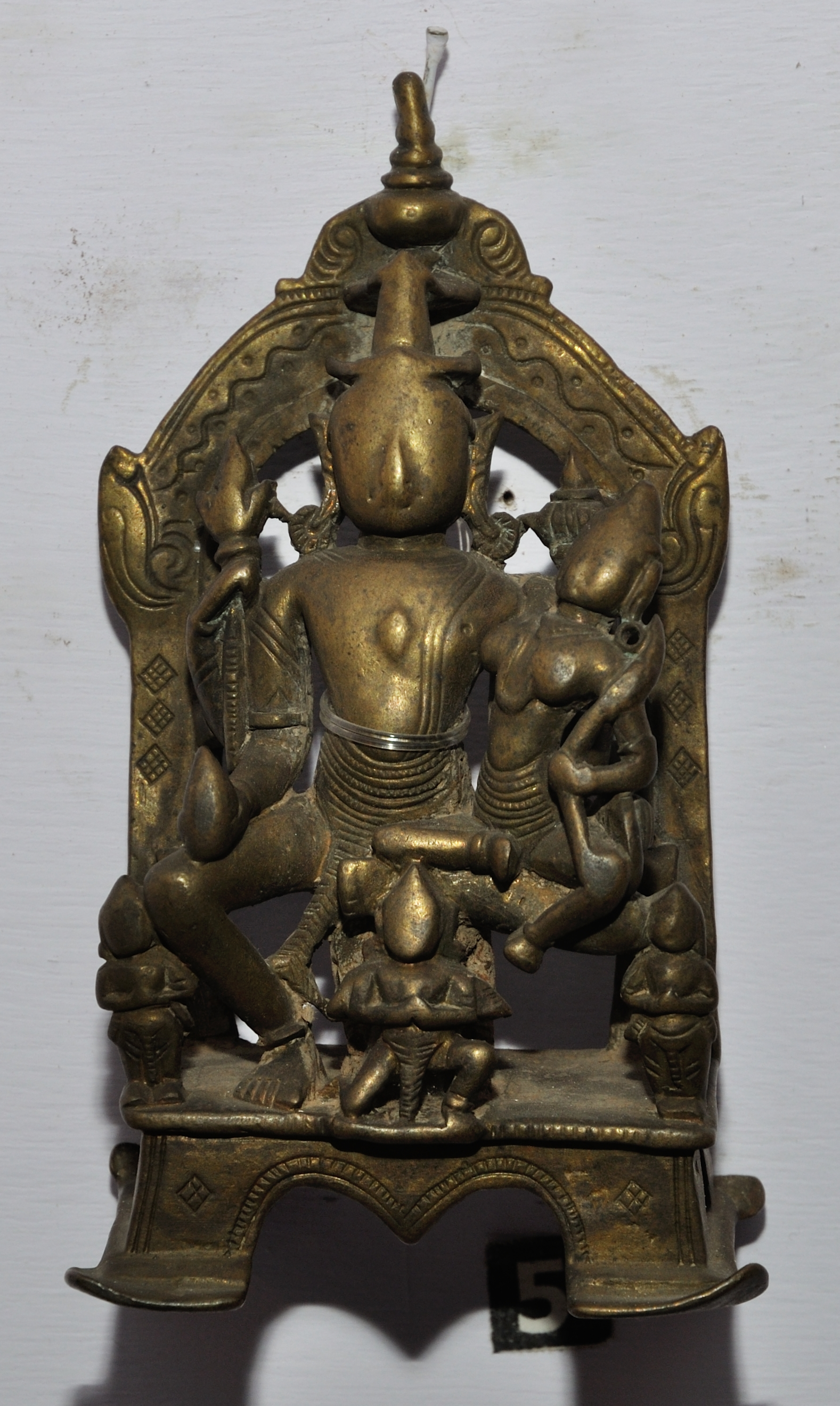
Lakshmi Narayan seated on Garuda – bronze – circa 18th Century CE

=== Modern period ===
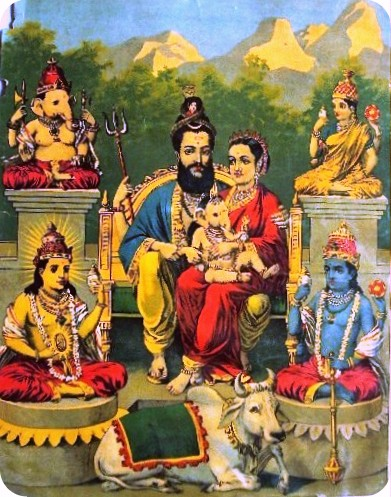
Oleograph by Raja Ravi Varma depicting a Shiva-centric Panchayatana

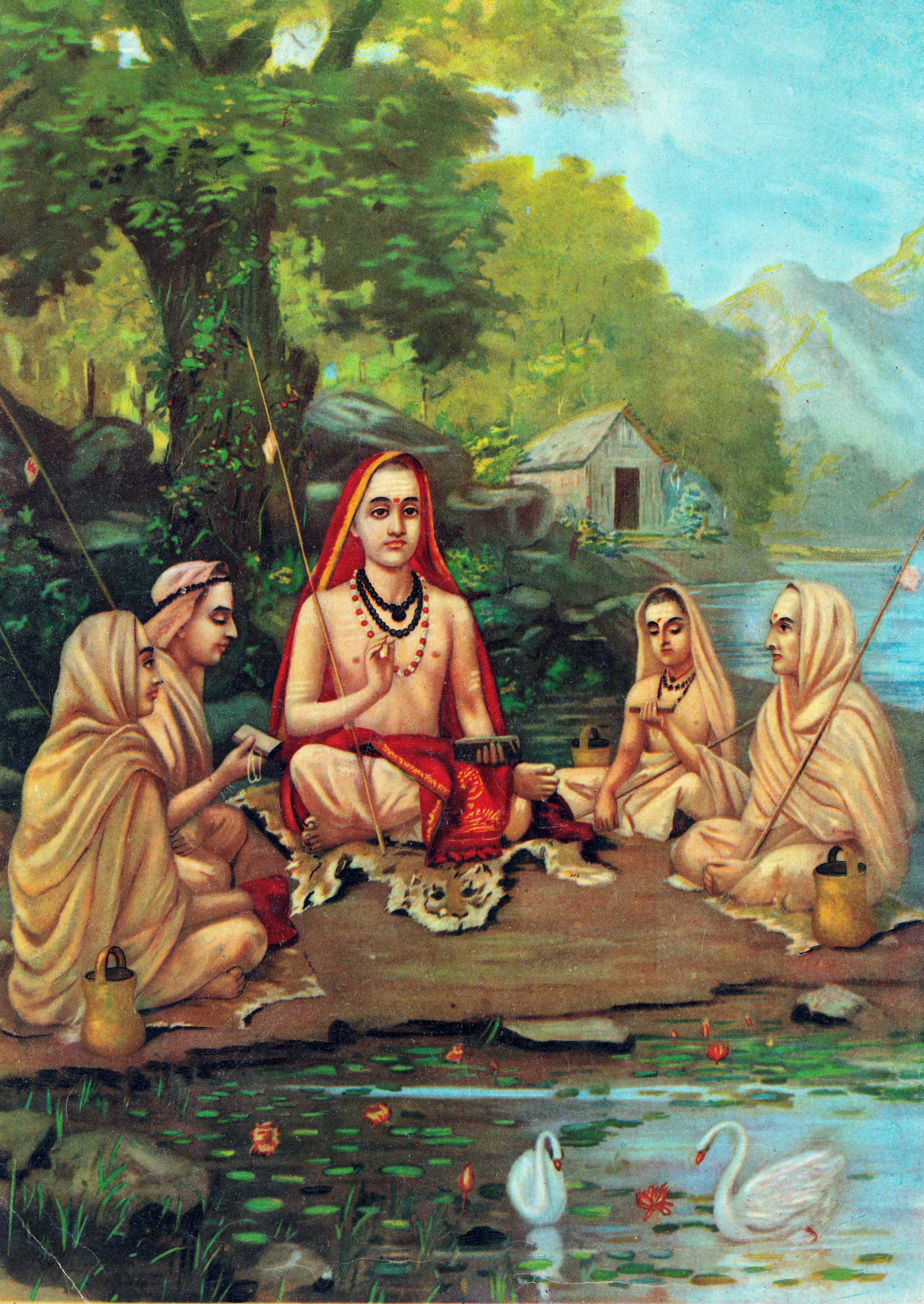
Oleograph by Raja Ravi Varma depicting Adi Shankara with disciples.

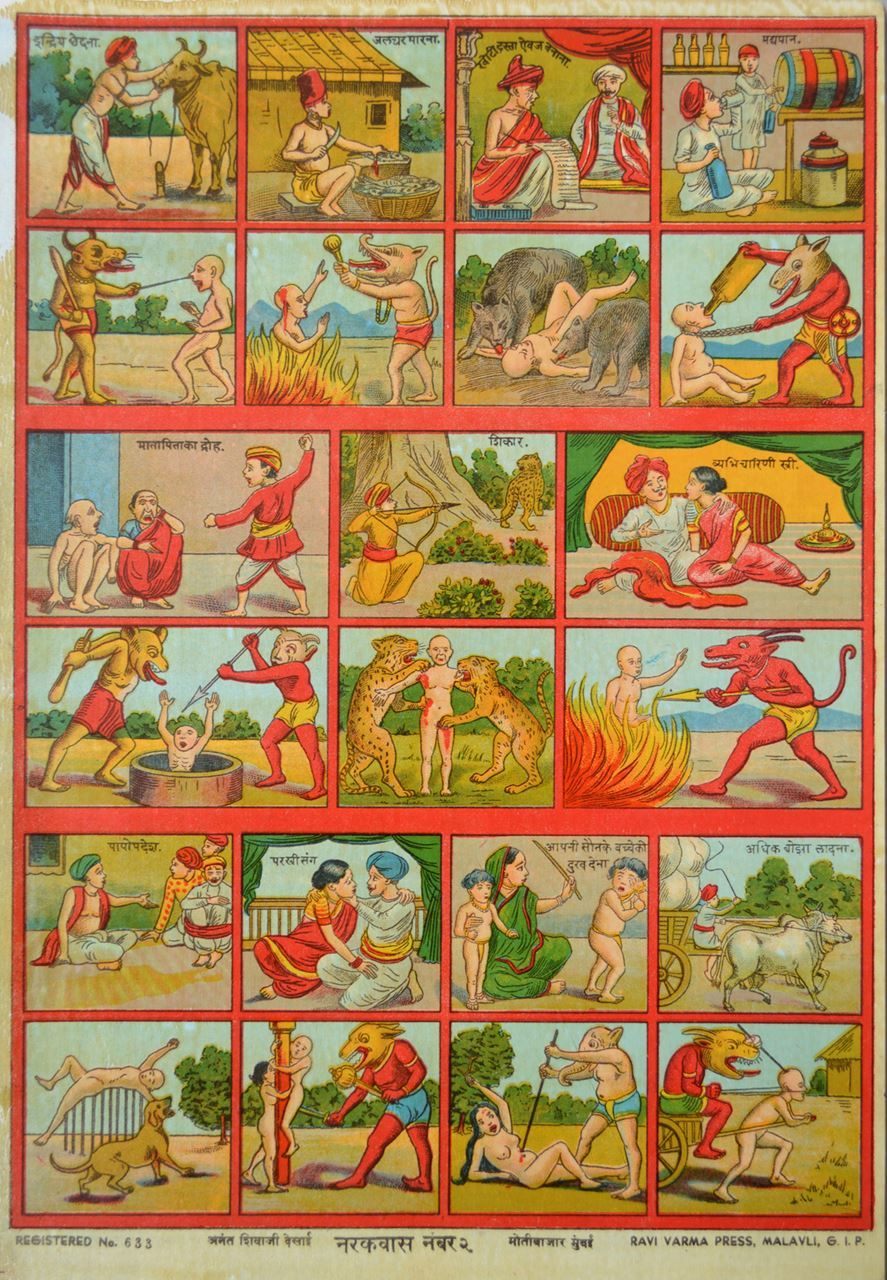
Karṇī-bharṇī lithograph by Ravi Varma Press depicting sins and punishments

"God posters", also known as framing pictures or calendar art, have emerged as a popular religious art genre and typically take the form of polychrome lithographs. God posters are typically sold at local retailer's shops who in turn acquire them from wholesalers and publishing firms. God posters feature either "supernaturals" i.e. deities, saints, or sacred sites. The god posters evoke various devotional responses: those who most value god posters have developed a popular new "omnipraxy" to worship the posters. In domestic settings, god posters are vested and embellished by devotees who pass them down in their families. God posters are often placed next to other sacred images in forms of religious associations. Some god posters also reflect syncretism in which various cults have been amalgamated in modern times. Hindu saints, ancient or modern, who are the recipients of personality cults often have "personality posters" dedicated to them. Posters of sacred sites are sometimes depicted as maps or diagrams, which act as yantras in which a pilgrim-devotee can act or reenact the pilgrimage or journey mentally without the requisite physical movement.

== Popular dance and music art forms ==
Natya Shastra and centuries of Hindu cultural traditions have given rise to several art forms. Some of which are:

- Bharatanatyam
- Kuchipudi
- Manipuri
- Mohiniyattam
- Odissi
- Sattriya
- Bhagavata Mela
- Yakshagana
- Carnatic Music

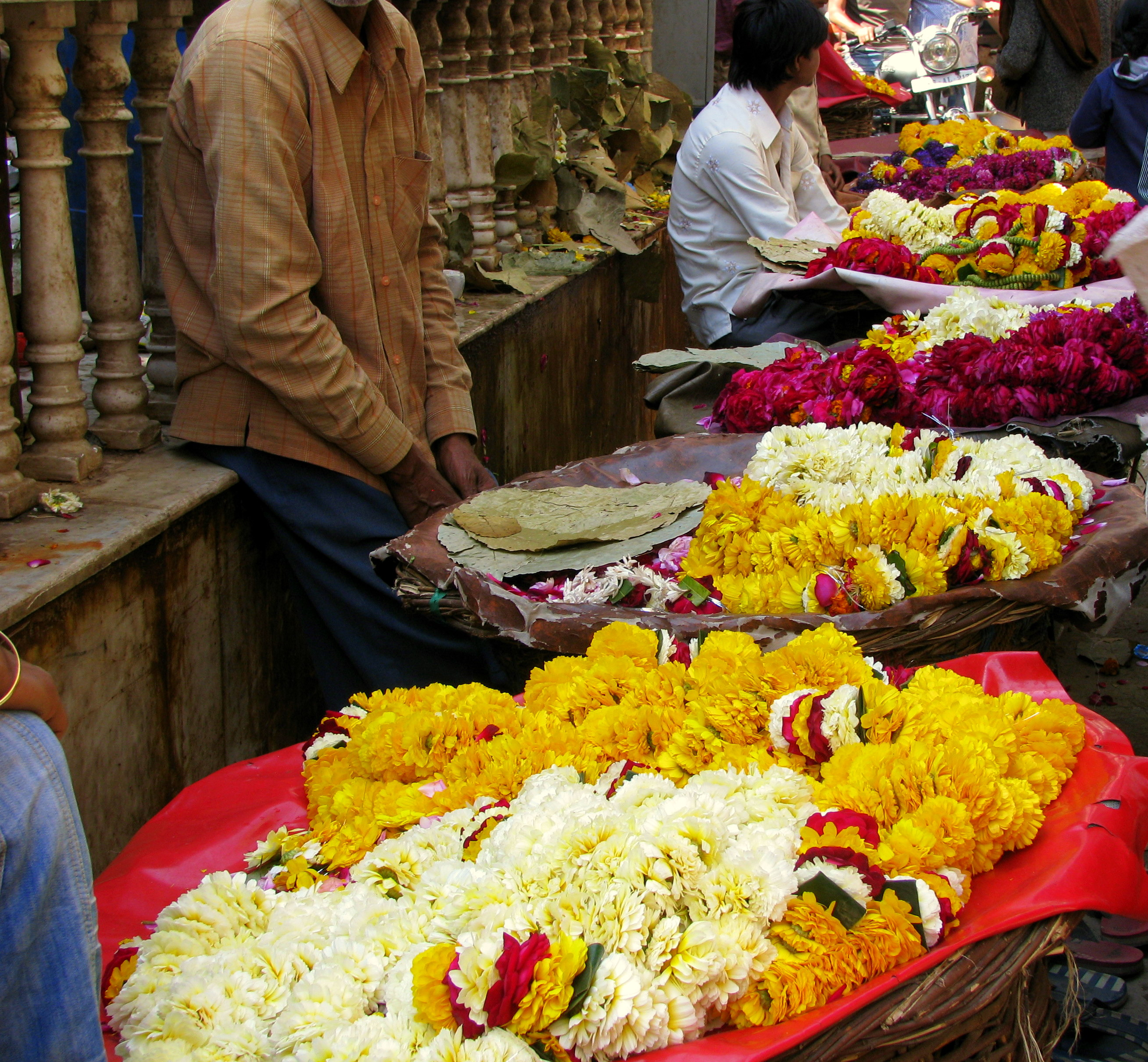
floral decoration

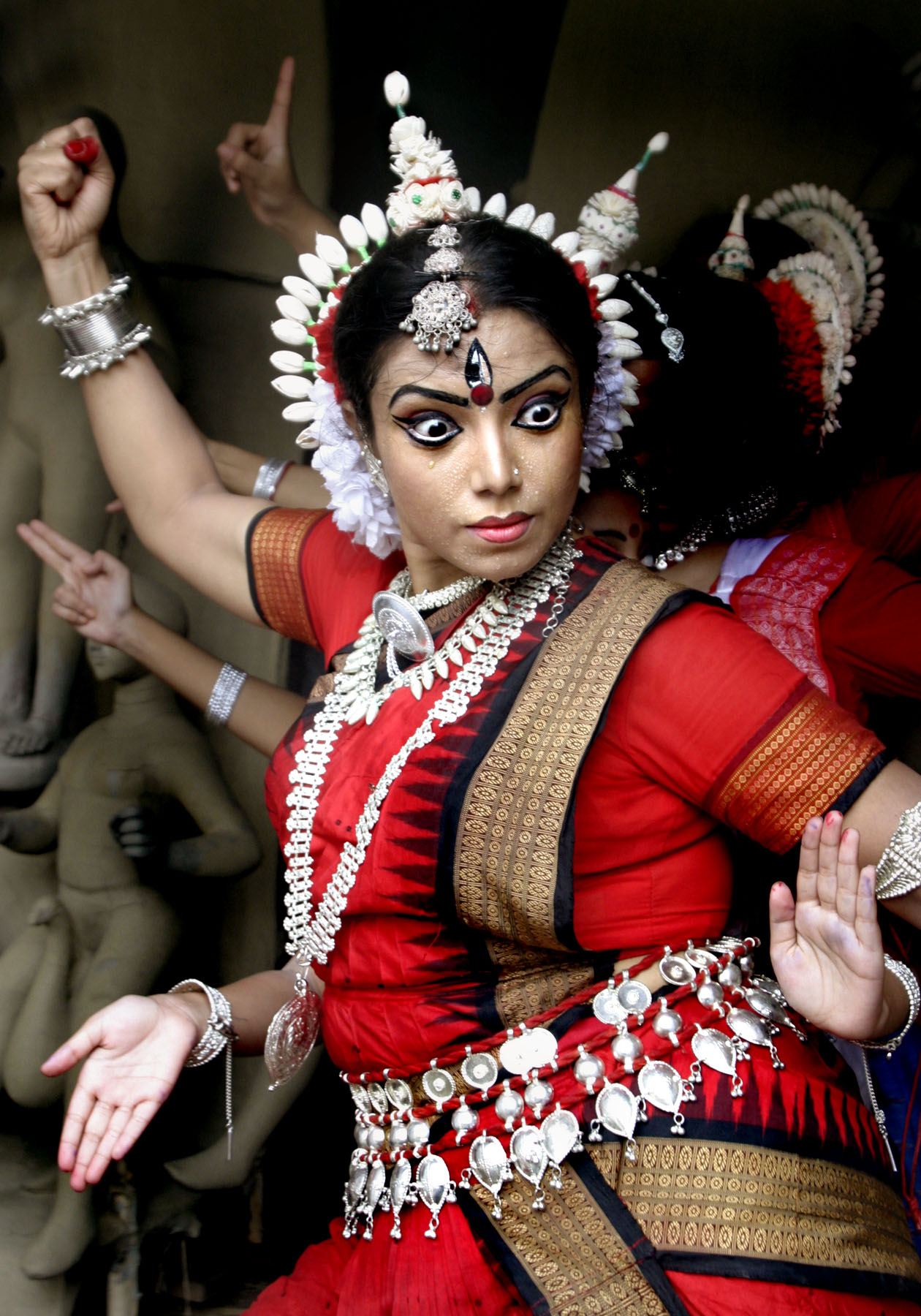
A Hindu dance depicting the goddess Durga

== 64 traditional arts ==
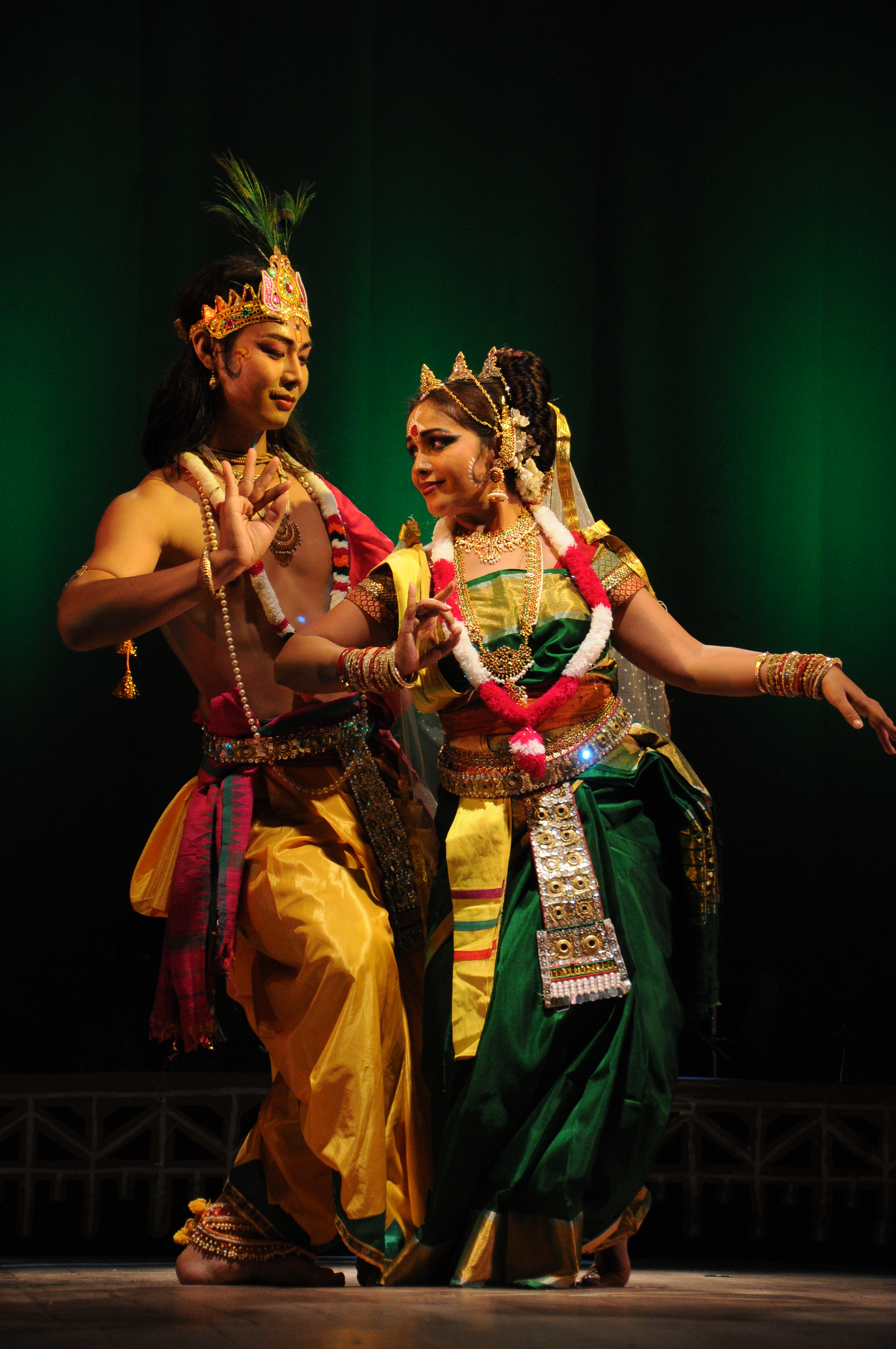
Hindu dances as part of ritual

- Singing
- Instrumental music
  - Learning music in Hindu culture was a difficult task before the 20th century because of a necessary birth into a gharana. After the early 1920s, integration of anyone wanting to learn classical Hindustani music could occur. An average ensemble normally includes a harmonium (which was brought to India by French missionaries), flute, veena, sitar, swaramandala, and a tabla. Many of the songs have strong themes that are related to theology such as a God's favorite pastimes, praise of any God whether they be in their original form in the Trimurti or the God's reincarnation, even stories of the creation of earth. Since instrumental music is a performance art it must follow strict guidelines that come from the treatise Natya Shastra.
- Dancing
- Painting
  - Indian variety – the different types of folk paintings are proud for Indian culture which reflects beauty, tradition and heritage of India. There are many types of traditional paintings like Madhubani, Rajsthani, Batik-Art, Patachitra, Gond, Mandala, Tribal Art Warli, Pithora, Bengali, Nirmal, Mysore, Tanjore paintings etc. which are the expressions of love, almighty, beauty, truth, tradition and art of each and every region of the India.
- Forehead adornments
- Rangoli: Making decorative floral and grain designs on the floor
- Home and temple flower arranging
- Personal grooming
- Mosaic tiling
- Bedroom arrangements
- Creating music with water
- Splashing and squirting with water
- Secret mantras
- Making flower garlands
- Head adornments
- Dressing
  - Drapery- The art of drapery has progressed over time. At one point both men and women wore dhotis but around the 14th century that changed and women's fashion became more intricate thus creating the sari. The drapery involved distinguishes the wearer's taste, occupation, and social status. The fabrics chosen range from cotton and synthetic fabrics all the way to silk. The fabric chosen depends on what occasion the wearer is going to use the item of clothing for. The draping of the sari comes in four different families: Marwari, Dravidian, Tribal, and Nivi. The family that the wearer chooses depends on the wearer's personal taste. The way an item of clothing is draped tells a lot about the wearer such as expression of creativity, progression of fashion, and where the user comes from.
- Costume decorations
- Perfumery
- Jewelry making
- Magic and illusions
- Ointments for charm and virility
- Manual dexterity
- Skills of cooking, eating and drinking
- Beverage and dessert preparation
- Sewing (making and mending garments)
- Embroidery
- Playing Vina and drum
- Riddles and rhymes
- Poetry games
- Tongue twisters and difficult recitation
- Literary recitation
- Drama and story telling
  - Drama in its early essence was performed mainly by male troupes and was often integrated with many of the other traditional art forms such as poetry, music, and story telling. Since drama is a performance art it also follows the Natya Shastra guidelines.
- Verse composition games
- Furniture caning
- Erotic devices and knowledge of sexual arts
- Crafting wooden furniture
- Architecture and house construction
- Distinguishing between ordinary and precious stones and metals
- Metal-working
- Gems and mining
- Gardening and horticulture
- Games of wager involving animals
- Training parrots and mynas to speak
- Hairdressing
- Coding messages
- Speaking in code
- Knowledge of foreign languages and dialects
- Making flower carriages
- Spells, charms and omens
- Making simple mechanical devices
- Memory training
- Game of reciting verses from hearing
- Decoding messages
- The meanings of words
- Dictionary studies
- Prosody and rhetoric
- Impersonation
- Artful dressing
- Games of dice
- The game of akarsha (a dice game played on a board)
- Making dolls and toys for children
- Personal etiquette and animal training
- Knowledge of dharmic warfare and victory
- Physical culture

=== Numerical list ===
1. gita — art of singing.
2. vadya — art of playing on musical instruments.
3. nritya — art of dancing.
4. natya — art of theatricals.
5. alekhya — art of painting.
6. viseshakacchedya — art of painting the face and body with colored unguents and cosmetics.
7. tandula-kusuma-bali-vikara — art of preparing offerings from rice and flowers.
8. pushpastarana — art of making a covering of flowers for a bed.
9. dasana-vasananga-raga — art of applying preparations for cleansing the teeth, clothes, and painting the body.
10. mani-bhumika-karma — art of making the jewel garlands.
11. sayya-racana — art of covering the bed.
12. udaka-vadya — art of playing on music in water.
13. udaka-ghata — art of splashing water on ground.
14. citra-yoga — art of practically applying an admixture of colors.
15. malya-grathana-vikalpa — art of designing a preparation of wreaths or garlands.
16. sekharapida-yojana — art of practically setting the coronet on the head.
17. nepathya-yoga — art of practically dressing
18. karnapatra-bhanga — art of decorating the tragus of the ear.
19. sugandha-yukti — art of practical application of aromatics.
20. bhushana-yojana — art of applying or setting ornaments.
21. aindra-jala — art of jugglery.
22. kaucumara — a kind of art.
23. hasta-laghava — art of sleight of hand.
24. citra-sakapupa-bhakshya-vikara-kriya — art of preparing varieties of foods – curries, soups, sweetmeats
25. panaka-rasa-ragasava-yojana — art of preparing palatable drinks and fruit juices
26. suci-vaya-karma — art of needleworks and weaving.
27. sutra-krida — art of playing with thread.
28. vina-damuraka-vadya — art of playing on lute and small x-shaped drum.
29. prahelika — art of making and solving riddles.
  1. pratimala — art of caping or reciting verse for verse as a trial for memory or skill.
30. durvacaka-yoga — art of practicing language difficult to be answered by others.
31. pustaka-vacana — art of reciting books.
32. natikakhyayika-darsana — art of enacting short plays and anecdotes.
33. kavya-samasya-purana — art of solving enigmatic verses.
34. pattika-vetra-bana-vikalpa — art of designing preparation of shield, cane and arrows.
35. tarku-karma — art of spinning by spindle.
36. takshana — art of carpentry.
37. vastu-vidya — art of engineering.
38. raupya-ratna-pariksha — art of testing silver and jewels.
39. dhatu-vada — art of metallurgy.
40. mani-raga jnana — art of judging jewels.
41. akara jnana — art of mineralogy.
42. vrikshayur-veda-yoga — art of practicing medicine or medical treatment, by herbs.
43. mesha-kukkuta-lavaka-yuddha-vidhi — art of knowing the mode of fighting of lambs, cocks and birds.
44. suka-sarika-prapalana (pralapana)? — art of maintaining or knowing conversation between male and female cockatoos.
45. utsadana — art of healing or cleaning a person with perfumes.
46. kesa-marjana-kausala — art of combing hair.
47. akshara-mushtika-kathana — art of talking with fingers.
48. mlecchita-kutarka-vikalpa — art of fabricating barbarous or foreign sophistry.
49. desa-bhasha-jnana — art of knowing provincial dialects.
50. pushpa-sakatika-nirmiti-jnana — art of knowing prediction by heavenly voice or knowing preparation of toy carts by flowers.
51. yantra-matrika — art of mechanics.
52. dharana-matrika — art of the use of amulets.
53. samvacya — art of conversation.
54. manasi kavya-kriya — art of composing verse mentally.
55. kriya-vikalpa — art of designing a literary work or a medical remedy.
56. chalitaka-yoga — art of practicing as a builder of shrines
57. abhidhana-kosha-cchando-jnana — art of the use of lexicography and meters.
58. vastra-gopana — art of concealment of cloths.
59. dyuta-visesha — art of knowing specific gambling.
60. akarsha-krida — art of playing with dice or magnet.
61. balaka-kridanaka — art of using children's toys.
62. vainayiki vidya — art of enforcing discipline.
63. vaijayiki vidya — art of gaining victory.
64. vaitaliki vidya — art of awakening master with music at dawn
65. aaaah vidya — art of awakening sound from Mani.

== Historic texts on art practices ==
- Natya Shastra
  - The Natya Shastra is the leading guide to the Hindu performing arts. It is based on the Natya Veda, which no longer exists, and is roughly 37 chapters long with 6,000 slokas.

== Cities dedicated to the production of art ==
- Raghurajpur
  - This city is solely dedicated to the production of artwork that is driven by the divine forces of Hinduism and these artworks are produced in a traditional fashion. The city is located in Eastern India (Orissa) and at one point this city was at risk of being completely destroyed due to British rule. During this time religion and the power of the kings were being overthrown and as such there was no reason for a city to exist whose main purpose is to supply traditional art. After this crisis occurred the city began to exclusively base itself on agriculture until a man named Jacnnath Mopatra led a training center for chitrakars. This revolution began production of the traditional art works once again in the 1950s and since the work being produced is known internationally.

== Common symbols ==
- Extra Limbs-Extra limbs are seen on many of the Hindu deities in paintings and sculptures. The extra limbs show how much power the god is capable of because of their ability to perform many tasks at once. Such as the goddess Sarasvati always has a minimum of four arms. Two of the arms will be playing a vina, representing the tuning of her knowledge, prayer beads in another hand and a scripture in another, both of these items are used to represent her devotion to her spirituality. Since she is the goddess of learning and art we see that she is very capable and very powerful in her area of expertise.
- Lotus Flower-The lotus flower is another common item seen constantly throughout the arts. The lotus flower represents purity, beauty, prosperity, fertility, and transcendence. The reason the flower shows these attributes is due to the process in which the lotus flower goes through in order to blossom. The flower grows out of mud and rests atop the water in which it grows showing the hardship it must endure in order to achieve maximum beauty. Many deities have their name based on the Sanskrit word for lotus such as Lakshimi.

== See also ==
- Kalā
- Alpana
- Balinese art
- Art of Champa
- Jnana Vigraham
- Madhubani art
- Rangoli
- Tanjore painting
