= Naneghat =

Mountain pass in the Western Ghats, India

Naneghat Cave and Inscriptions
- नाणेघाट (Marathi)
- Nanaghat caves
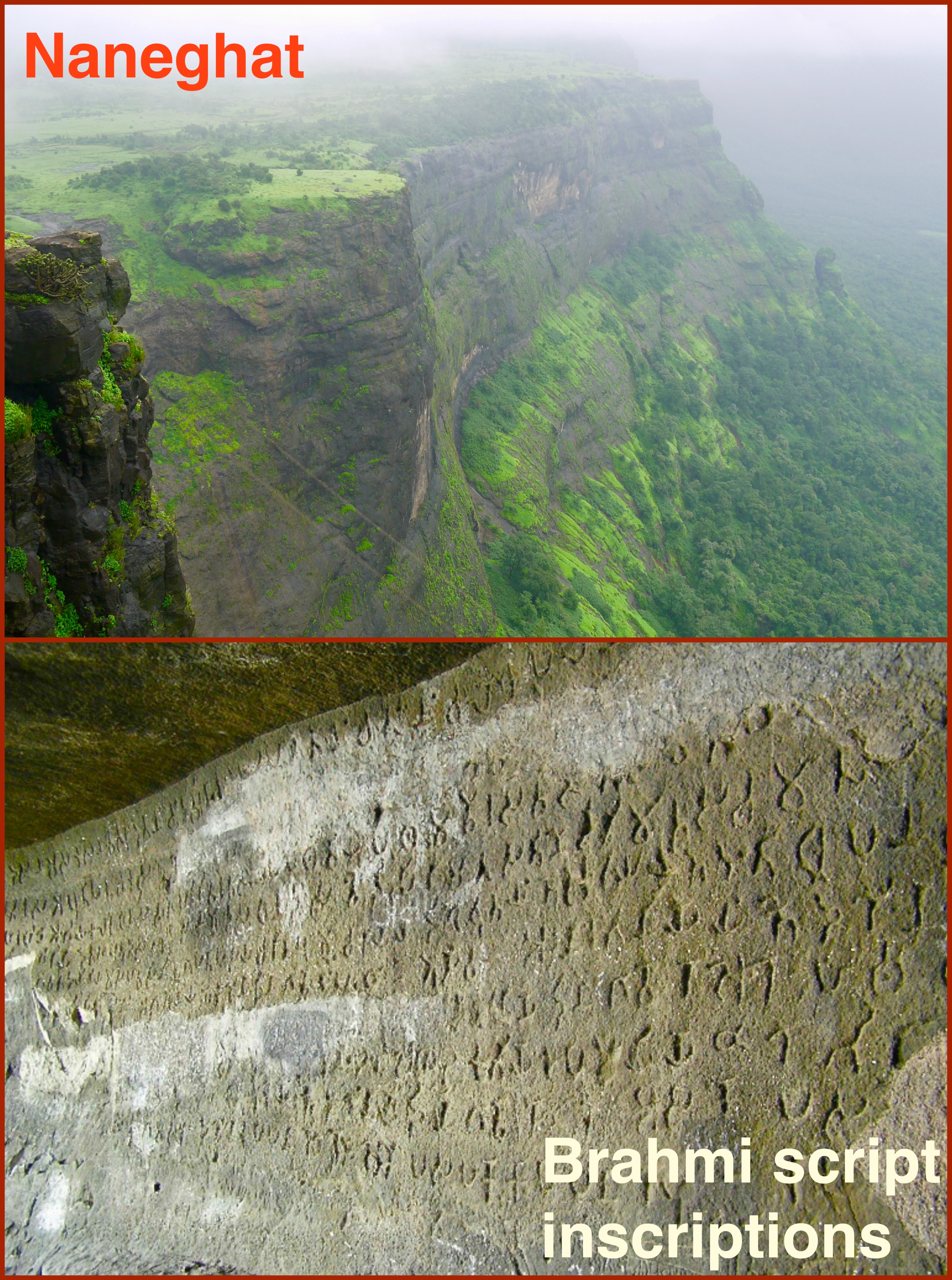
- Naneghat geography and inscriptions

- Location within India Location within Maharashtra
- 19°17′31.0″N 73°40′33.5″E
- Type: Caves, trade route passage
- Cultures: Hinduism
- Location: Maharashtra, India
- Region: Western Ghats

History
- Built: 2nd-century BCE
- Built by: Queens, Satavahana dynasty -Naganika

Site notes
- Material: Natural rock
- Elevation: 750 m (2,460 ft)
- Management: Archaeological Survey of India

Naneghat, also referred to as Nanaghat or Nana Ghat (IAST: Nānāghaṭ), is a mountain pass in the Western Ghats range between the Konkan coast and the ancient town of Junnar in the Deccan plateau. The pass is about 120 kilometres (75 mi) north of Pune and about 165 kilometres (103 mi) east from Mumbai, Maharashtra, India. It was a part of an ancient trading route, and is famous for a major cave with Sanskrit inscriptions in Brahmi script and Middle Indo-Aryan dialect. These inscriptions have been dated between the 2nd and the 1st century BCE, and attributed to the Satavahana dynasty era. The inscriptions are notable for linking the Vedic and Hinduism deities, mentioning some Vedic srauta rituals and of names that provide historical information about the ancient Satavahanas. The inscriptions present the world's oldest numeration symbols for "2, 4, 6, 7, and 9" that resemble modern era numerals, more closely those found in modern Nagari and Hindu-Arabic script.

== Location ==
Nanaghat pass stretches over the Western Ghats, through an ancient stone laid hiking trail to the Nanaghat plateau. The pass was the fastest key passage that linked the Indian west coast seaports of Sopara, Kalyan and Thana with economic centers and human settlements in Nasik, Paithan, Ter and others, according to Archaeological Survey of India. Near the top is large, ancient manmade cave. On the cave's back wall are a series of inscriptions, some long and others short. The high point and cave is reachable by road via Highways 60 or 61. The cave archaeological site is about 120 kilometres (75 mi) north of Pune and about 165 kilometres (103 mi) east from Mumbai. The Naneghat Cave is near other important ancient sites. It is, for example, about 35 kilometres (22 mi) from the Lenyadri Group of Theravada Buddhist Caves and some 200 mounds that have been excavated near Junnar, mostly from the 3rd-century BCE and 3rd-century CE period. The closest station to reach Naneghat is Kalyan station which lies on the Central Line.

== History ==
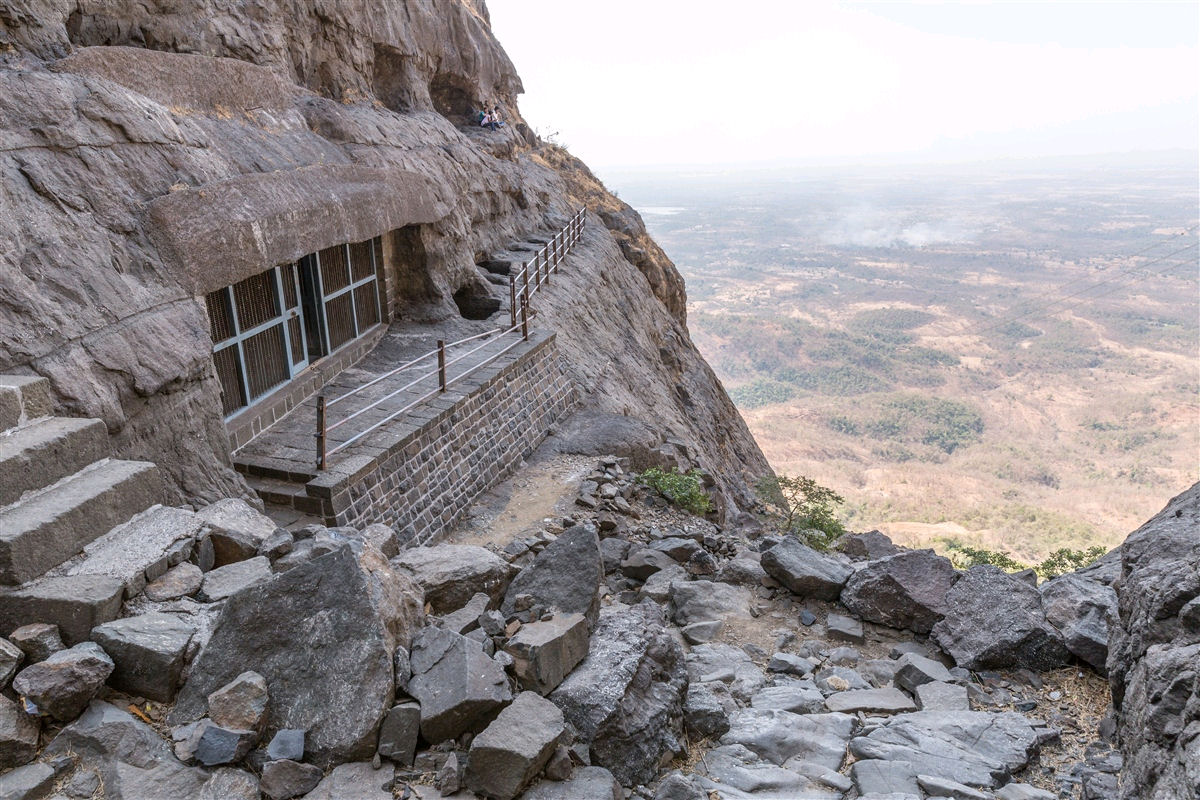
The Naneghat caves, likely an ancient rest stop for travellers.

During the reign of the Satavahana (c. 200 BCE – 190 CE), the Naneghat pass was one of the trade routes that connected the Konkan coast communities with Deccan high plateau through Junnar. Literally, the name nane means "coin" and ghat means "pass". The name is given because this path was used as a tollbooth to collect toll from traders crossing the hills. According to Charles Allen, there is a carved stone that from distance looks like a stupa, but is actually a two-piece carved stone container by the roadside to collect tolls.

The scholarship on the Naneghat Cave inscription began after William Sykes found them while hiking during the summer of 1828. Neither an archaeologist nor epigraphist, his training was as a statistician and he presumed that it was a Buddhist cave temple. He visited the site several times and made eye-copy (hand drawings) of the script panel he saw on the left and the right side of the wall. He then read a paper to the Bombay Literary Society in 1833 under the title, Inscriptions of the Boodh caves near Joonur, later co-published with John Malcolm in 1837. Sykes believed that the cave's "Boodh" (Buddhist) inscription showed signs of damage both from the weather elements as well as someone crudely incising to desecrate it. He also thought that the inscription was not created by a skilled artisan, but someone who was in a hurry or not careful. Sykes also noted that he saw stone seats carved along the walls all around the cave, likely because the cave was meant as a rest stop or shelter for those traveling across the Western Ghats through the Naneghat pass.

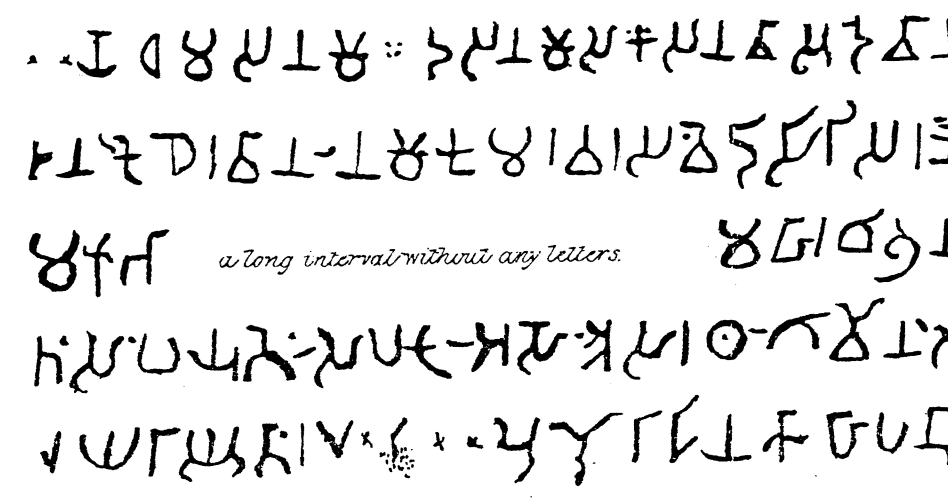
William Sykes made an imperfect eye-copy of the inscription in 1833, to bring it to scholarly attention.

Sykes proposed that the inscription were ancient Sanskrit because the statistical prevalence rate of some characters in it was close to the prevalence rate of same characters in then known ancient Sanskrit inscriptions. This suggestion reached the attention of James Prinsep, whose breakthrough in deciphering Brahmi script led ultimately to the inscription's translation. Much that Sykes guessed was right, the Naneghat inscription he had found was indeed one of the oldest Sanskrit inscriptions. He was incorrect in his presumption that it was a Buddhist inscription because its translation suggested it was a Hindu inscription. The Naneghat inscription were a prototype of the refined Devanagari to emerge later.

Georg Bühler published the first version of a complete interpolations and translation in 1883. He was preceded by Bhagvanlal Indraji, who in a paper on numismatics (coins) partially translated it and remarked that the Naneghat and coin inscriptions provide insights into ancient numerals.

=== Date ===
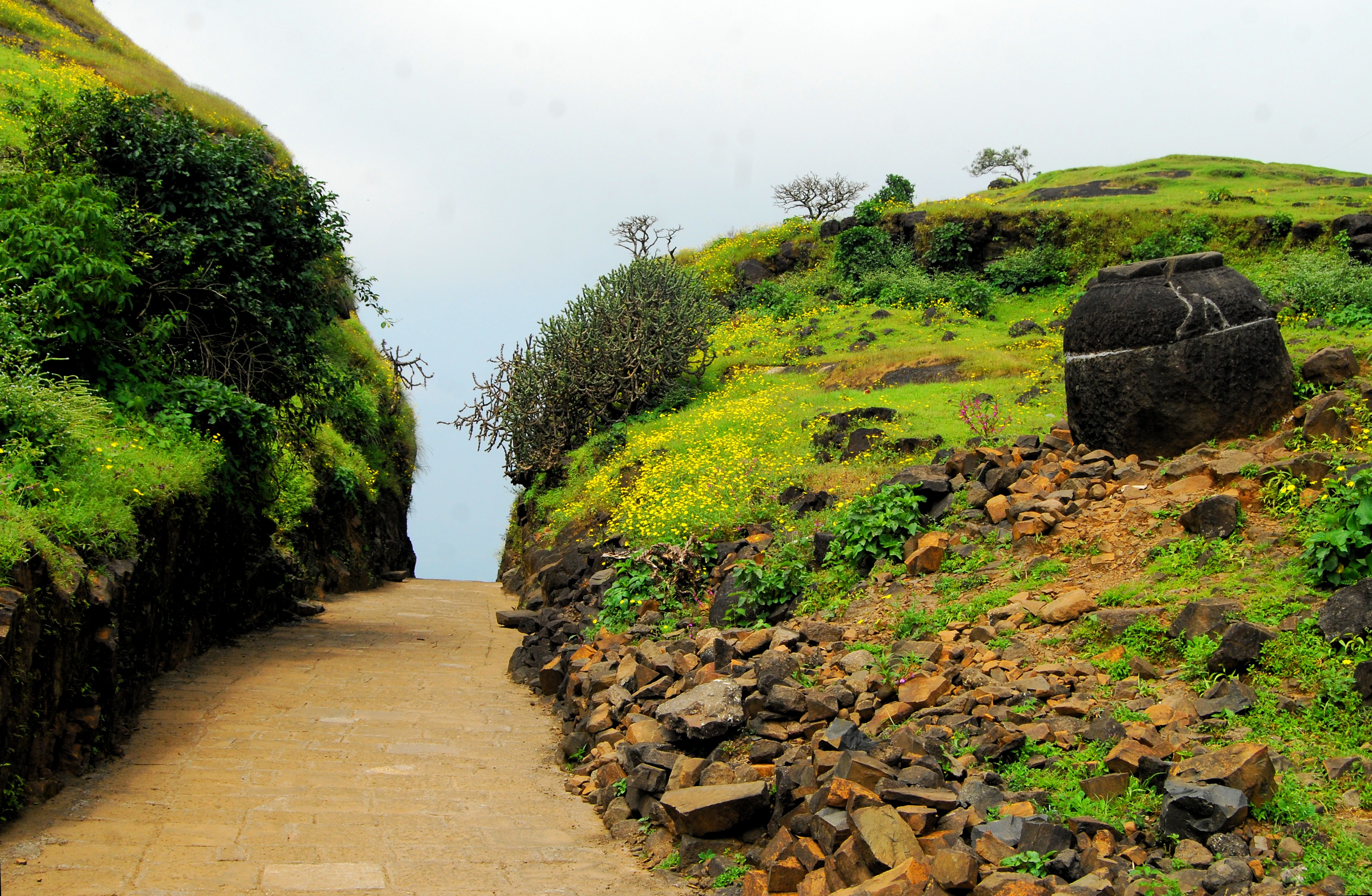
Naneghat Pass Entrance

The inscriptions are attributed to a queen of the Satavahana dynasty. Her name was either Nayanika or Naganika, likely the wife of king Satakarni. The details suggest that she was likely the queen mother, who sponsored this cave after the death of her husband, as the inscription narrates many details about their life together and her son being the new king.

The Naneghat cave inscriptions have been dated by scholars to the last centuries of the 1st millennium BCE. Most scholars date it to the early 1st-century BCE, some to 2nd-century BCE, a few to even earlier. Sircar dated it to the second half of the 1st-century BCE. Upinder Singh and Charles Higham date 1st century BCE.

The Naneghat records have proved very important in establishing the history of the region. Vedic Gods like Dharma Indra, Chandra and Surya are mentioned here. The mention of Samkarsana (Balarama) and Vasudeva (Krishna) indicate the prevalence of Bhagavata tradition of Hinduism in the Satavahana dynasty.

== Nanaghat inscriptions ==
Two long Nanaghat inscriptions are found on the left and right wall, while the back wall has small inscriptions on top above where the eight life-sized missing statues would have been before somebody hacked them off and removed them.

=== Left wall ===
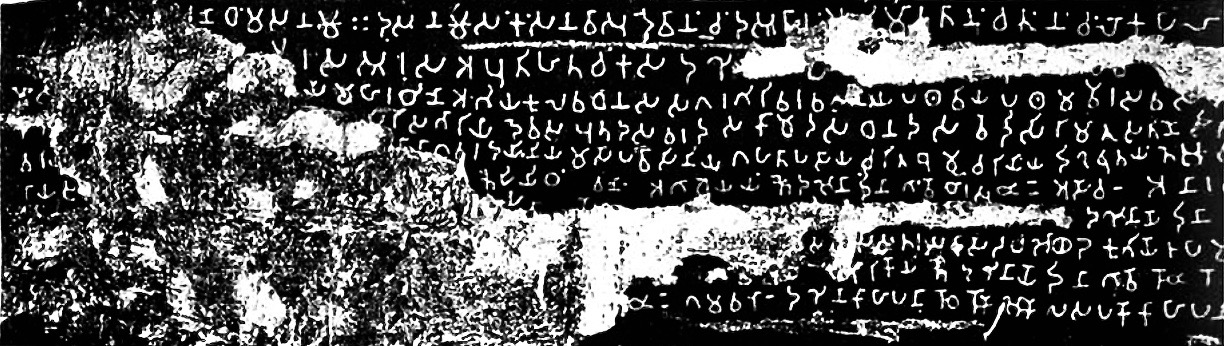
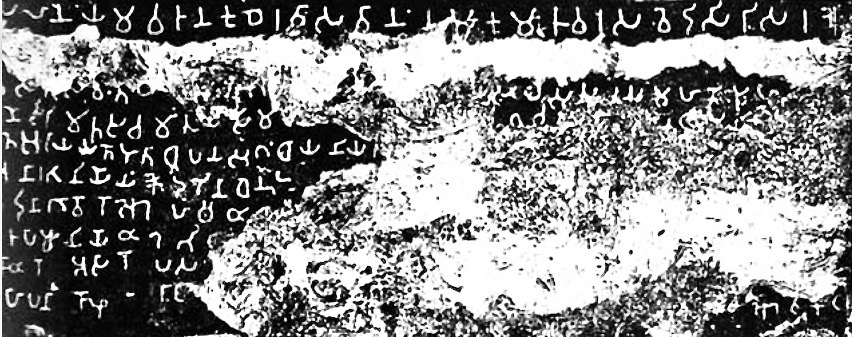
Left wall inscription, Brahmi script

==== Inscription ====
1. sidhaṃ ... no dhaṃmasa namo īdasa namo saṃkaṃsana-vāsudevānaṃ caṃda-sūtānaṃ mahimāvatānaṃ catuṃnaṃ caṃ lokapālānaṃ yama-varuna-kubera-vāsavānaṃ namo kumāravarasa vedisirisa raño
2. ......vīrasa sūrasa apratihatacakasa dakhināpaṭhapatino raño simukasātavāhanasa sunhāya ......
3. mā ..... bālāya mahāraṭhino aṃgiya-kulavadhanasa sagaragirivaravalayāya pathaviya pathamavīrasa vasa ... ya va alaha ......salasu ..ya mahato maha ...
4. .... sātakaṇi sirisa bhāriyā devasa putadasa varadasa kāmadasa dhanadasa vedisiri-mātu satino sirimatasa ca mātuya sīma .... pathamaya .....
5. variya ....... ānāgavaradayiniya māsopavāsiniya gahaṭāpasāya caritabrahmacariyāya dikhavratayaṃñasuṃḍāya yañāhutādhūpanasugaṃdhāya niya .......
6. rāyasa ........ yañehi yiṭhaṃ vano | agādheya-yaṃño dakhinā dinā gāvo bārasa 12 aso ca 1 anārabhaniyo yaṃño dakhinā dhenu .........
7. ...... dakhināya dinā gāvo 1700 hathī 10 .....
8. ......... as ..... sasataraya vāsalaṭhi 289 kubhiyo rupāmayiyo 17 bhi ......
9. .......... riko yaṃño dakhināyo dinā gāvo 11,000 asā 1,000 pasapako ..............
10. ............. 12 gamavaro 1 dakhinā kāhāpanā 24,400 pasapako kāhāpanā 6,000 | rājasūya-yaṃño ..... sakaṭaṃ

The missing characters do not match the number of dots; Bühler published a more complete version.

==== Left wall translation without interpolation ====
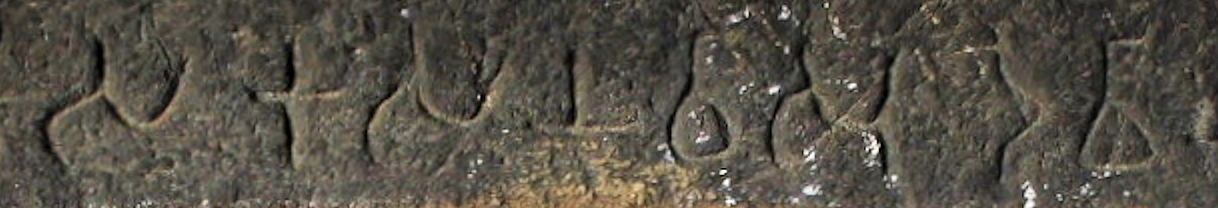
Samkasana (𑀲𑀁𑀓𑀲𑀦) and Vāsudeva (𑀯𑀸𑀲𑀼𑀤𑁂𑀯𑀸) in the Naneghat cave inscription

1. Sidham (Note: Variously translated to "Success" or "Om adoration"".) to Dharma, adoration to Indra, adoration to Samkarshana and Vāsudeva, (Note: Samkarshana and Vasudeva are synonyms for Balarama and Krishna.) the descendants of the Moon ("Chandra") endowed with majesty, and to the four guardians of the world ("Lokapalas"), Yama, Varuna, Kubera and Vāsava; praise to Vedisri, the best of royal princes (kumara)! (Note: Kumaravarasa translated to "royal princes" or "Kartikeya".) Of the king.
2. .... of the brave hero, whose rule is unopposed, the lord of Dakshinapath, King Simuka the Satavahana......
3. By ..... the daughter of the Maharathi, the increaser of the Amgiya race, the first hero of the earth that is girdled by the ocean and the best of mountains....
4. wife of . . . Sri, the lord who gives sons, boons, desires and wealth, mother of Yedisri and the mother of the illustrious Sakti.....
5. Who gave a . . . most excellent nagavaradayiniya, (Note: Buhler states that its translation is uncertain, can be either "who gave a most excellent image of a snake deity" or "who gave a most excellent image of an elephant deity" or "who gave a boon of a snake or elephant deity".) who fasted during a whole month, who in her house an ascetic, who remained chaste, who is well acquainted with initiatory ceremonies, vows and offerings, sacrifices, odoriferous with incense, were offered......
6. O the king ........ sacrifices were offered. Description - An Agnyadheya sacrifice, a dakshina (Note: variously translated as "sacrificial fee" or "donation".) was offered twelve, 12, cows and 1 horse; - an Anvarambhaniya sacrifice, the dakshina, milch-cows.....
7. ...... dakshina were given consisting of 1700 cows, 10 elephants,
8. .... 289.....17 silver waterpots.....
9. ..... a rika-sacrifice, dakshina were given 11,000 cows, 1000 horses
10. ......12 . . 1 excellent village, a dakshina 24,400 Karshapanas, the spectators and menials 6,001 Karshapanas; a Raja ........ the cart

==== Left wall translation with interpolation ====
Naneghat deities
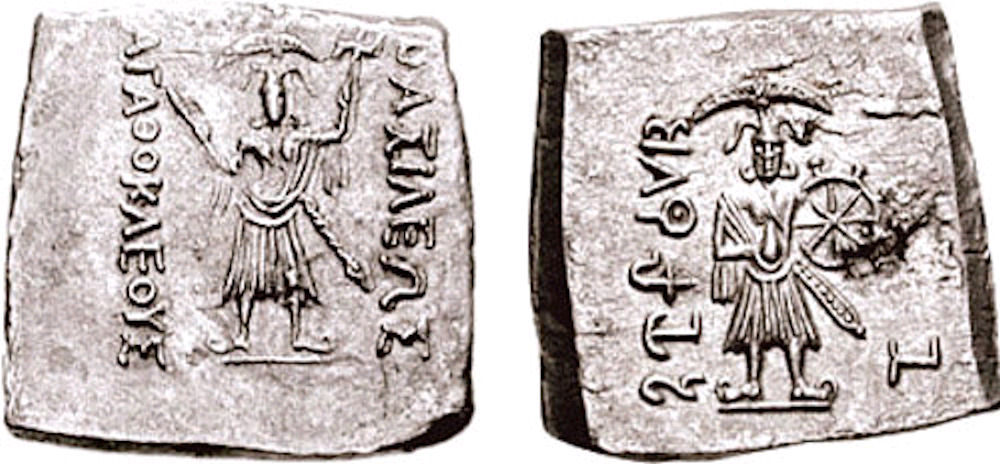
The two deities Samkarshana and Vāsudeva on the coinage of Agathocles of Bactria, circa 190-180 BCE.
1. [Om adoration] to Dharma [the Lord of created beings], adoration to Indra, adoration to Samkarshana and Vāsudeva, the descendants of the Moon (who are) endowed with majesty, and to the four guardians of the world, Yama, Varuna, Kubera and Vasava; praise to Vedisri, the best of royal princes! Of the king.
2. .... of the brave hero, whose rule is unopposed, of the lord of the Deccan, King Simuka the first of the Satavahanas......
3. By ..... the daughter of the Maharathi, the increaser of the Amgiya race, the first hero of the earth that is girdled by the ocean and the best of mountains....
4. (who is the) wife of . . . Sri, the lord who gives sons, boons, (the fulfillment of) desires and wealth, (who is the) mother of Yedisri and the mother of the illustrious Sakti.....
5. Who gave a . . . most excellent (image of) a snake (deity), who fasted during a whole month, who (even) in her house (lived like) an ascetic, who remained chaste, who is well acquainted with initiatory ceremonies, vows and offerings, sacrifices, odoriferous with incense, were offered......
6. O the king ........ sacrifices were offered. Description - An Agnyadheya sacrifice (was offered), a dakshina was offered (consisting of) twelve, 12, cows and 1 horse; - an Anvarambhaniya sacrifice (was offered), the dakshina (consisted of), milch-cows.....
7. ...... dakshina were given consisting of 1700 cows, 10 elephants,
8. .... (289?).....17 silver waterpots.....
9. ..... a rika-sacrifice, dakshina were given (consisting of) 11,000 cows, 1000 horses
10. ......12 . . 1 excellent village, a dakshina (consisted of) 24,400 Karshapanas, (the gifts to) the spectators and menials (consisted of) 6,001 Karshapanas; a Raja [suya-sacrifice]........ the cart

=== Right wall ===
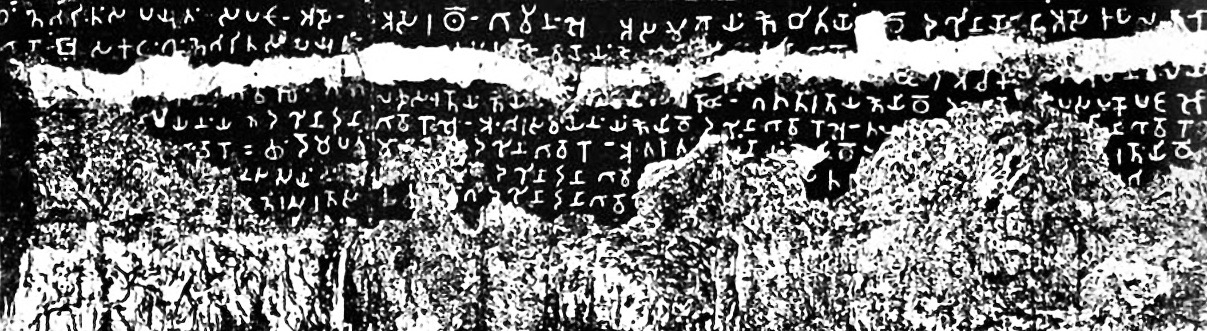
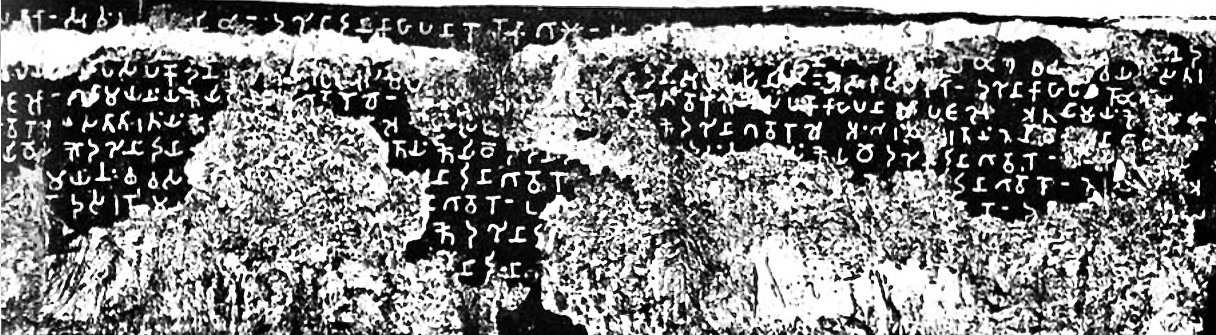
Right wall inscription, Brahmi script

==== Inscription ====
1. ..dhaṃñagiritaṃsapayutaṃ sapaṭo 1 aso 1 asaratho 1 gāvīnaṃ 100 asamedho bitiyo yiṭho dakhināyo dinā aso rupālaṃkāro 1 suvaṃna ..... ni 12 dakhinā dinā kāhāpanā 14,000 gāmo 1 haṭhi ........ dakhinā dinā
2. gāvo ... sakaṭaṃ dhaṃñagiritaṃsapayutaṃ ...... ovāyo yaṃño ..... 17 dhenu .... vāya +satara sa
3. ........... 17 aca .... na ..la ya ..... pasapako dino ..... dakhinā dinā su ... pīni 12 tesa rupālaṃkāro 1 dakhinā kāhāpanā 10,000 ... 2
4. ......gāvo 20,000 bhagala-dasarato yaṃño yiṭho dakhinā dinā gāvo 10,000 | gargatirato yaño yiṭho dakhinā ..... pasapako paṭā 301 gavāmayanaṃ yaṃño yiṭhodakhinā dinā gāvo 1100 | .............. gāvo 1100 pasapako kāhāpanā +paṭā 100 atuyāmo yaṃño .....
5. ........ gavāmayanaṃ yaño dakhinā dinā gāvo 1100 | aṃgirasāmayanaṃ yaṃño yiṭho dakhinā gāvo 1,100 | ta ............. dakhinā dinā gāvo 1100 | satātirataṃ yaṃño ........ 100 ......... yaño dakhinā gāvo 110 aṃgirasatirato yaṃño yiṭho dakhinā gāvo
6. ......... gāvo 1,002 chaṃdomapavamānatirato dakhinā gāvo 100 | aṃgirasatirato yaṃño yiṭho dakhinā ....... rato yiṭho yaño dakhinā dinā ....... to yaṃño yiṭho dakhinā ......... yaṃño yiṭho dakhinā dinā gāvo 1000 | ............
7. ......... na +sayaṃ .......... dakhinā dinā gāvo .......... ta ........ aṃgirasāmayanaṃ chavasa ........ dakhinā dinā gāvo 1,000 ........... dakhinā dinā gāvo 1,001 terasa ... a
8. ........ terasarato sa ......... āge dakhinā dinā gāvo ......... dasarato ma .......... dinā gāvo 1,001 u ........... 1,001 da ...........
9. ........ yaño dakhinā dinā .........
10. .......... dakhinā dinā ..........

The missing characters do not match the number of dots; Bühler published a more complete version.

==== Right wall translation without interpolation ====
1. ...used for conveying a mountain of grain, 1 excellent dress, 1 horse, 1 horse-chariot, 100 kine. A second horse-sacrifice was offered; dakshina were given 1 horse with silver trappings, 12 golden...... an(other) dakshina was given 14,000 (?) Karshapanas, 1 village . . elephant, a dakshina was given
2. ....cows, the cart used for conveying a mountain of grain..... an..... Ovaya sacrifice.......... 17 milch cows (?)....
3. ........ 17 ....... presents to the spectators were given.... a dakshina was given 12..... 1 silver ornaments for them, a dakshina was given consisting of 10,000 Karshapanas............
4. ..... 20,000(?) cows; a Bhagala-Dasharatha sacrifice was offered, a dakshina was given 10,001 cows; a Gargatriratra sacrifice was offered ...... the presents to the spectators and menials 301 dresses; a Gavamayana was offered, a dakshina was given 1,101 cows, a .... sacrifice, the dakshina 1,100 (?) cows, the presents to the spectators and menials . . Karshapanas, 100 dresses; an Aptoryama sacrifice .....
5. .....;a Gavamayana sacrifice was offered, a dakshina was given 1,101 cows; an Angirasamayana sacrifice was offered, a dakshina was given 1,101 cows; was given 1,101 cows; a Satatirata sacrifice ...... 100 .........; ......sacrifice was offered, the dakshina 1,100 cows; an Angirasatriratra sacrifice was offered; the dakshina .... cows ....
6. ........ 1,002 cows; a Chhandomapavamanatriratra sacrifice was offered, the dakshina ....; a ....... ratra sacrifice was offered, a dakshina was given; a ...... tra sacrifice was offered, a dakshina ...; a ..... sacrifice was offered, a dakshina was given 1,001 cows
7. ..........; a dakshina was given ..... cows ........; an Angirasamayana, of six years ......., a dakshina was given, 1,000 cows ..... was given 1,001 cows, thirteen ........
8. ........... a Trayoclasaratra ......... a dakshina was given, .... cows ......... a Dasaratra .... a ...... sacrifice, a dakshina was given 1,001 cows....

==== Right wall translation with interpolation ====
1. Used for conveying a mountain of grain, 1 excellent dress, 1 horse, 1 horse-chariot, 100 kine. A second horse-sacrifice was offered; dakshina were given (consisting of) 1 horse with silver trappings, 12 golden...... an(other) dakshina was given (consisting of) 14,000 (?) Karshapanas, 1 village . . elephant, a dakshina was given
2. ....cows, the cart used for conveying a mountain of grain..... an..... Ovaya sacrifice.......... 17 milch cows (?)....
3. ........ 17 ....... presents to the spectators were given.... a dakshina was given (consisting of) 12..... 1 (set of) silver ornaments for them, an(other) dakshina was given consisting of 10,000 Karshapanas............
4. ..... 20,000(?) cows; a Bhagala-Dasharatha sacrifice was offered, a dakshina was given (consisting of) 10,001 cows; a Gargatriratra sacrifice was offered ...... the presents to the spectators and menials (consisted of) 301 dresses; a Gavamayana was offered, a dakshina was given (consisting of) 1,101 cows, a .... sacrifice, the dakshina (consisted of) 1,100 (?) cows, the presents to the spectators and menials (consisted of) . . Karshapanas, 100 dresses; an Aptoryama sacrifice (was offered).....
5. .....;a Gavamayana sacrifice was offered, a dakshina was given (consisting of) 1,101 cows; an Angirasamayana sacrifice was offered, a dakshina was given (of) 1,101 cows; (a dakshina) was given (consisting of) 1,101 cows; a Satatirata sacrifice ...... 100 .........; ......sacrifice was offered, the dakshina (consisted of) 1,100 cows; an Angirasatriratra sacrifice was offered; the dakshina (consisted of) .... cows ....
6. ........ 1,002 cows; a Chhandomapavamanatriratra sacrifice was offered, the dakshina ....; a ....... ratra sacrifice was offered, a dakshina was given; a ...... tra sacrifice was offered, a dakshina ...; a ..... sacrifice was offered, a dakshina was given (consisting of) 1,001 cows
7. ..........; a dakshina was given (consisting of) ..... cows ........; an Angirasamayana, of six years (duration) ......., a dakshina was given, (consisting of) 1,000 cows ..... (a sacrificial fee) was given (consisting of) 1,001 cows, thirteen ........
8. ........... a Trayoclasaratra ......... a dakshina was given, (consisting of) .... cows ......... a Dasaratra .... a ...... sacrifice, a dakshina was given (consisting of) 1,001 cows....

=== Back wall relief and names ===
Regnal inscriptions
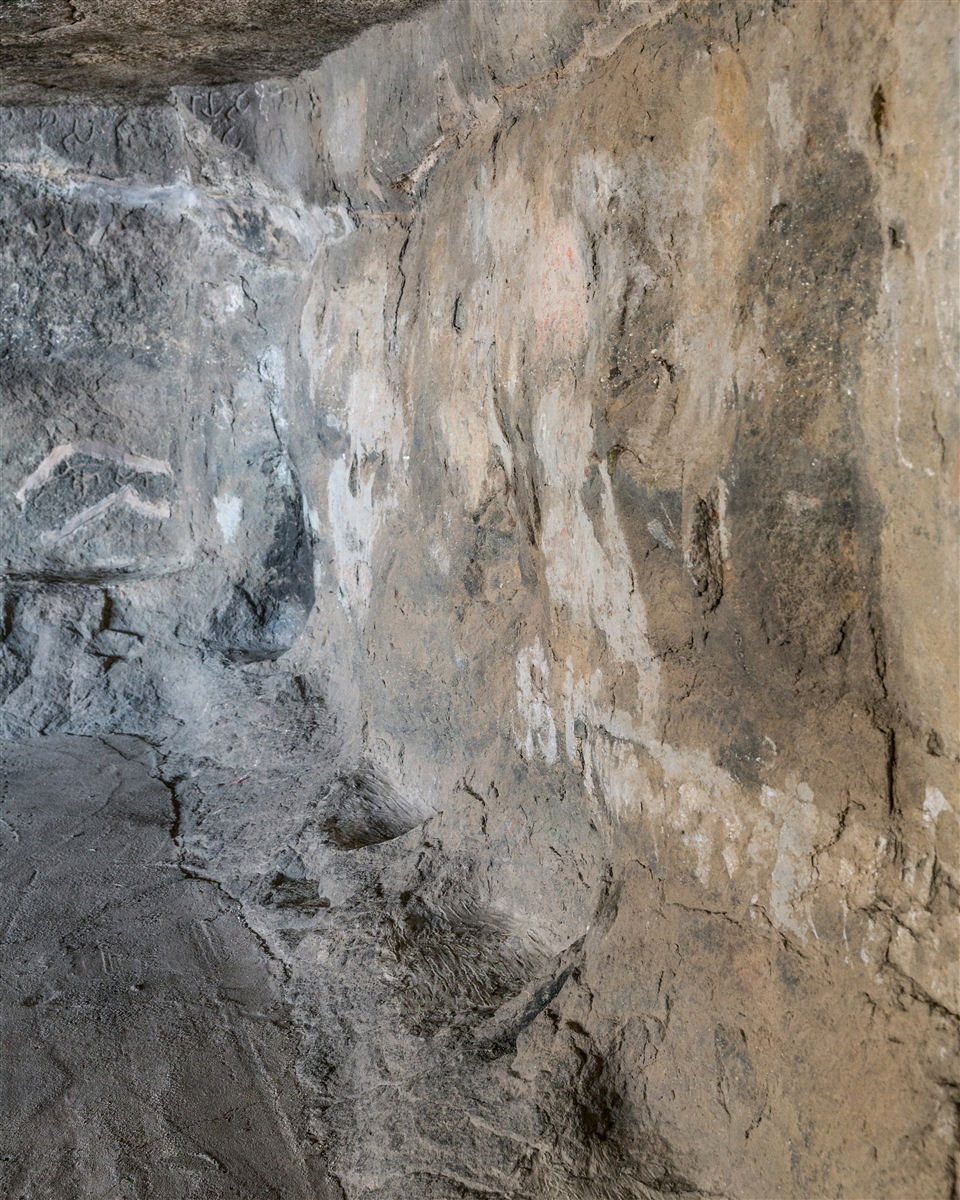
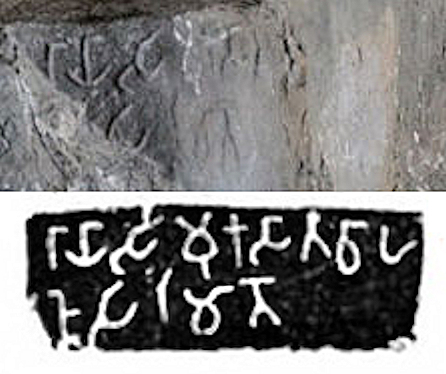
The back wall, with regnal inscriptions (left). At right: "Simuka" portion of the inscription (photograph and rubbing) in early Brahmi script:
𑀭𑀸𑀬𑀸 𑀲𑀺𑀫𑀼𑀓 𑀲𑀸𑀢𑀯𑀸𑀳𑀦𑁄 𑀲𑀺𑀭𑀺𑀫𑀢𑁄
Rāyā Simuka - Sātavāhano sirimato
"King Simuka Satavahana, the illustrious one"

The back wall of the cave has a niche with eight life-size relief sculptures. These sculptures are gone, but they had Brahmi script inscriptions above them that help identify them.

1. Raya Simuka - Satavahano sirimato
2. Devi-Nayanikaya rano cha
3. Siri-Satakanino
4. Kumaro Bhaya ........
5. (unclear)
6. Maharathi Tranakayiro.
7. Kumaro Hakusiri
8. Kumaro Satavahano

== Reception and significance ==
The Nanaghat inscription has been a major finding. According to Georg Bühler, it "belongs to the oldest historical documents of Western India, are in some respects more interesting and important than all other cave inscriptions taken together".

The inscription mentions both Balarama (Samkarshana) and Vāsudeva-Krishna, along with the Vedic deities of Indra, Surya, Chandra, Yama, Varuna and Kubera. This provided the link between Vedic tradition and the Hinduism . Given it is inscribed in stone and dated to 1st-century BCE, it also linked the religious thought in the post-Vedic centuries in late 1st millennium BCE with those found in the unreliable highly variant texts such as the Puranas dated to later half of the 1st millennium CE. The inscription is a reliable historical record, providing a name and floruit to the Satavahana dynasty.

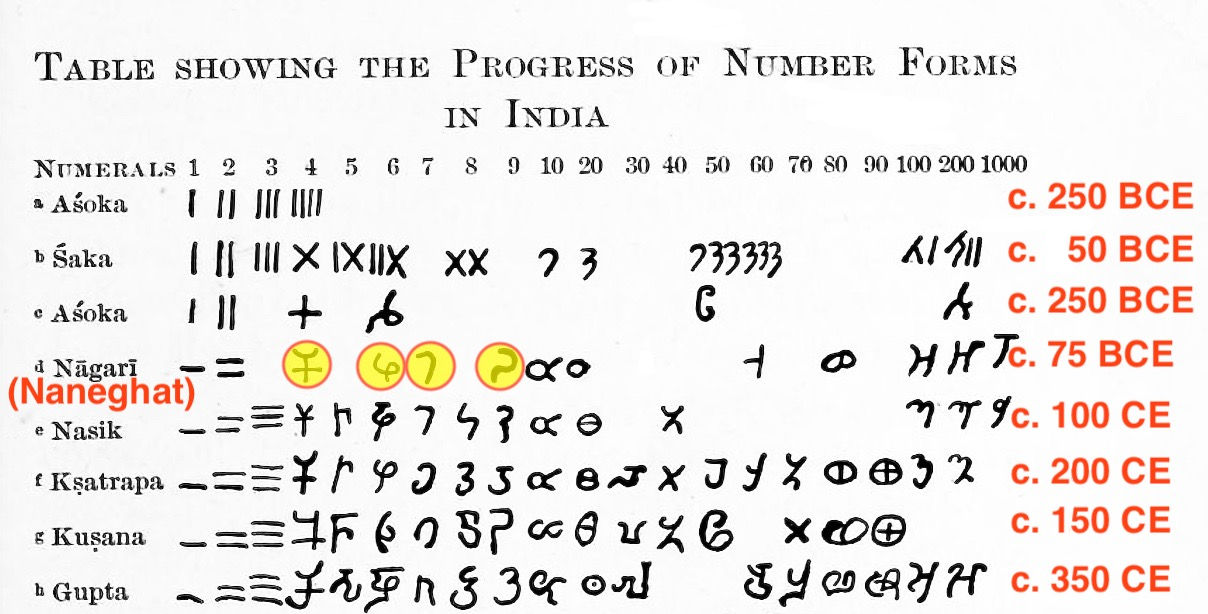
1911 sketch of numerals history in ancient India, with the Naneghat inscription shapes.

The Naneghat inscriptions have been important to the study of history of numerals. Though damaged, the inscriptions mention numerals in at least 30 places. They present the world's oldest known numeration symbols for "2, 4, 6, 7, and 9" that resemble modern era numerals, particularly the modern Nāgarī script . The numeral values used in the Naneghat cave confirm that the point value had not developed in India by the 1st century BCE.

The inscription is also evidence and floruit that Vedic ideas were revered in at least the northern parts of the Deccan region before the 1st-century BCE. They confirm that Vedic srauta sacrifices remained in vogue among the royal families through at least the 1st-century BCE. The Naneghat cave is also evidence that Hindu dynasties had sponsored sculptures by the 1st-century BCE, and secular life-size murti (pratima) tradition was already in vogue by then. (Note: The eight statues were missing when William Sykes visited the cave in 1833.)

According to Susan Alcock, the Naneghat inscription is important for chronologically placing the rulers and royal lineage of the Satavahana Empire. It is considered on palaeographical grounds to be posterior to the Nasik Caves inscription of Kanha dated to 100-70 BCE. Thus, Naneghat inscription helps place Satakarni I after him, and Satavahanas as a Hindu dynasty whose royal lineage performed many Vedic sacrifices.

== See also ==
- Hindu temple
- Kanheri Caves
