= Bhagavata Sampradaya =

Ancient Indian religious tradition

Bhagavata
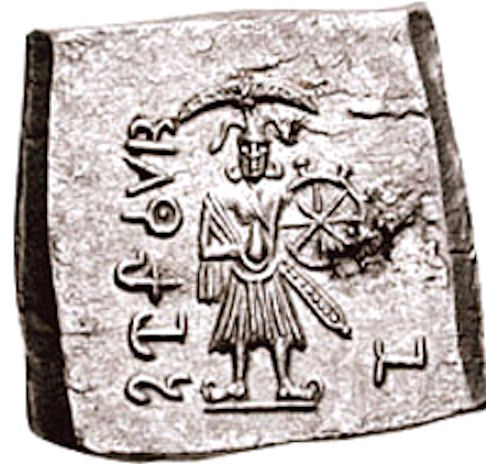
Historically, the Bhagavatas worshipped Vāsudeva-Krishna. An early depiction of Vāsudeva-Krishna on a coin of Agathocles of Bactria, 190–180 BCE.

The Bhagavata (/ˈbɑːɡəˌvɑːtə/; Sanskrit: भागवत, IAST: Bhāgavata [bʱɑ́ːɡɐʋɐtɐ]) Sampradāya (or Bhāgavata Dharma) is an ancient Vaishnava tradition centered on devotion (bhakti) to the Supreme Reality (svayam bhagavan) revealed as Bhagavān Vāsudeva-Kṛṣṇa, which originated in the region of Mathura. Integrating Vedic traditions of Vishnu and Narayana with devotion to Vāsudeva-Kṛṣṇa, the Bhāgavata tradition expanded across the Indian subcontinent by the second century BCE.

The Bhāgavata tradition developed as part of the broader emergence of popular theistic movements in ancient India. This propagated devotional worship that contrasted with large-scale Vedic ritual sacrifices. Early epigraphic and literary records such as Pāṇini's Aṣṭādhyāyī (4.3.98) document the worship of Bhagavān Vāsudeva among the Vṛṣṇis in the region of Mathura. It later assimilated into the concept of Narayana where Krishna is conceived as svayam bhagavan. Some historians date the formal worship of Krishna to the 1st century BCE, while Vaishnava tradition dates its origins earlier to around 4th century BCE. In texts such as Bhagavd Gita, the Bhāgavata tradition presents Vāsudeva-Krishna not merely as an incarnation of Vishnu, but as Supreme Being himself.

== Definition of Krishnaism ==
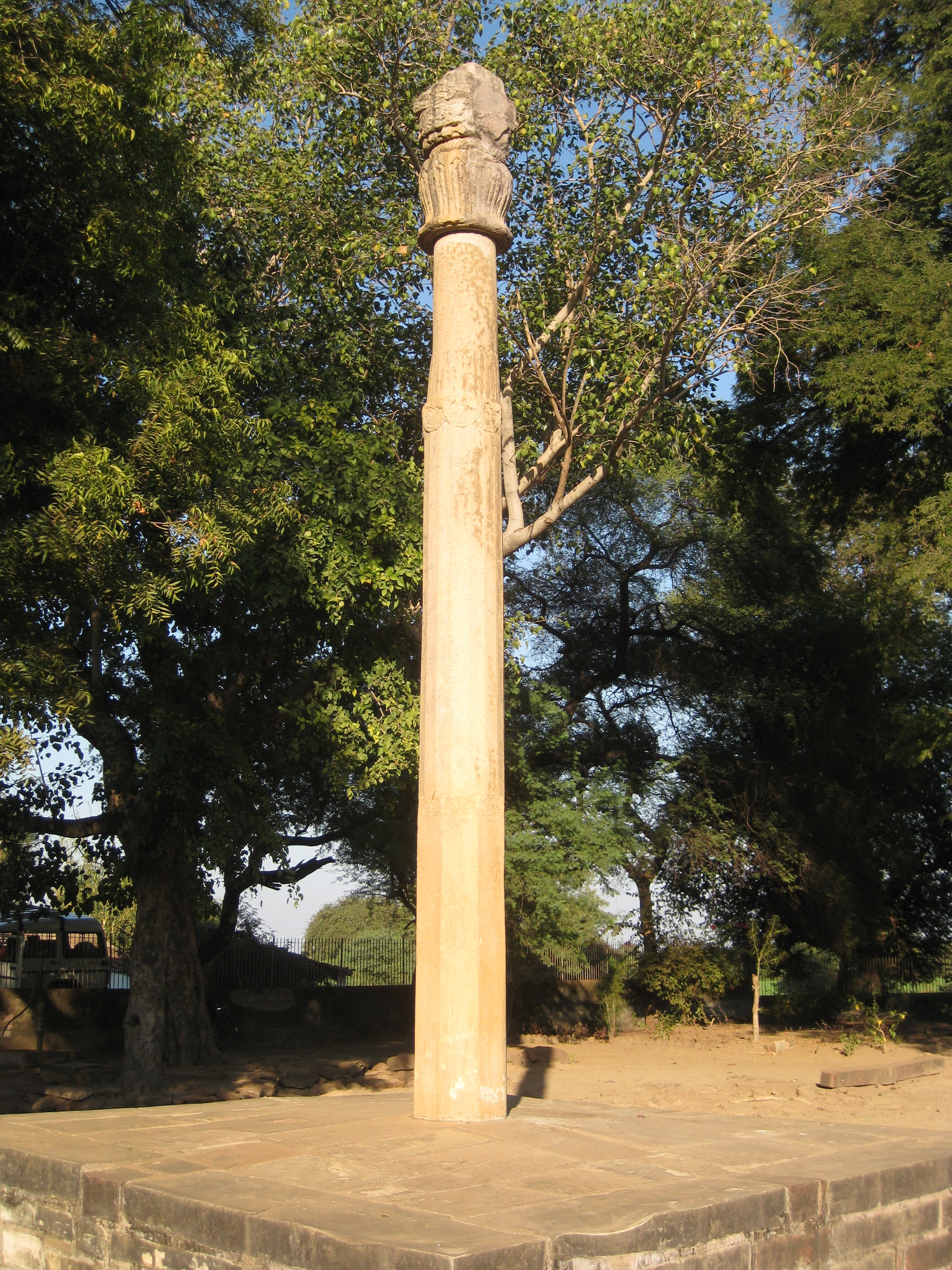
The Heliodorus pillar, dedicated by a Greek ambassador from the court of Indo-Greek king Antialcidas circa 100 BCE, contains the first known inscription related to the Bhagavata tradition in India.

By the ninth century CE, the Bhāgavata tradition was already at least a millennium old with diverse communities adhering to the teachings of the Bhagavata Purana. Various lineages of Gopala worshipers developed into distinct traditions. These lineages share basic beliefs and practices, resulting in scholars using the umbrella term Krishnaism. Today the tradition has a significant following worldwide. Pilgrimage centers associated with Krishna, such as Vrindavan, attract millions of devotees annually for festivals depicting events from Krishna's life on earth. Some believe that early Bhāgavata tradition was enriched and transformed with powerful and popular Krishna tradition with a strong "human" element to it.

== Initial History of Bhagavata tradition ==
The Bhāgavata tradition refers to Bhagavān as the Supreme Being endowed with all transcendental opulences (ṣaḍ-aiśvarya) and the devotee offers loving devotion (bhakti-yoga) to Him, as explained in texts such as the Bhagavad Gita and the Bhagavata Purana. From a socioeconomic perspective, historian R.S. Sharma proposed an alternate materialist etymology, suggesting that Narayana is considered a giver of good fortune, where the idea of bhaga (share) formed the basis of devotion to deity (bhakti).

By the second century BCE, Vishnu—a deity mentioned in the Rigveda—was integrated with Narayana and came to be known as Narayana-Vishnu. These devotional streams and their associated theological frameworks converged over time. Bhagavata tradition also incorporated concepts from Sāṁkhya philosophy, including the term Puruṣa to describe the supreme deity, alongside names such as Narayana for Vāsudeva-Krishna.

== Second early stage ==
The association of Garuḍa with the title "Devadeva" ("God of Gods") for Vāsudeva on the Heliodorus pillar (c. 113 BCE) suggests the early integration of Vedic Viṣṇu motifs with the Bhāgavata tradition.. Inscriptions from Nāgari (Ghosundi) similarly attest to the joint reverence of Saṅkarṣaṇa and Vāsudeva as supreme divnine entities in early Vaishnavism. By fifth century CE, during the Gupta period, the term Vaishnava came into widespread use alongside Bhagavata to describe the devotees of Vishnu and Vāsudeva. Bhāgavata tradition would introduce the concept of the chatur-vyuhas, in which the four earthly emanations of Narayana were considered to be Vasudeva (Krishna) as the creator, Sankarsana (Balarama) as the preserver, Pradyumna as the destroyer, and Aniruddha as the aspect of intellect. The doctrines of Pancharatra Catur-vyuha and the Avatāra are combined in the tradition to explain how the Supreme Absolute manifests in both cosmic creation and incarnations in the world simultaneously.

Scholars note that during this phase, the Bhāgavata tradition explicitly took Upaniṣadic and Vedic reverence for Vishnu and Pancharatra Agama traditions, describing Vāsudeva Krishna as not different from the supreme cosmic reality (Brahman) and Narayana.

Gupta rulers from Chandragupta II onward and Vikramaditya were known as Parama–Bhagavatas (foremost devotees of Bhagavān) or Bhagavata Vaishnavas. The Bhagavata Purana describes the mature theology of the tradition, presenting Krishna as the ultimate focus of bhakti.

== Adoption in Tamilakam ==
Following the decline of Guptas, imperial patronage saw a shift in northern India. Rulers such as Harsha started supporting diverse religious traditions. Though the Bhagavata tradition still flourished in the north, its stronghold was now not the valley of the Ganges or Central India, but the Tamil country. In South India, the tradition flourished through the devotional poetry of the Alvars, whose Tamil hymns popularised devotion to Vishnu and Krishna across the region. Bhāgavata tradition had penetrated into the Deccan at least as early as the first century BCE. The Cilappatikaram and other ancient Tamil works describe temples dedicated to Krishna and his brother Balarama in cities such as Madurai and Kaveripattinam. The wide prevalence of Bhāgavata tradition in the far south is also testified to by the Bhagavata Purana which says that in the Kali Age, devoted worshippers of Narayana, though rare in some places, are to be found in large numbers in the Dravida country watered by the rivers Tamraparni, Kritamala, Kaveri, and the great stream (Periyar) flowing to the west. Yamunacharya, who laid the tenets of the Vishishtadvaita philosophy, has his works described as "a somewhat modified and methodical form of the ancient Bhagavata, Pancharatra, or Satvata religion". The Alvars played a central role in early Bhakti movement, which later influenced devotional traditions throughout the subcontinent

== Literary references ==
References to Vāsudeva also occur in early Sanskrit literature. Taittiriya Aranyaka (X, i,6) identifies him with Narayana and Vishnu. Pāṇini (c. fourth century BCE), in his Ashtadhyayi (4.3.98), explains the term (Shabda) "Vāsudevaka" as a Bhakta (devotee) of Vāsudeva. By the time extent redaction of the Mahabharata took shape, the traditions of Vasudeva-Krishna, Krishna-Gopala, and Narayana were fully identified with Vishnu.

A Gupta period research makes a "clear mention of Vāsudeva as the exclusive object of worship of a group of people", who are referred to as Bhagavatas.

In the Mahābhāṣya, the grammarian Patañjali (2nd century BCE) refers to the performance of plays, depicting the slaying of Kaṁsa by Vāsudeva (jaghāna kaṁsaṁ kila vāsudevaḥ), indicating that the legend was well established by his time. This "supposed earliest phase is thought to have been established from the sixth to the fifth centuries BCE at the time of Pāṇini, who in his Astadhyayi explained the word vāsudevaka as a bhakta, devotee, of Vāsudeva and it is believed that Bhagavata religion with the worship of Vāsudeva Krishna was at the root of the Vaishnavism in Indian history."

== See also ==
- Devi-Bhagavata Purana
- Nava rasas
- Bhagavan
- Rigvedic deities

== Sources ==
- Hastings, James Rodney (2003) [1908–26]. Encyclopedia of Religion and Ethics. Vol. 4 of 24 ( Behistun (continued) to Bunyan.). John A Selbie (2nd edition 1925–1940, reprint 1955 ed.). Edinburgh: Kessinger Publishing, LLC. p. 476. ISBN 0-7661-3673-6.
