= Caturvyūha =

Four emanations of Narayana in Hinduism

Caturvyūha
The "Four emanations"

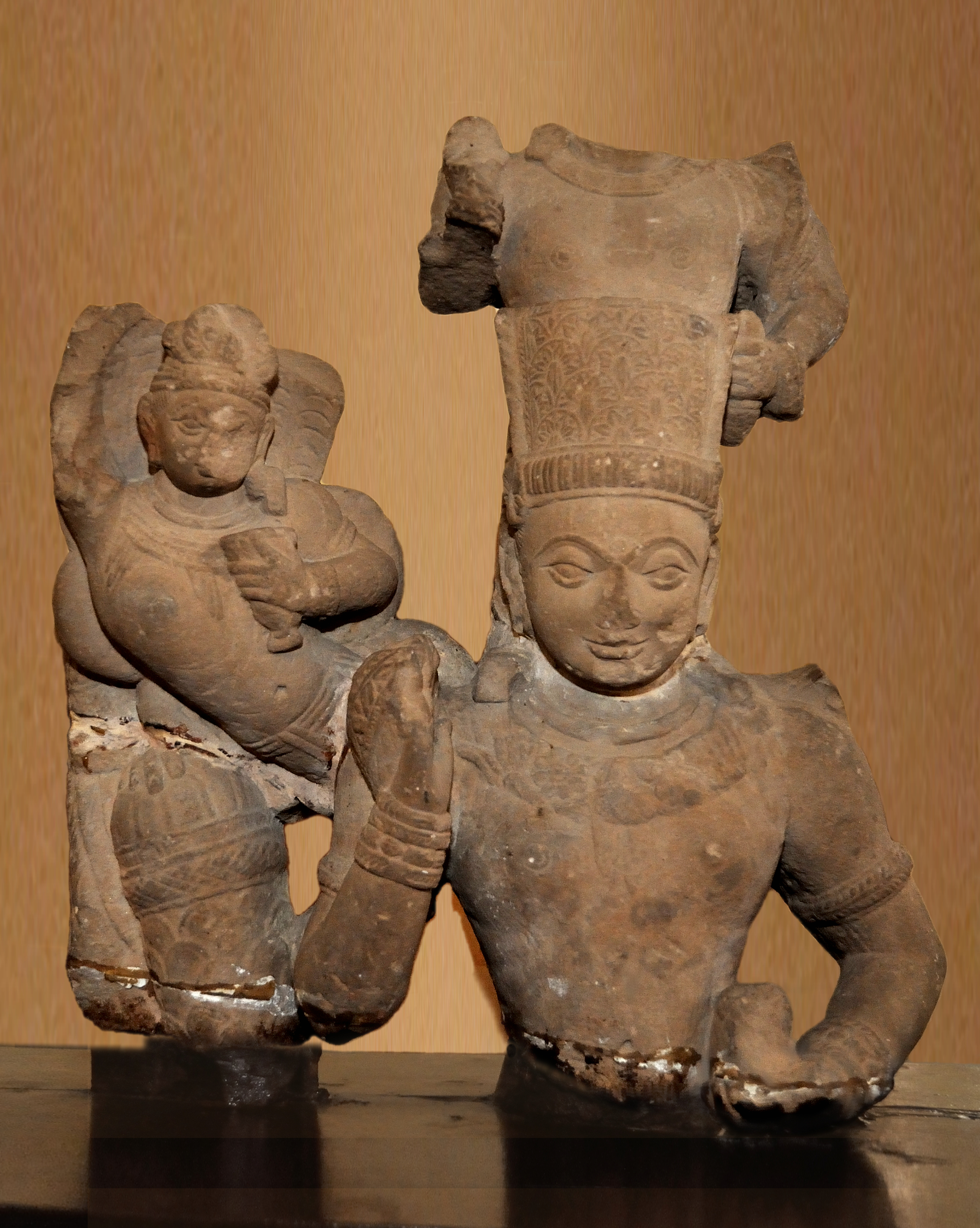
The Caturvyūha, showing the four emanation of Nārāyaṇa, or later Vishnu. 2nd century CE, Art of Mathura, Mathura Museum.
Front: Vāsudeva (center) and his kinsmen emanating from him. Vāsudeva is four-armed, and is fittingly in the center with his decorated heavy mace on the side and holding a conch, his elder brother Balarama to his right under a serpent hood, his son Pradyumna to his left (lost), and his grandson Aniruddha on top.

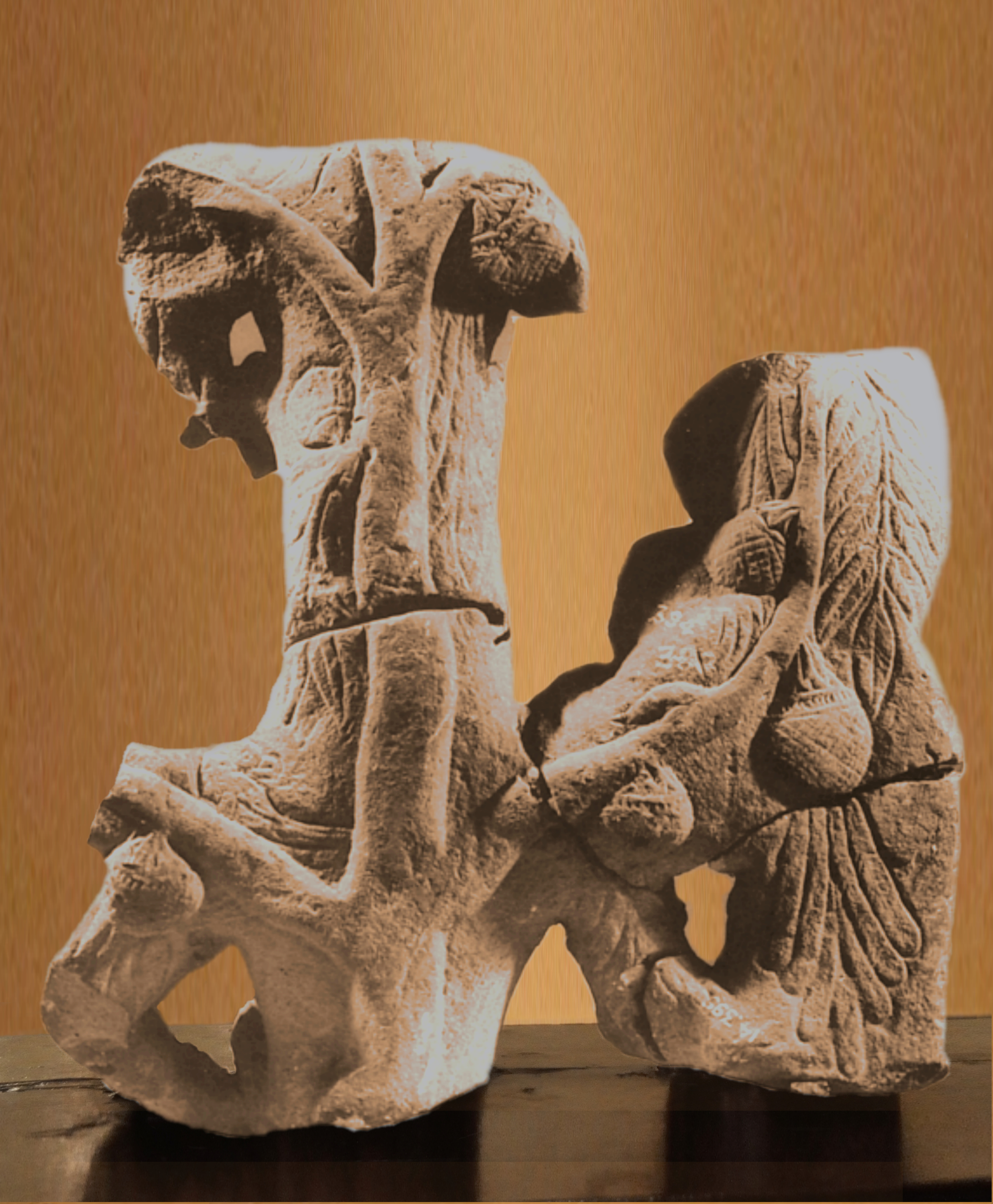
Back: Kadamba tree and branches showing their relationship. The back of the statue shows the trunk of a tree with branches, thus highlighting the genealogical relationship between the divinities.

Caturvyūha or Chatur-vyūha (Sanskrit: चतुर्व्यूह, romanized: Caturvyūha, lit. 'four emanations'), is an ancient Indian religious concept initially referring to the four earthly emanations (vyūhas) of the Supreme deity Nārāyaṇa, and later Viṣṇu. The first of these emanations identified with the hero-god Vāsudeva, with the other emanations being his kinsmen presented as extensions of Vāsudeva himself. From around the 1st century CE, the Vyuha doctrine (Vyūhavāda) developed out of the earlier Vīravāda cult of the Vrishni heroes, in which the five heroes Saṃkarṣaṇa, Vāsudeva, Pradyumna, Samba and Aniruddha had remained mostly human in character. Still later, around the 4th century CE, it evolved into the Avatāravāda system of incarnations of Vishnu, in which Vishnu was the primordial being and the Vrishni heroes had become his avatars.

== Concept and evolution ==
The four earthly emanations, or "Vyuhas", are identified as Samkarshana (Balarama-Samkarshana, son of Vasudeva by Devaki), Vāsudeva Krishna (son of Vasudeva by Devaki), Pradyumna (son of Vasudeva Krishna by Rukmini), and Aniruddha (son of Pradyumna). They are probably similar the legendary Vrishni heroes of the Mathura region, minus Samba (son of Vasudeva by Jambavati).

Originally, several of these earthly deities, particularly Vāsudeva, seem to have formed one of several major independent cults, together with the cults of Narayana, Lakshmi, before they later coalesced to form Vaishnavism. The actual cult of Vishnu only developed after these initial cults were established.

The heroes would then have evolved into Vaishnavite deities through a step-by-step process: 1) deification of the Vrishni heroes 2) association with the God Narayana-Vishnu 3) incorporation into the Vyuha concept of successive emanations of the God. Epigraphically, the deified status of Vāsudeva in particular is confirmed by his appearance on the coinage of Agathocles of Bactria (190-180 BCE) and by the devotional character of the Heliodorus pillar inscription (circa 110 BCE). Later, the association with Narayana (Vishnu) is suggested by the Hathibada Ghosundi Inscriptions of the 1st century BCE.

== Kushan Caturvyuha (2nd century BCE) ==
By the 2nd century CE, the "avatara concept was in its infancy", and the depiction of Vishnu with his four emanations (the Chatur-vyūha), consisting in the Vrishni heroes minus Samba, starts to become visible in art at the end of the Kushan period. Starting with the art of Mathura, Vāsudeva (avatar of Vishnu) fittingly appears in the center of the sculptural compositions, with his decorated heavy mace on the side and a conch shell in the hand, his elder brother Balarama to his right under a serpent hood and holding a drinking cup, his son Pradyumna to his left, and his grandson Aniruddha on top.

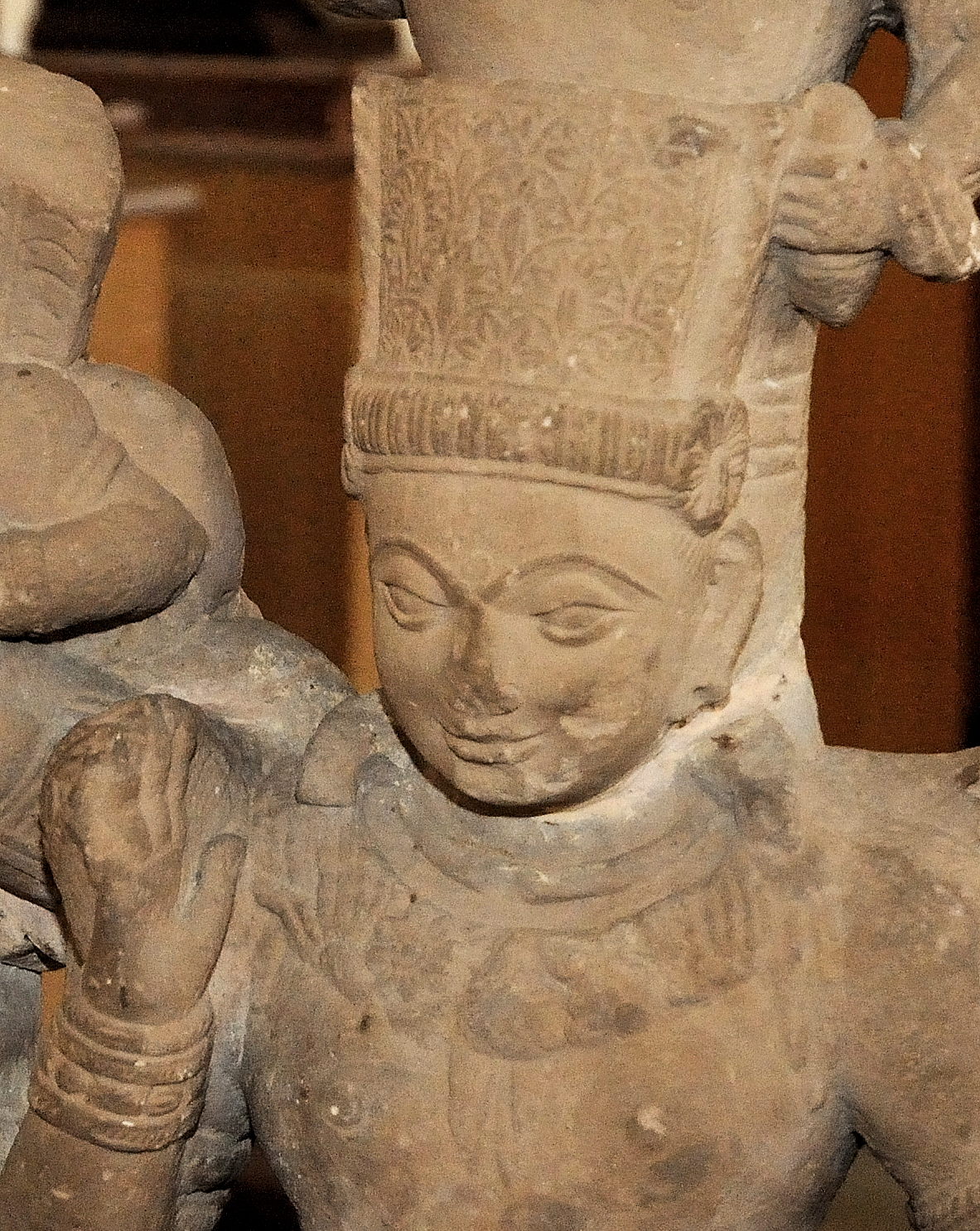
Vasudeva with ornate crown and flower necklace, making the Abhaya Mudra

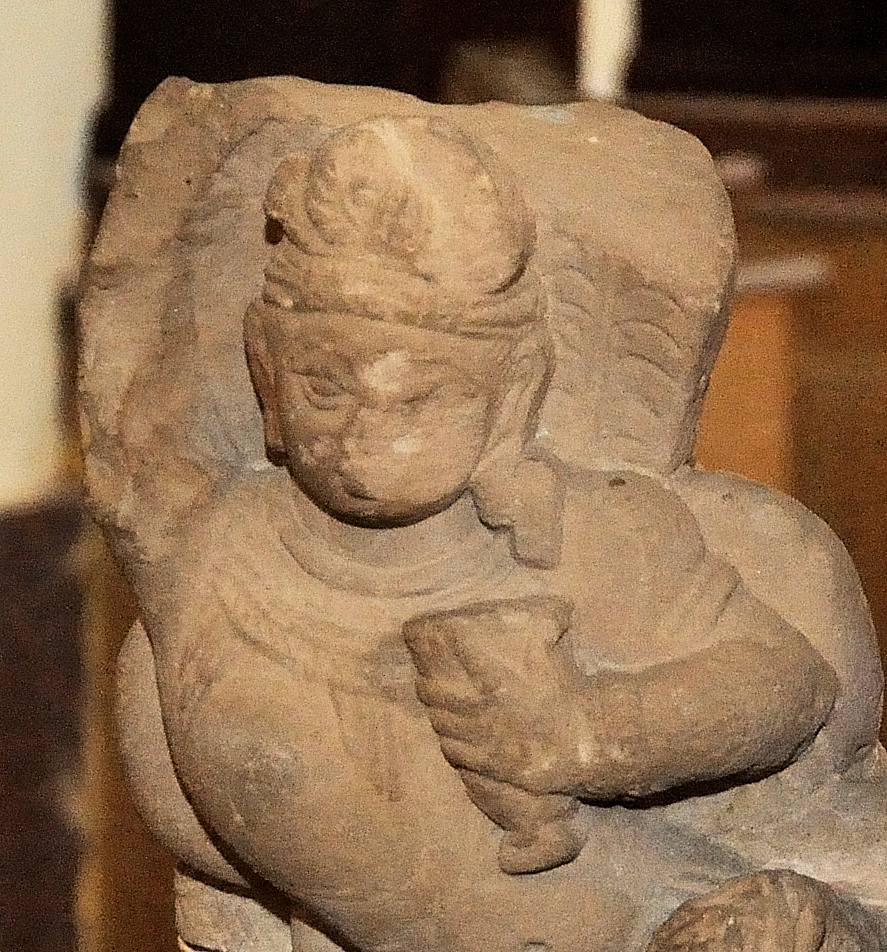
Samkarsana-Balarama under his snake hood holding a cup

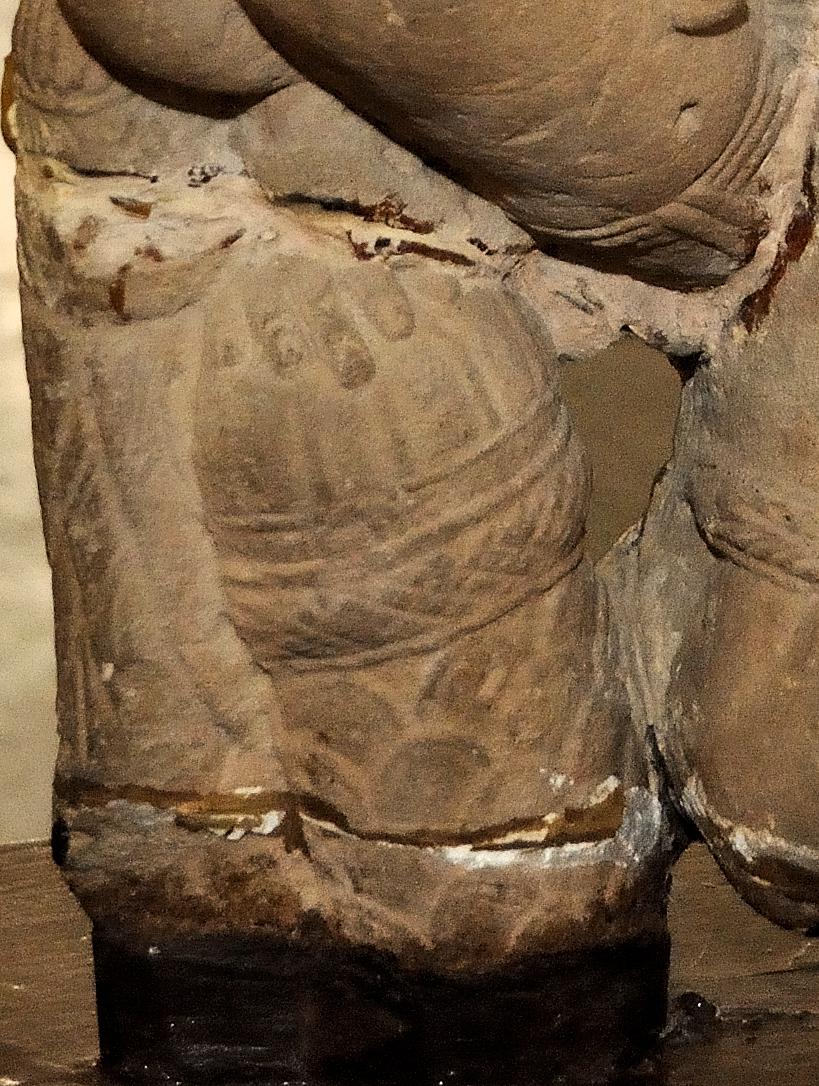
Vasudeva's mace held by one of his supplementary hands

== Possible Bhita Caturvyuha (2nd century BCE) ==
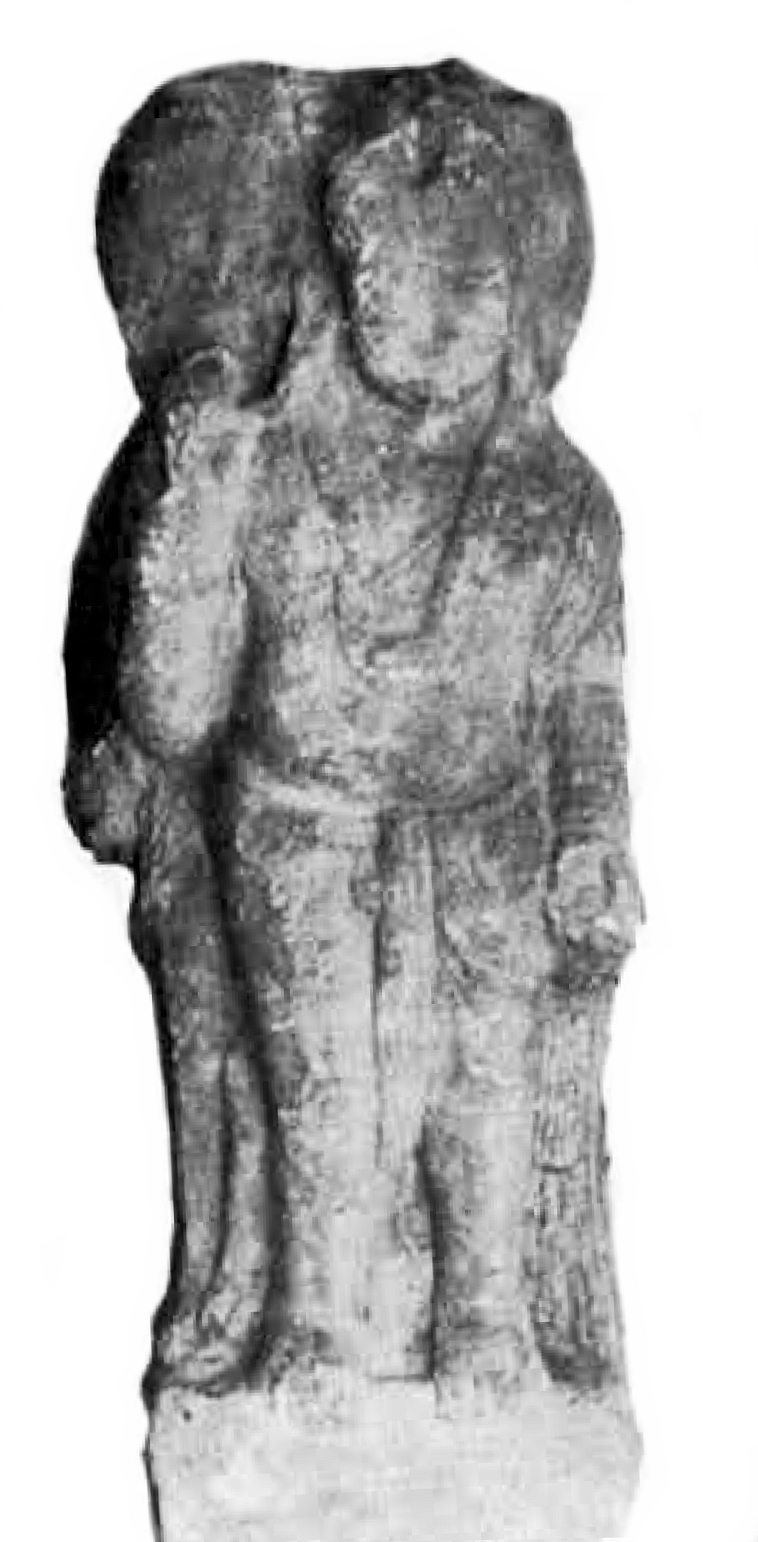
The Bhita statue in the Lucknow Museum, with four characters standing around a central axis, has also been proposed as a Caturvyuha. Vasudeva is standing at the front, and the seated lion, symbol of Samkarsana, is visible on the left.

An ancient statue from Bhita near Allahabad (25.308°N 81.794°E), with four figures facing in four directions, now in the Lucknow Museum, has been proposed to represent the Caturvyuha concept, although interpretations vary. It is dated to the 2nd century BCE on stylistic grounds, being quite similar in style to the monumental Yaksha statues.

The main figure is bigger than the others, wears a crown and earrings, as well as an ornate necklace and bracelets, and raises his hand in "abahaya mudra", a symbol of deification, and holds jar in the left hand. The figure would be Vāsudeva. To the proper right side of the crowned figure appears an unidentifiable face, and below it a seated lion. This part could identified with Samkarsana, combining anthropomorphic and theriomorphic characteristics, and later associated with Narasimha. On the proper left side of the crowned figure also appears an unidentifiable face, and below it a boar on a pedestal, standing on its hind legs, with the front legs joint in the namaskāra gesture of prayer and devotion. This could be Aniruddha, later identified with Varaha. The figure on the reverse is devoid of ornamentation, the hair is parted in the middle and falls loosely, but both arms are broken, making it impossible to identify their attributes. This could be Pradyumna, later associated with Rudra and the fierce-looking Kāpila.

This sculpture of the Caturvyuha shows the Vrishni heroes, but already associates them with their animal form. This seems to prefigure the Vaikuntha Chaturmurti, in which Vishnu, crowned with a halo, is also flanked by the images of Narasimha and Varaha, with Kāpila in back as seen in the examples from Kashmir.

The general style of the figures is quite similar to that of the early Yakshas, and it has been suggested that their role might have been understood as parallel: just as the Yakshas are considered as emanations of the Supreme deity Brahman, the four Vyuhas are similarly emanations of Narayana.
