= Saṃkarṣaṇa =

Legendary figure in ancient India

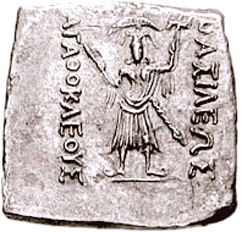
- Saṃkarṣaṇa on a coin of Agathocles of Bactria, c. 190-180 BCE. This is "the earliest unambiguous image" of the deity.
- Affiliation: Balarama, Vishnu

Genealogy
- Born: Mathura, Surasena (present-day Uttar Pradesh, India)
- Parents: Devaki (mother); Vasudeva Anakadundubhi (father)
- Siblings: Vāsudeva (younger brother); Subhadra (sister)

Saṃkarṣaṇa (IAST Saṃkarṣaṇa, "The Plougher") later known as Balarama, was a son of Vasudeva Anakadundubhi, king of the Vrishnis in the region of Mathura. He was a leading member of the Vrishni heroes, and may well have been an ancient historical ruler in the region of Mathura. The cult of Saṃkarṣaṇa with that of Vāsudeva is historically one of the earliest forms of personal deity worship in India, attested from around the 4th century BCE.

The cult of Vāsudeva and Saṃkarṣaṇa was one of the major independent cults, together with the cults of Narayana, Shri and Lakshmi, which later coalesced to form Vishnuism. According to the Vaishnavite doctrine of the avatars, Vishnu takes various forms to rescue the world, and Vāsudeva as well as Saṃkarṣaṇa became understood as some of these forms, and some of the most popular ones. This process lasted from the 4th century BCE when Vāsudeva and Saṃkarṣaṇa were independent deities, to the 4th century CE, when Vishnu became much more prominent as the central deity of an integrated Vaishnavite cult, with Vāsudeva and Saṃkarṣaṇa now only some of his manifestations.

In epic and Puranic lore Saṃkarṣaṇa was also known by the names of Rama, Baladeva, Balarama, Rauhineya or Halayudha, and is presented as the elder brother of Vāsudeva.

Initially, Saṃkarṣaṇa seems to hold precedence over his younger brother Vāsudeva, as he appears on the obverse on the coinage of king Agathocles of Bactria (c. 190-180 BCE), and usually first in the naming order as in the Ghosundi inscription. Later this order was reversed, and Vāsudeva became the most important deity of the two.

== Characteristics ==
=== Evolution as a deity ===
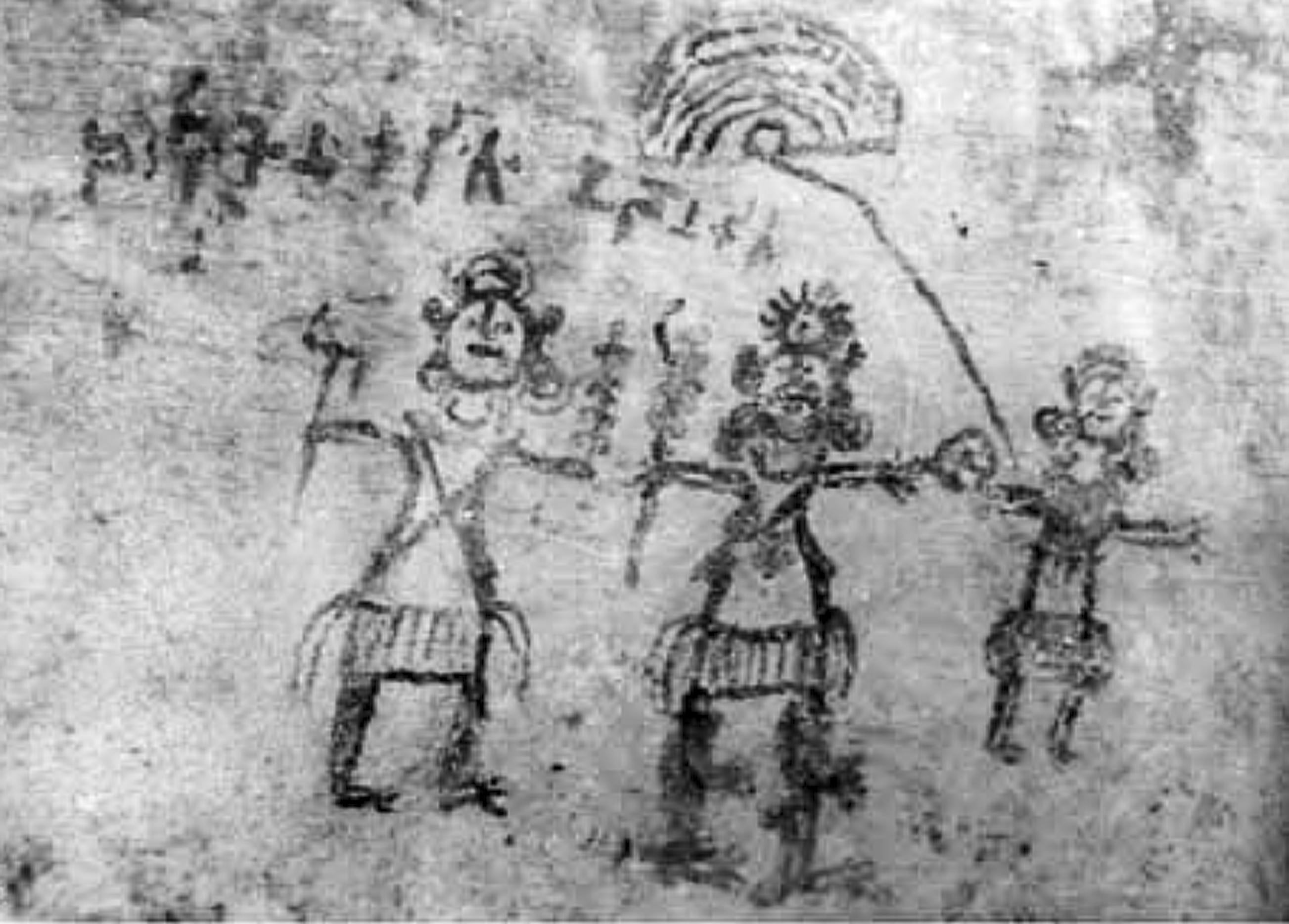
Saṃkarṣaṇa, Vāsudeva and the female Goddess Ekanamsha shown in a rock painting at Tikla, 3rd-2nd century BCE.

The belief of Vāsudeva and Saṃkarṣaṇa may have evolved from the worship of a historical figure belonging to the Vrishni clan in the region of Mathura. They are leading members of the five "Vrishni heroes".

It is thought that the hero deity Saṃkarṣaṇa may have evolved into a Vaishnavite deity through a step-by-step process: 1) deification of the Vrishni heroes, of whom Vāsudeva and Saṃkarṣaṇa were the leaders 2) association with the God Narayana-Vishnu 3) incorporation into the Vyuha concept of successive emanations of the God. Epigraphically, the deified status of Saṃkarṣaṇa is confirmed by his appearance on the coinage of Agathocles of Bactria (190-180 BCE). Later, the association of Saṃkarṣaṇa with Narayana (Vishnu) is confirmed by the Hathibada Ghosundi Inscriptions of the 1st century BCE. By the 2nd century CE, the "avatara concept was in its infancy", and the depiction of the four emanations of Vishnu (the Chatur-vyūha), consisting in the Vrishni heroes including Vāsudeva, Saṃkarṣaṇa and minus Samba, starts to become visible in the art of Mathura at the end of the Kushan period.

The Harivamsa describes intricate relationships between Krishna Vasudeva, Saṃkarṣaṇa, Pradyumna and Aniruddha that would later form a Vaishnava concept of primary quadrupled expansion, or chatur vyuha.

The name of Samkarsana first appears in epigraphy in the Nanaghat cave inscriptions and the Hathibada Ghosundi Inscriptions, both dated to the 1st century BCE. In these inscriptions, Samkarsana appears before Vasudeva, suggesting seniority and precedence.

==== Saṃkarṣaṇa symbolism at Besnagar (circa 100 BCE) ====
Saṃkarṣaṇa symbol at Besnagar
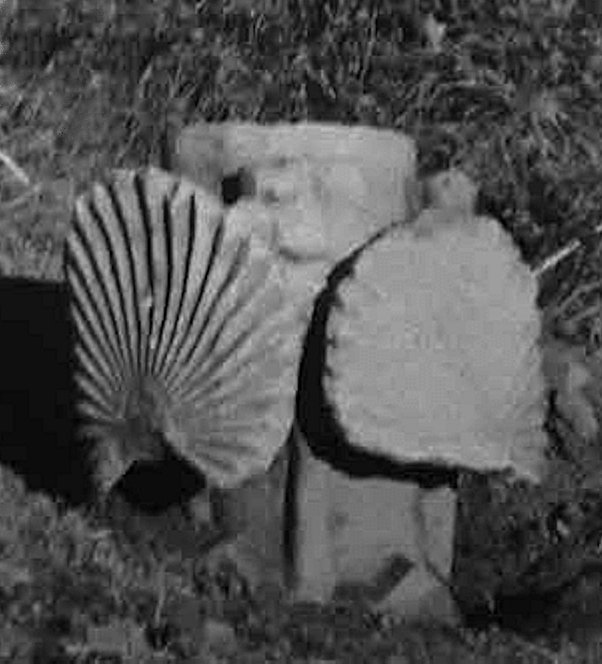
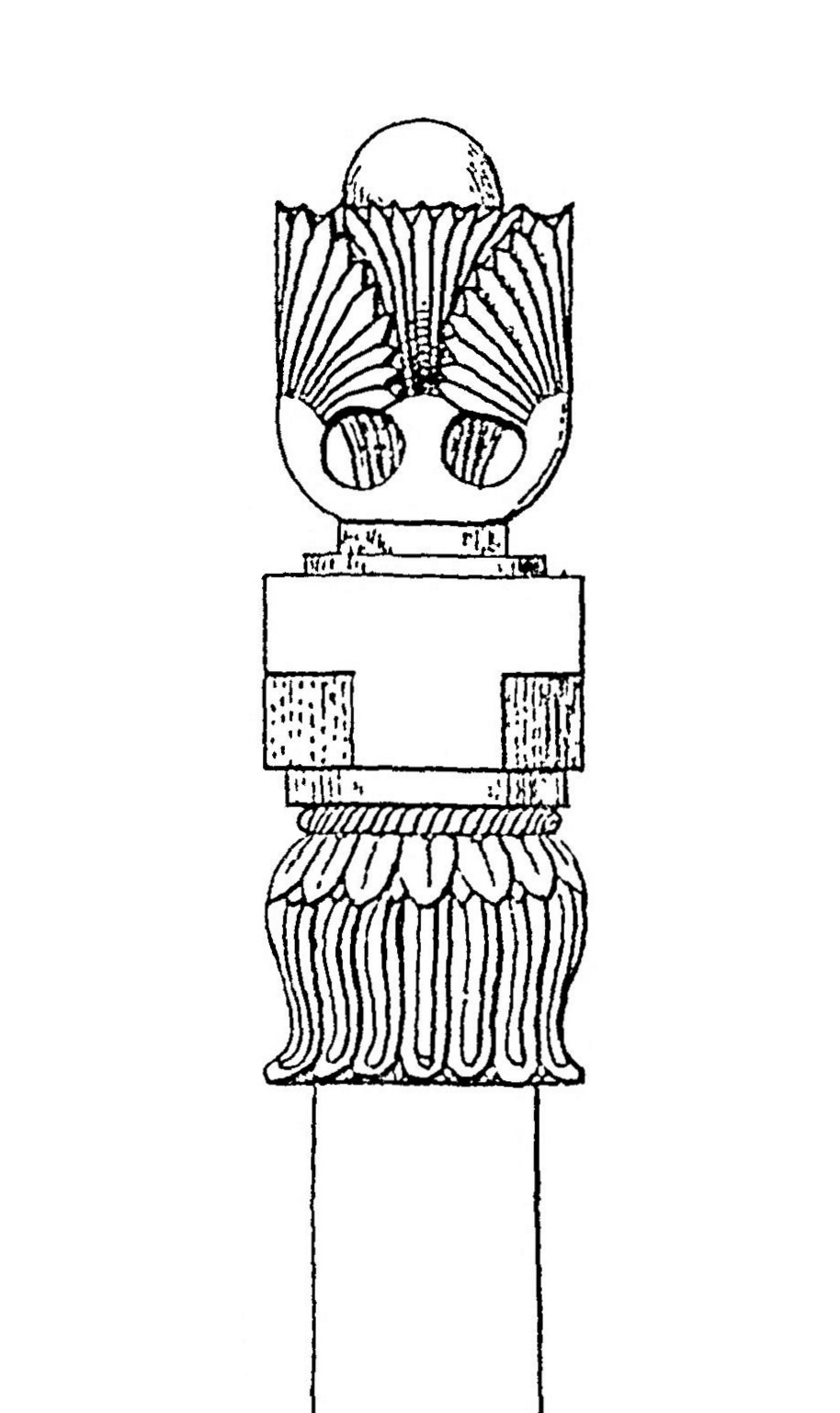
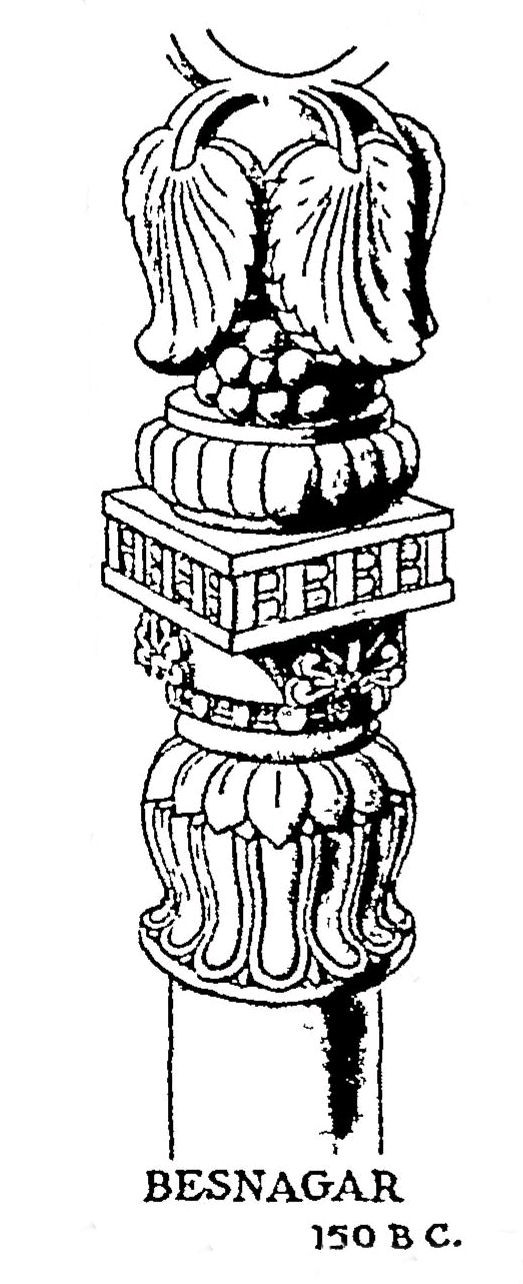
The fan-palm pillar capital, found near the Heliodorus pillar, is associated with Samkarsana.

Various sculptures and pillar capitals were found near the Heliodorus pillar in Besnagar, and it is thought they were dedicated to Vāsudeva's kinsmen, otherwise known as the Vrishni heroes and objects of the Bhagavata cult. These are a tala (fan-palm capital), a makara(crocodile) capital, a banyan-tree capital, and a possible statue of the goddess Lakshmi, also associated with the Bhagavat cult. Just as Garuda is associated with Vasudeva, the fan-palm capital is generally associated with Samkarsana, and the makara is associated with Pradyumna. The banyan-tree capital with ashtanidhis is associated with Lakshmi.

The presence of these pillar capitals, found near the Heliodorus pillar, suggests that the Bhagavata belief, although centered around the figures of Vāsudeva and Samkarsana, may also have involved the worship of other Vrishni deities.

In his theriomorphic form, Saṃkarṣaṇa is associated to the lion.

==== Parallels with Greek mythology ====
Saṃkarṣaṇa has been compared to the Greek god Dionysos, son of Zeus, as both are associated with the plough and with wine, as well as a liking for wrestling and gourmet food. Arrian in his Indika, quoting Megasthenes, writes of Dyonisos in India:

About Dionysos he writes: "Dionysos, however, when he came and had conquered the people, founded cities and gave laws to these cities, and introduced the use of wine among Indians, as he had done among the Greeks, and taught them to sow the land, himself supplying seeds for the purpose (...) It is also said that Dionysos first yoked oxen to the plough, and made many of the Indians husbandmen instead of nomads, and furnished them with the implements of agriculture; and that the Indians worship the other gods, and Dionysos himself in particular, with cymbals and drums, because he so taught them; and he also taught them the satiric dance, or, as the Greeks call it, the Kordax and that he instructed the Indians to let their hair grow long in honor of the god, and to wear the turban"

— Arrian, Indika, Chapter VII.

== Naneghat inscription (1st century BCE) ==
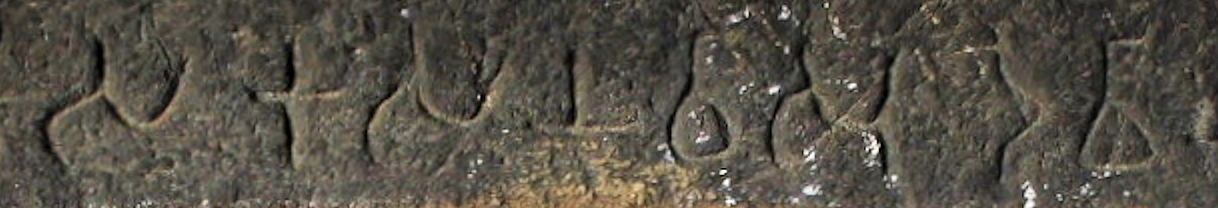
Samkasana (𑀲𑀁𑀓𑀲𑀦) and Vāsudeva (𑀯𑀸𑀲𑀼𑀤𑁂𑀯𑀸) in the Naneghat cave inscription

The Naneghat inscription, dated to the 1st century BCE, mentions both Samkarshana and Vāsudeva, along with the Vedic deities of Indra, Surya, Chandra, Yama, Varuna and Kubera. This provided the link between Vedic tradition and the Vaishnava tradition. Given it is inscribed in stone and dated to 1st-century BCE, it also linked the religious thought in the post-Vedic centuries in late 1st millennium BCE with those found in the unreliable highly variant texts such as the Puranas dated to later half of the 1st millennium CE. The inscription is a reliable historical record, providing a name and floruit to the Satavahana dynasty.

== Gosundi inscription ==
Vāsudeva and Saṃkarṣaṇa are also mentioned in the 1st century BCE Hathibada Ghosundi Inscriptions in association with Narayana:

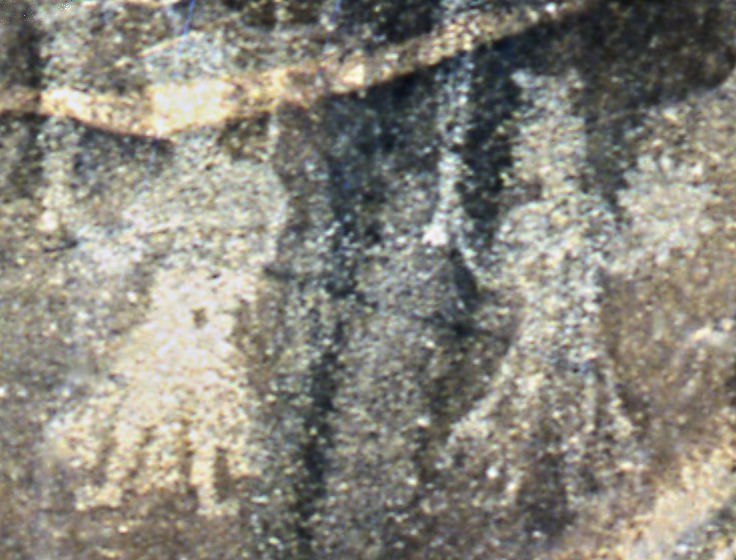
Saṃkarṣaṇa ((Bala)rama) and Krishna with their attributes at Chilas. The Kharoshthi inscription nearby reads Rama [kri]ṣa. 1st century CE.

(This) enclosing wall round the stone (object) of worship, called Narayana-vatika (Compound) for the divinities Samkarshana-Vasudeva who are unconquered and are lords of all (has been caused to be made) by (the king) Sarvatata, a Gajayana and son of (a lady) of the Parasaragotra, who is a devotee of Bhagavat (Vishnu or Samkarshana/Vāsudeva) and has performed an Asvamedha sacrifice.

– Ghosundi Hathibada Inscriptions, 1st-century BCE

== Chilas petroglyphs ==
At Chilas II archeological site dated to the first half of 1st-century CE in northwest Pakistan, near the Afghanistan border, are engraved two males along with many Buddhist images nearby. The larger of the two males holds a plough and club in his two hands. The artwork also has an inscription with it in Kharosthi script, which has been deciphered by scholars as Rama-Krsna, and interpreted as an ancient depiction of the two brothers Saṃkarṣaṇa and Krishna.

== Saṃkarṣaṇa in Indo-Scythian coinage (1st century BCE) ==
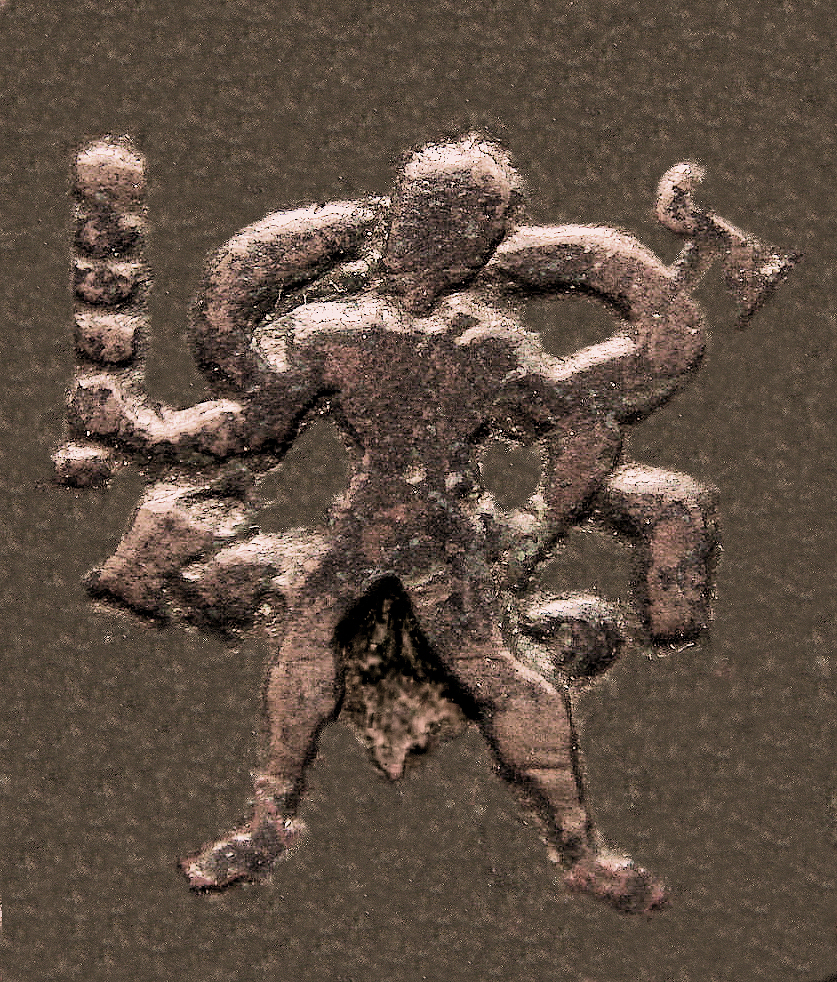
Saṃkarṣaṇa-Balarama with mace and plough, striding forward with billowing scarf, on the coinage of Maues (90-80 BCE).

Samkarshana, the Vrishni elder and the leading divinity until the rise to precedence of Vāsudeva, is known to appear on the coinage of the Indo-Scythian rulers Maues and Azes I during the 1st century BCE. These coins show him holding a mace and a plough.

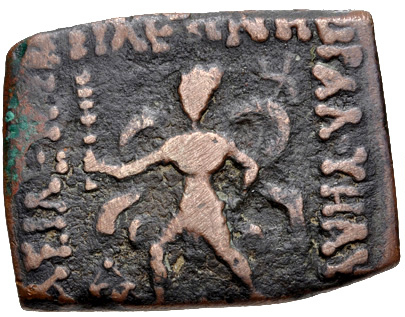
Samkarsana-Balarama on a coin of Maues (90-80 BCE)

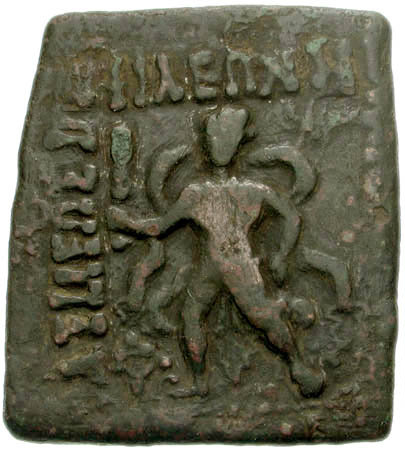
Samkarsana-Balarama on a coin of Maues (90-80 BCE)

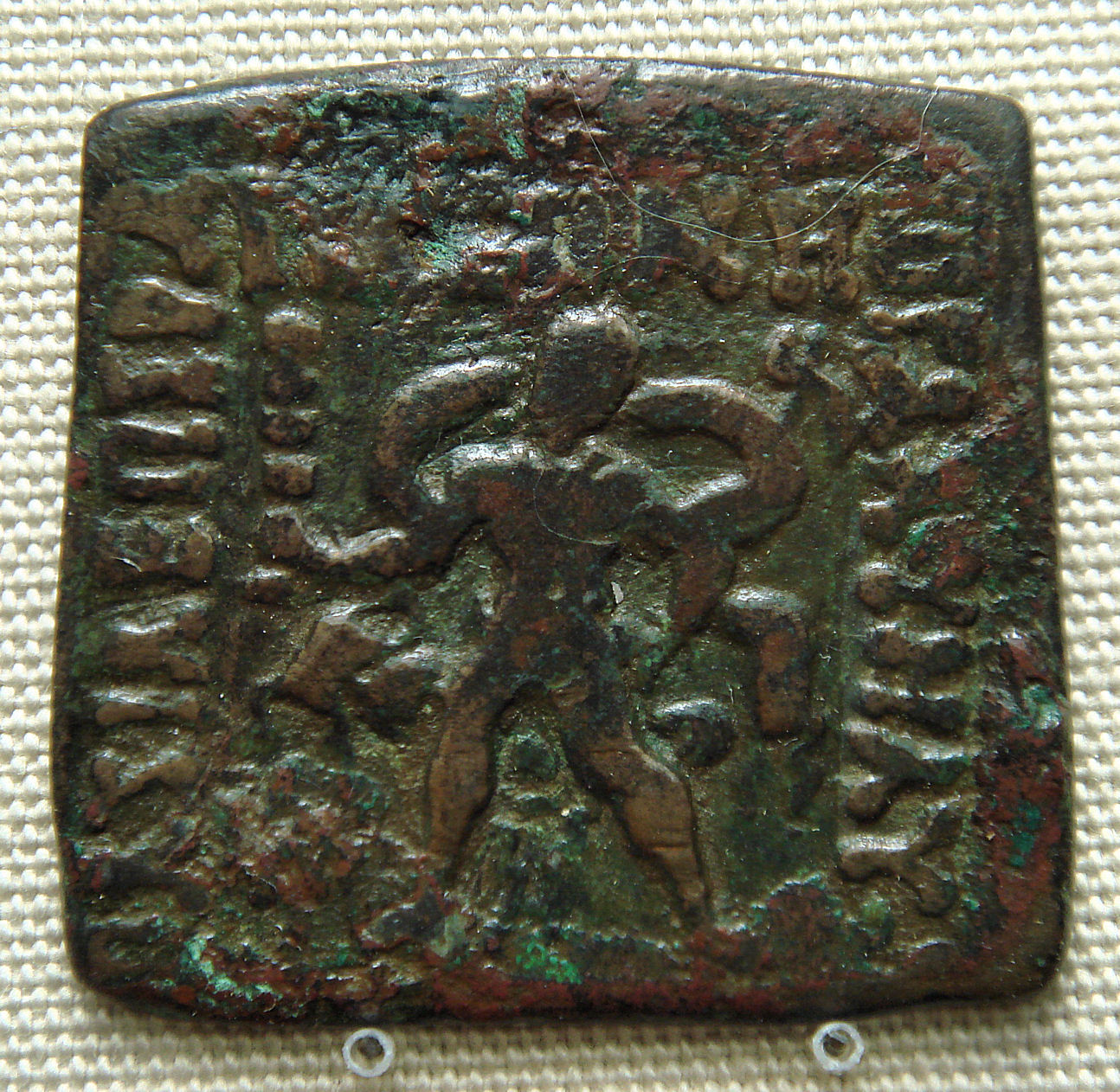
Samkarsana-Balarama on a coin of Maues (90-80 BCE)

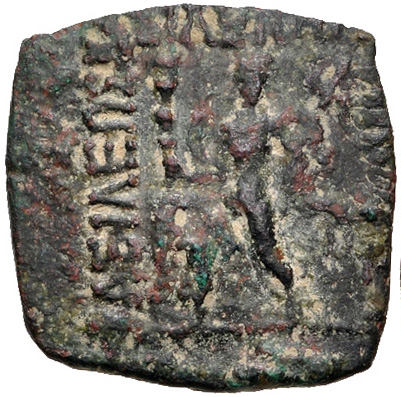
Samkarsana-Balarama on a coin of Azes (58-12 BCE)

== Saṃkarṣaṇa in 2nd century CE sculpture ==
Saṃkarṣaṇa-Balarama in the Caturvyūha
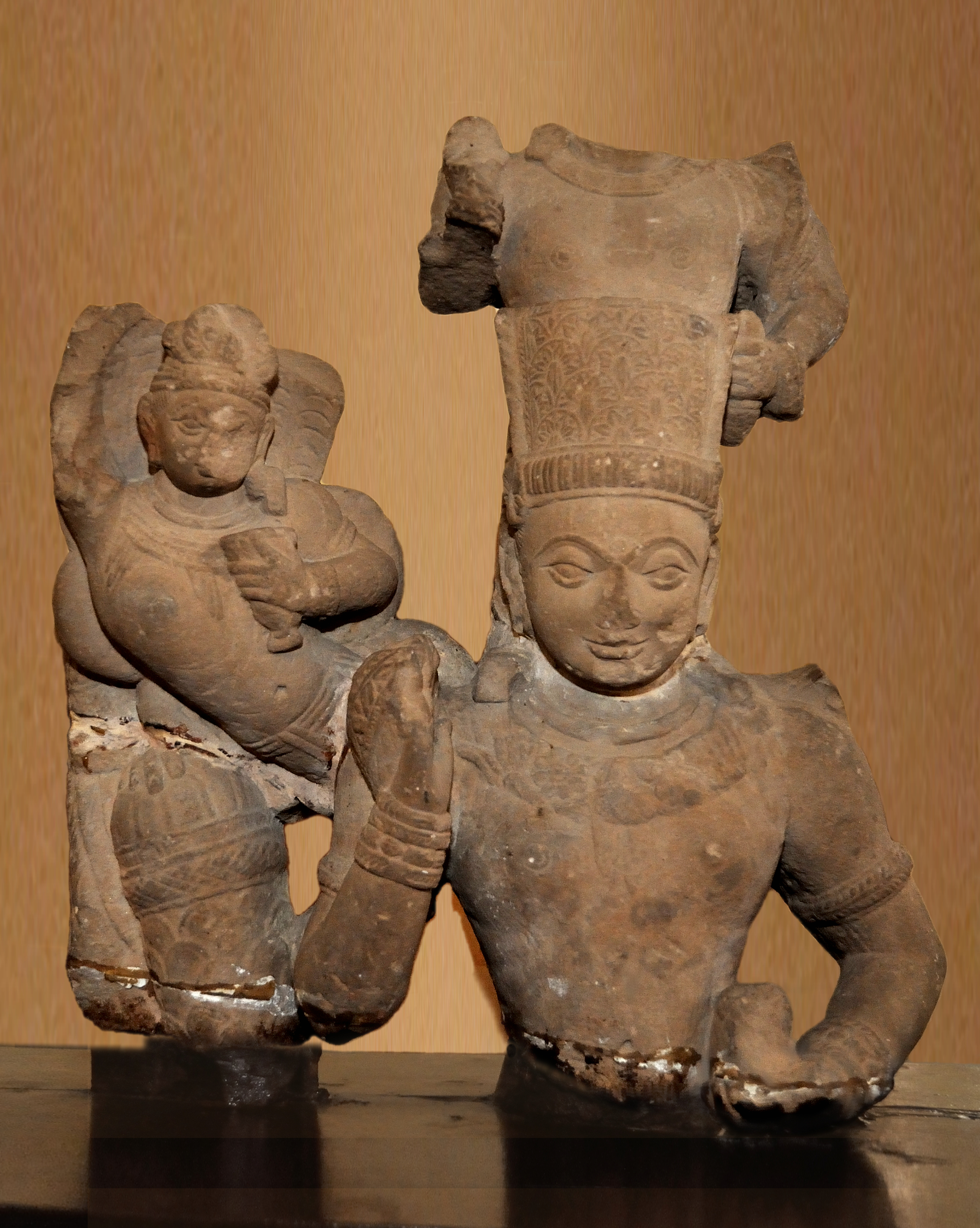
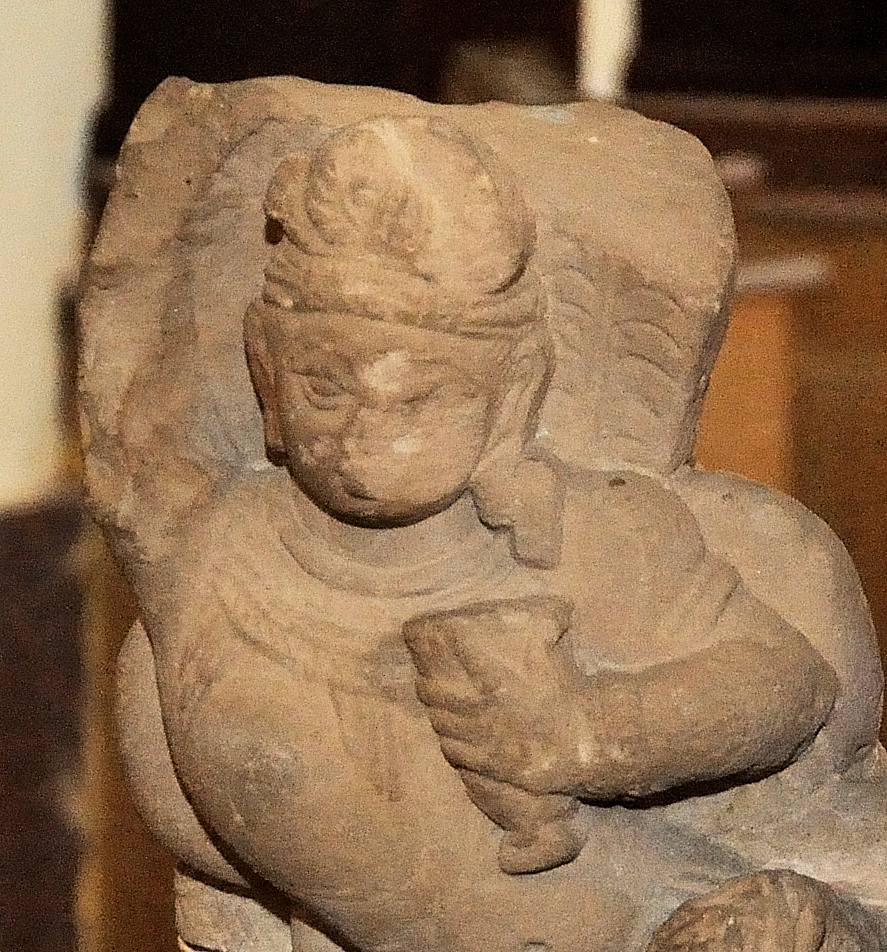
The "Caturvyūha": Vāsudeva and other members of the Vrishni clan. Vāsudeva (emanation of Narayana) is four-armed and is fittingly in the center with his heavy decorated mace on the side and holding a conch, his elder brother Saṃkarṣaṇa-Balarama to his right under a serpent hood, his son Pradyumna to his left (lost), and his grandson Aniruddha on top. 2nd century CE, Mathura Museum.

Some sculptures during this period suggest that the concept of the avatars was starting to emerge, as images of "Chatur-vyuha" (the four emanations of Narayana) are appearing. The famous "Caturvyūha" statue in Mathura Museum is an attempt to show in one composition Vāsudeva together with the other members of the Vrishni clan of the Pancharatra system: Saṃkarṣaṇa, Pradyumna and Aniruddha, with Samba missing, Vāsudeva being the central deity from whom the others emanate. The back of the relief is carved with the branches of a Kadamba tree, symbolically showing the relationship being the different deities. The depiction of Vishnu was stylistically derived from the type of the ornate Bodhisattvas, with rich jewelry and ornate headdress.

== Saṃkarṣaṇa in the Kondamotu relief (4th century CE) ==
Saṃkarṣaṇa appears prominently in a relief from Kondamotu, Guntur district in Andhra Pradesh, dating to the 4th century CE, which shows the Vrishni heroes standing in genealogical order around Narasimha. Saṃkarṣaṇa stands to the left in the place of seniority, holding a mace and a ploughshare topped by the depiction of a lion, followed by Vāsudeva, with a hand in abhaya mudra and the other hand on the hip holding a conch shell. Vāsudeva also has a crown, which distinguishes him from the others. Then follow Pradyumna, holding a bow and an arrow, Samba, holding a wine goblet, and Aniruddha, holding a sword and a shield. The fact that they stand around Narasimha suggests a fusion of the Satvata cult with the Vrishni cult.

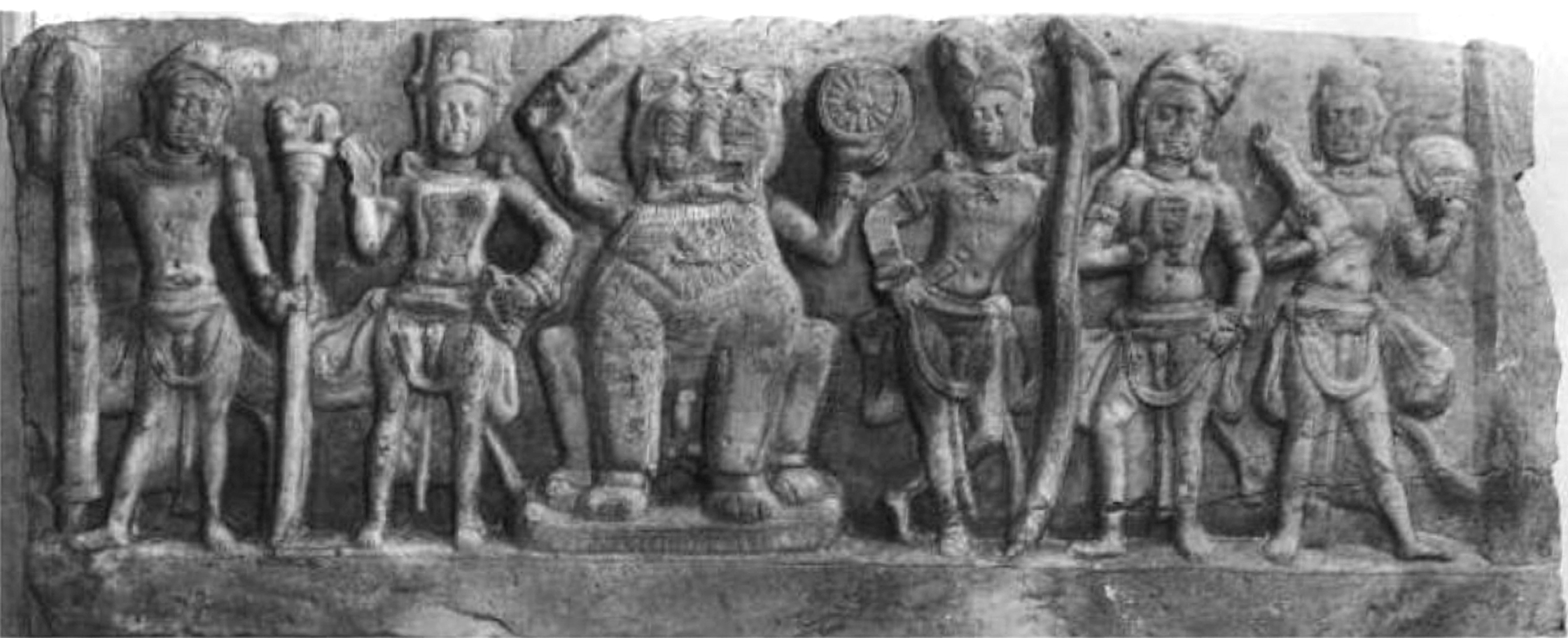
Kondamotu Vrishni heroes relief, 4th century CE, Hyderabad State Museum. Saṃkarṣaṇa is first to the left.

== Lion symbol ==
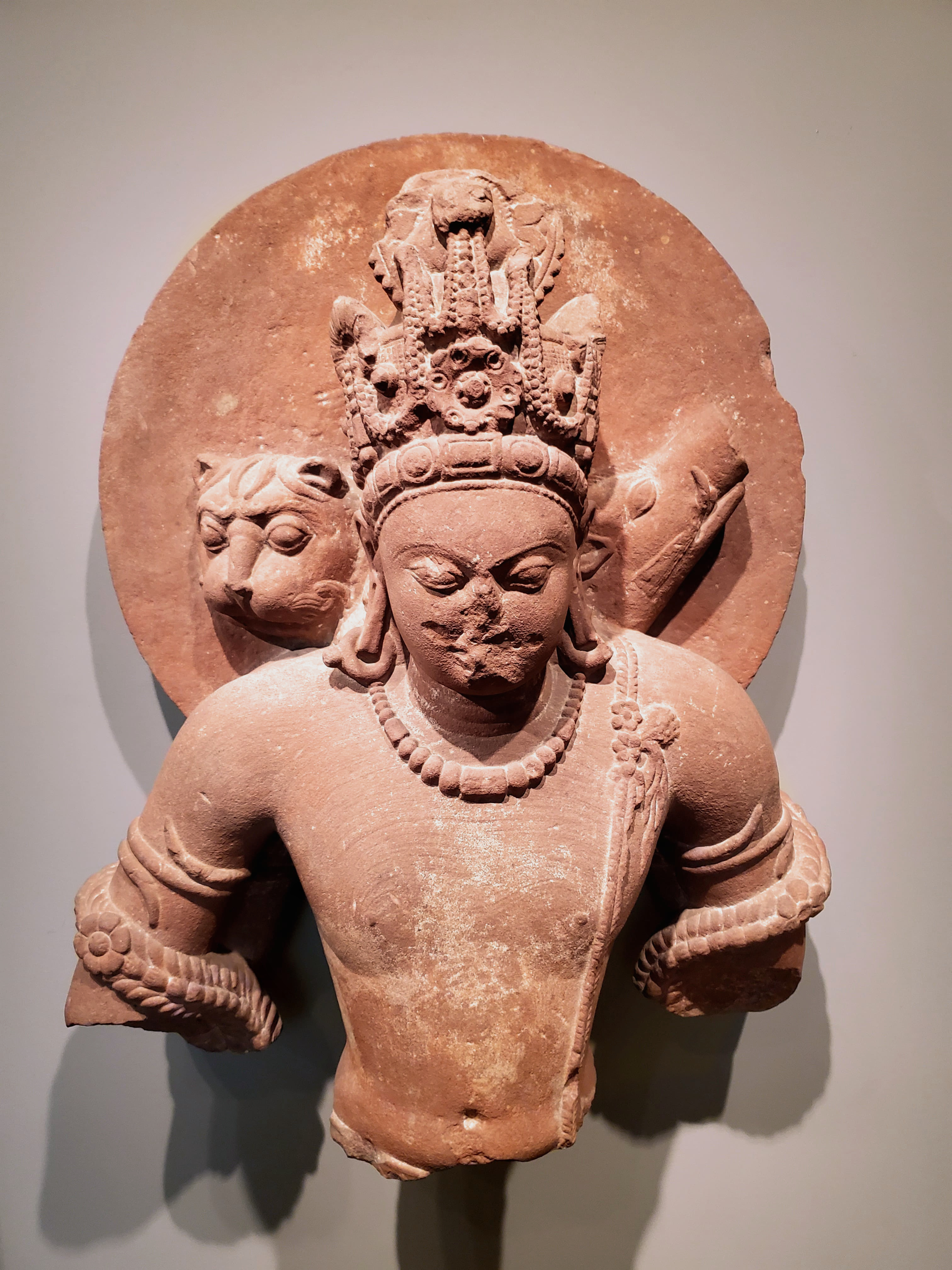
Saṃkarṣaṇa appears as a lion, while Aniruddha appears as a boar in this Vaikuntha Chaturmurti statue, showing Vishnu with his three main emanations, mid-5th century. Boston Museum.

In Vaishnavism, Saṃkarṣaṇa is associated with the lion, which is his theriomorphic aspect. He can be identified as Narasimha. Saṃkarṣaṇa appears as a lion in some of the Caturvyūha statues (the Bhita statue), where he is an assistant to Vāsudeva, and in the Vaikuntha Chaturmurti when his lion's head protrudes from the side of Vishnu's head.

Saṃkarṣaṇa is also associated with the quality of knowledge.

== See also ==
- Bhagavad Gita
- Bhagavata Purana

Pāñcarātra system
	Vyūhas	Image	Attributes	Symbol	Direction	Face	Concept
Narayana; Vishnu	Vāsudeva		Chakra Wheel; Gadā Mace; Shankha Conch	Garuda Eagle	East	Saumya (Placid/ benevolent)	Jṅāna Knowledge
Narayana; Vishnu	Samkarsana		Lāṅgala Plough; Musala Pestle; Wine glass	Tala Fan palm	South	Simha Lion	Bala Strength
Narayana; Vishnu	Pradyumna		Cāpa Bow; Bāṇa Arrow	Makara Crocodile	West	Raudra Kapila	Aiśvaryā Sovereignty
Narayana; Vishnu	Aniruddha		Carma Shield; Khaḍga Sword	Ṛṣya (ऋष्य) White-footed antelope	North	Varaha Boar	Śakti Power
