= Vyūha =

To arrange troops in a battle formation

Vyūha (Sanskrit: व्यूह) is a Sanskrit word that translates to 'military array', 'formation' or 'multitude'. Vyuham in classical Indian military science, is the strategic positioning and deploying of an army in such a way that the opponent's force is blunted / thwarted and increases the threat to the opponent. Padmavyuham was the legendary 'positioning' of the kaurava army against the pandava might to trap abhimanyu.

While the term originates in a military context to describe battle formations, it is also used in Indian philosophy, most prominently in the Pancharatra tradition, to refer to the strategic manifestation of Narayana or Vishnu into multiple functional forms. This theological application is a direct extension of the military vyūha through a metaphor: just as a single army remains one entity while being rearranged into specific "formations" to achieve a particular objective, the Supreme Being remains singular while rearranging into a multitude of emanations to perform different divine functions. In Vaishnava theology, this is expressed through the Caturvyūha, where God emanates into four distinct forms to support the cyclical creation, sustenance, and destruction processes of the universe.

== Military use ==
Vyuha is strategic placement of available resources of an army at war. It is a formation and derives its name and ways to act and perform according to many things found in nature and in daily use.

In case of the Padma-vyuham, the army formation is in the form of a lotus with strategic placement of the cavalry, footsoldiers, swordsmen, charioteers, elephants, etc., in an attempt to deliver maximum damage to the opposing force as well as protecting the principal participants from the enemy. The lotus formation facilitated and worked on the pattern of opening of petals thereby surrounding more of the enemies and then closing of the petals thereby trapping them and rendering them ineffective.

There are a number of such formations and operate on the basis of the objects/animals they derive their names from, like

- suchika-mukha-vyuham (shaped like a needle tip)
- makar-vyuham (shaped like a crocodile)
- garuda-yuham (shaped like a hawk)
- baana-vyuham(shaped like an arrow)
- ghata-vyuham(shaped like a pot)

The padma-vyuham is sometimes considered to be laid to trap abhimanyu, which is not correct, actually abhimanyu was trapped in the chakra-vyuham (formation like a turning wheel), wherein the army in consequent concentric circles moved in the opposite direction thereby trapping and confusing the enemy, and protecting its core which was the only vulnerable point of the entire formation. The core once pierced would throw the entire vyuham in a disarray.

== Vyūha in Hinduism ==
=== Vyūha in the Mahabharata ===
==== Theological doctrine ====
The earliest concept of the vyūha doctrine, pre-dating the Pāñcarātra texts, is found in a section of the Shanti Parva of the Mahabharata, known as the Narayania.

==== Battle formations ====
The Mahabharata and the Manu Samhita list by name and formation many vyūhas ('battle formations'), which could range greatly in size.

Day No	Vyūha of Pandava	Vyūha of Kaurava
Day 1	Vajra (Thunderbolt).	Sarvato Mukhi (All Sided)
Day 2	Krauncha/Krauncharuna(Cranes)	Garuda
Day 3	Ardha Chandra (Half Moon)	Garuda
Day 4	Sringataka (Horn)	Mandala
Day 5	Syena vyūha (Hawk)	Makara
Day 6	Makara	Krauncha
Day 7	Vajra	Mandala
Day 8	Thrishoola	Kurma
Day 9	Nakshatra Mandala	Sarvatobhadra
Day 10	Surya	Asura
Day 11	Krauncha	Shakata
Day 12	Ardha Chandra	Garuada
Day 13	No Vyūha	Chakra
Day 14	Khaddag Sarp	Chakrashatak
Day 15	Vajra	Pathma
Day 16	Ardha Chandra	Makara
Day 17	Mahish	Soorya
Day 18	Krauncha	Sarvatobhadra

1. Ardha-chandra-vyūha ('crescent moon formation'),
2. Chakra-vyūha ('circular formation') a large formation was devised by the Kauravas in which Abhimanyu, son of Arjuna, was trapped never to emerge alive.
3. Garbha-vyūha ('womb-shaped formation'),
4. Makara-vyuha ('crocodile formation'), adopted by Bhishma in the Kurukshetra War
5. Mandala vyuha ('galaxy formation'),
6. Oormi vyuha ('ocean formation'),
7. Shakata-vyūha ('cart-shaped formation'),
8. Sarvatobhadra-vyūha ('grand formation'),
9. Suchi-vyūha ('needle-shaped formation'),
10. Shyena-vyuha (also called Garuda Vyuh) ('eagle formation'). At the commencement of the Kurukshetra War which lasted for eighteen days, the Pandavas, being aware that Bhishma stood protected by the "makara vyuha" and was ready for battle, they had adopted the invincible "sheyna vyuha" with Bhima leading stationed at the mouth and Arjuna stationed at the neck of the bird-shaped vyuha, and Yudhishthira patrolling the rear.
11. Vajra-vyūha was large a three-fold formation of warriors.

=== Vyūha in the Pāñcarātra Āgama: the Vaiṣṇava doctrine of manifestation ===
Caturvyūha
The "Four emanations"

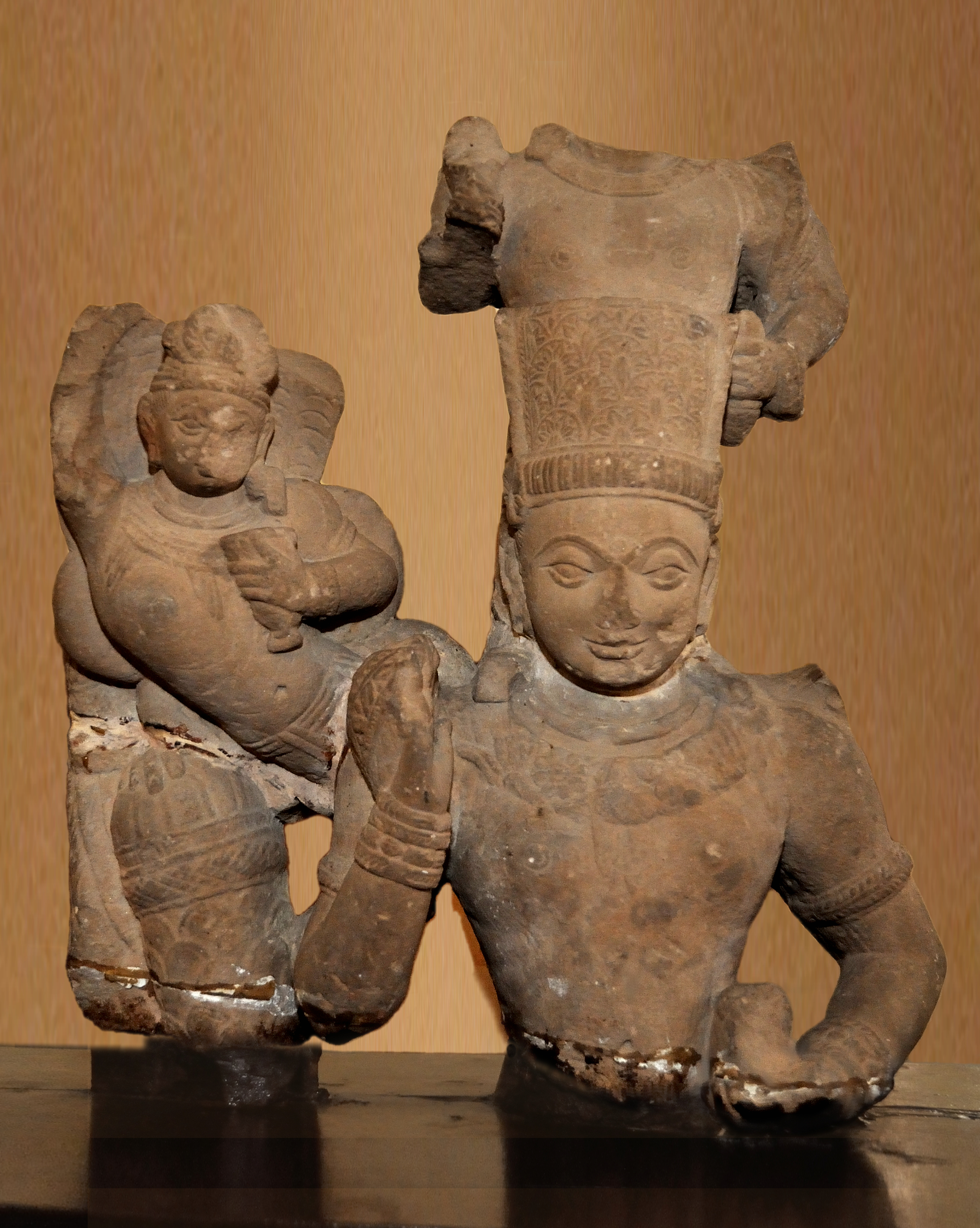
Front: Vāsudeva and his kinsmen emanating from him.

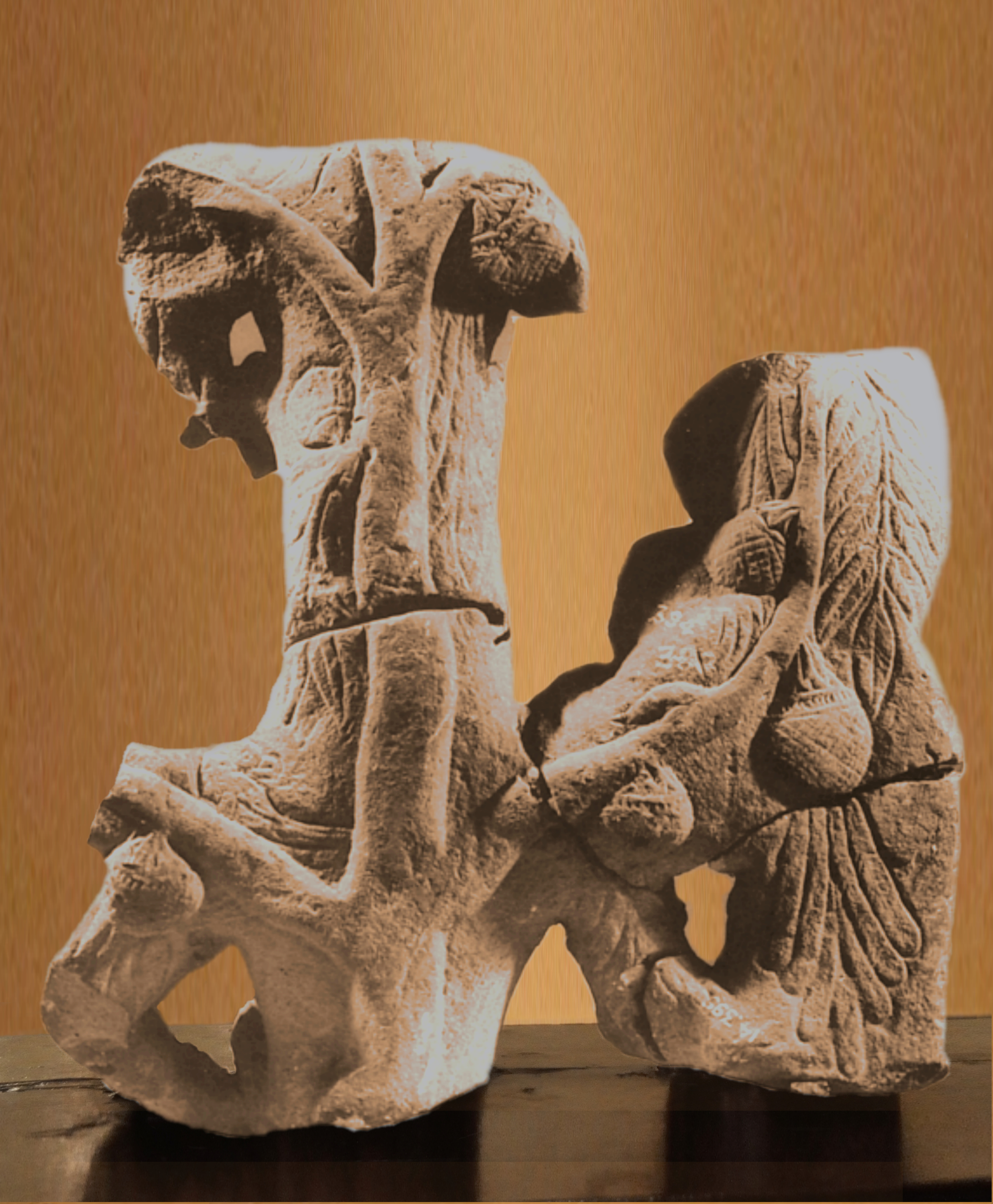
Back: Kadamba tree and branches showing their relationship.

The Caturvyūha, showing the four emanation of Nārāyaṇa, or later Vishnu. Vāsudeva is four-armed, and is fittingly in the center with his decorated heavy mace on the side and holding a conch, his elder brother Balarama to his right under a serpent hood, his son Pradyumna to his left (lost), and his grandson Aniruddha on top. The back of the statue shows the trunk of a tree with branches, thus highlighting the genealogical relationship between the divinities. 2nd century CE, Art of Mathura, Mathura Museum.

The main āgamas are the Vaiṣṇava (worship of Vishnu), the Śaiva (worship of Shiva) and the Śākta (worship of Devi or Shakti) āgamas; all āgamas are elaborate systems of Vedic knowledge. According to Vedanta Desika, the Pāñcarātra āgama teaches the five-fold daily religious duty consisting of – abhigamana, upādāna, ijyā, svādhyāya and yoga, the name of this āgama is derived on account of its description of the five-fold manifestation of the Supreme Being viz, para (supreme or the transcendental form), vyūha (formation or manifestation as the four vyūha), vibhava (reincarnation or descent to earth as avtāra), arcā (visible image of God) and antaryāmi (cosmic form of God). Lakshmi accompanies Vishnu in His Chatur-vyūha (four-fold manifestation) as Vāsudeva (creator), Saṅkarṣaṇa (sustainer), Pradyumna (destroyer), and Aniruddha (spiritual knowledge promulgator). This is the Vaiṣṇava doctrine of Vyūha or the doctrine of formation.

The Chatur-vyūha forms of Viṣṇu are related to four of the six causes of creation which six are God Himself as the final cause of creation and His five aspects – Narāyaṇa (thinking), Vāsudeva (feeling), Sankarśana (willing), Pradyumna (knowing), and Aniruddha (acting) successively. Each divinity controls its specific creative energy. The six gunas – jnana (omniscience), aishvarya (lordship), shakti (potency), bala (force), virya (virtue) and tejas (self-sufficiency), acting in pairs and in totality, are the instruments and the subtle material of pure creation. Vyūhas are the first beings created, and they represent the effective parts of a coherent whole. Here, vyūha means – projection; the projection of the svarūpa ('own form') as bahurūpa ('manifest variously').

== Vyūha in Buddhism ==
In Mahāyāna Buddhism, the word vyūha means "arrangement", the like of marvelous, supernatural, magical arrangements, or supernatural manifestations. It is also extant in the Pali language, where it means "an array" or "grouping of troops".

The term is also found among the titles of some Buddhist texts. In Pure Land Buddhism, the character of Amitābha Buddha is elaborated upon in both the Longer Sukhāvatīvyūha Sūtra and the Shorter Sukhāvatīvyūha Sūtra. The term "Sukhāvatīvyūha" may translated as "description of Sukhāvatī". The Kāraṇḍavyūha Sūtra has been translated as "The Basket's Display".

== See also ==
- Hindu texts
- Indian martial arts

Pāñcarātra system
	Vyūhas	Image	Attributes	Symbol	Direction	Face	Concept
Narayana; Vishnu	Vāsudeva		Chakra Wheel; Gadā Mace; Shankha Conch	Garuda Eagle	East	Saumya (Placid/ benevolent)	Jṅāna Knowledge
Narayana; Vishnu	Samkarsana		Lāṅgala Plough; Musala Pestle; Wine glass	Tala Fan palm	South	Simha Lion	Bala Strength
Narayana; Vishnu	Pradyumna		Cāpa Bow; Bāṇa Arrow	Makara Crocodile	West	Raudra Kapila	Aiśvaryā Sovereignty
Narayana; Vishnu	Aniruddha		Carma Shield; Khaḍga Sword	Ṛṣya (ऋष्य) White-footed antelope	North	Varaha Boar	Śakti Power
