= Daridra Narayana =

Axiom by Swami Vivekananda

Daridra Narayana or Daridranarayana or Daridra Narayan is an axiom enunciated by the late-19th century Indian sage Swami Vivekananda, espousing that service to the poor is equivalent in importance and piety to service to God. This exposition was a result of Vivekananda's wanderings in the country for two years, when he personally experienced the privation of the lower classes in the country. Vivekananda then referred to feeding the poor as "Narayana Seva", and preached for "Daridra Narayana Seva", meaning service to the poor as service to Narayana. "Narayanam Devam adevam isam - Lord Narayana, the Supreme controller and the ultimate Soul of all existence, venerated as the Supreme Being in Vaishnavism.

Though the term was coined by Vivekananda, it was popularized by Mahatma Gandhi.

== Background ==
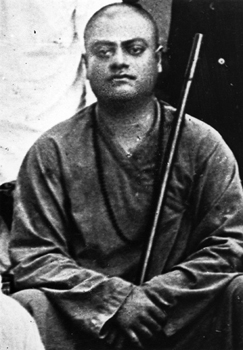
Swami Vivekananda in Chennai during his Parivrajaka Sanyasi wanderings, February 1897.

Vivekananda, after he became a sage in 1892, had a deep desire to spread the message of "divine unity of existence and unity in diversity" throughout British India.

He then as a Parivrajaka Sanyasi, a "wandering" or itinerant monk, travelled all over India from its north to west. He confronted the poverty and deprivation of his countrymen, and the degree of their ignorance and exploitation. He then said that "To the hungry religion comes in the form of bread". At the end of his Parivrajaka, he said "The only God that exists, the only God in whom we believe ...my God the miserable, my God the poor of all races". He believed that the only way to help the poor was through the spirit of Niskama karma of the Gita. His vow was to "serve humanity."

== Practice ==
=== In Swami Vivekananda's works ===
Once, during a meeting with Keshta, leader of the tribal community of Santals, Vivekananda was told by Keshta that he and his community would not eat food touched by others if salt was added to it, as he explained that such an action would render them outcasts. Then Vivekananda posed a question to Keshta, that if he served food without salt would they eat it in his presence. After getting an affirmative answer, according to Vivekananda's directive food was served without salt in the form of bread, curry, sweets and so forth, which the Santals partook in Vivekananda's presence. After eating the food Keshtta exclaimed "Whence have you got such a thing? We never tasted anything like this." Then Vivekananda explained that they were like god Narayana, and he had offered food to the manifestation of god. Thus, Vivekananda who coined the euphemism "Daridra Narayana" practiced it in front of the poor Santals whom he considered as manifestation of Narayana.

=== In Mahatma Gandhi's works ===
Though the term was coined by Swami Vivekananda, it was popularized by Mahatma Gandhi, Throughout his political career Gandhi worked for the betterment of poor and distressed people. He mainly preached about Satyagraha and Ahimsa but also pleaded for these poor people, the Daridra Naraynas. He learned about this term from Chittaranjan Das.

=== Others ===
This dictum of Daridra Narayan Seva was extended to the medical field to treat the poor when, in 1972, the Swami Vivekananda Medical Mission came to be established. The motto of this mission is what Vivekananda had said: "To reach Narayana we must serve the Daridra Narayana, the starving millions of the land. Feel for them, pray for them. Strive for the relief and uplift of the suffering and miserable brethren."

Extending the practice of this religious axiom, a new idiom has been coined "Where Daridra Narayan meets Vaidya Narayana" (Vaidya means medicine) by a leading doctor in Coimbatore, in South India who has urged "Whenever a 'daridra narayan' (poor person) knocks on the door, one must be ready to perform the duty of a 'vaidya narayan' (doctor) in the fullest capacity".

Satya Sai Baba, a saint, in his preaching to his devotees on 22 Jan 1985 explained that God is worshipped in two forms, as Lakshmi-Narayana and Daridra-Narayana. The commonly known practice of most people is to worship Lakshmi-Narayana seeking blessings for their personal prosperity and well-being. Only a handful of people chose to worship "Daridra-Narayana (the Lord in the form of the poor and the forlorn)". Baba urged his devotees to

think only of service to Daridra-Narayana. If the hungry are fed, they are easily satisfied. Service to Daridra-Narayana can never go waste. It is the highest form of sadhana. Man is the product of the society, and service to society is real service to God. Such service should be rendered without regard to caste, creed, race or nationality.

On another occasion in November 1886 Baba said "When a hungry Nara is served a hearty meal, what is being done is Narayana Seva, for, Nara (man) is only "a form and a name" projected by Maya (human ignorance) on Narayana (God)."

== Criticism ==
A.C. Bhaktivedanta Swami Srila Prabhupada, a stalwart Vaishnavite religious preacher, has criticized the propagation of the dictum of Daridra Narayana. He calls this axiom as a fashion as he believes that "Daridra cannot be Narayana, neither Narayana can be daridra, because Narayana is always accompanied by Sri, Laksmiji therefore how could he be daridra?

"A devotee sees everyone and everything in relationship with Nārāyaṇa (nārāyaṇa-mayam). Everything is an expansion of Nārāyaṇa’s energy. Just as those who are greedy see everything as a source of money-making and those who are lusty see everything as being conducive to sex, the most perfect devotee, Prahlāda Mahārāja, saw Nārāyaṇa even within a stone column. This does not mean, however, that we must accept the words daridra-nārāyaṇa, which have been manufactured by some unscrupulous person. One who actually envisions Nārāyaṇa everywhere makes no distinction between the poor and the rich. To single out the daridra-nārāyaṇa, or poor Nārāyaṇa, and reject the dhani-nārāyaṇa, or rich Nārāyaṇa, is not the vision of a devotee. Rather, that is the imperfect vision of materialistic persons." (Srila Prabhupada - Purport, Śrīmad-Bhāgavatam, 7.7.55)

"It is recommended that everyone distribute prasāda, considering every living being a part and parcel of the Supreme Lord. Even in feeding the poor, one should distribute prasāda. In Kali-yuga there is a scarcity of food almost every year, and thus philanthropists spend lavishly to feed the poor. For this they invent the term daridra-nārāyaṇa-sevā. This is prohibited. One should distribute sumptuous prasāda, considering everyone a part of the Supreme Lord, but one should not juggle words to make a poor man Nārāyaṇa. Everyone is related to the Supreme Lord, but one should not mistakenly think that because one is related to the Supreme Personality of Godhead, he has become the Supreme Personality of Godhead, Nārāyaṇa. Such a Māyāvāda philosophy is extremely dangerous." (Srila Prabhupada - Purport, Śrīmad-Bhāgavatam, 7.15.6)
