= Hathibada Ghosundi inscriptions =

1st-century BCE Sanskrit inscriptions

Hathibada Ghosundi Inscriptions
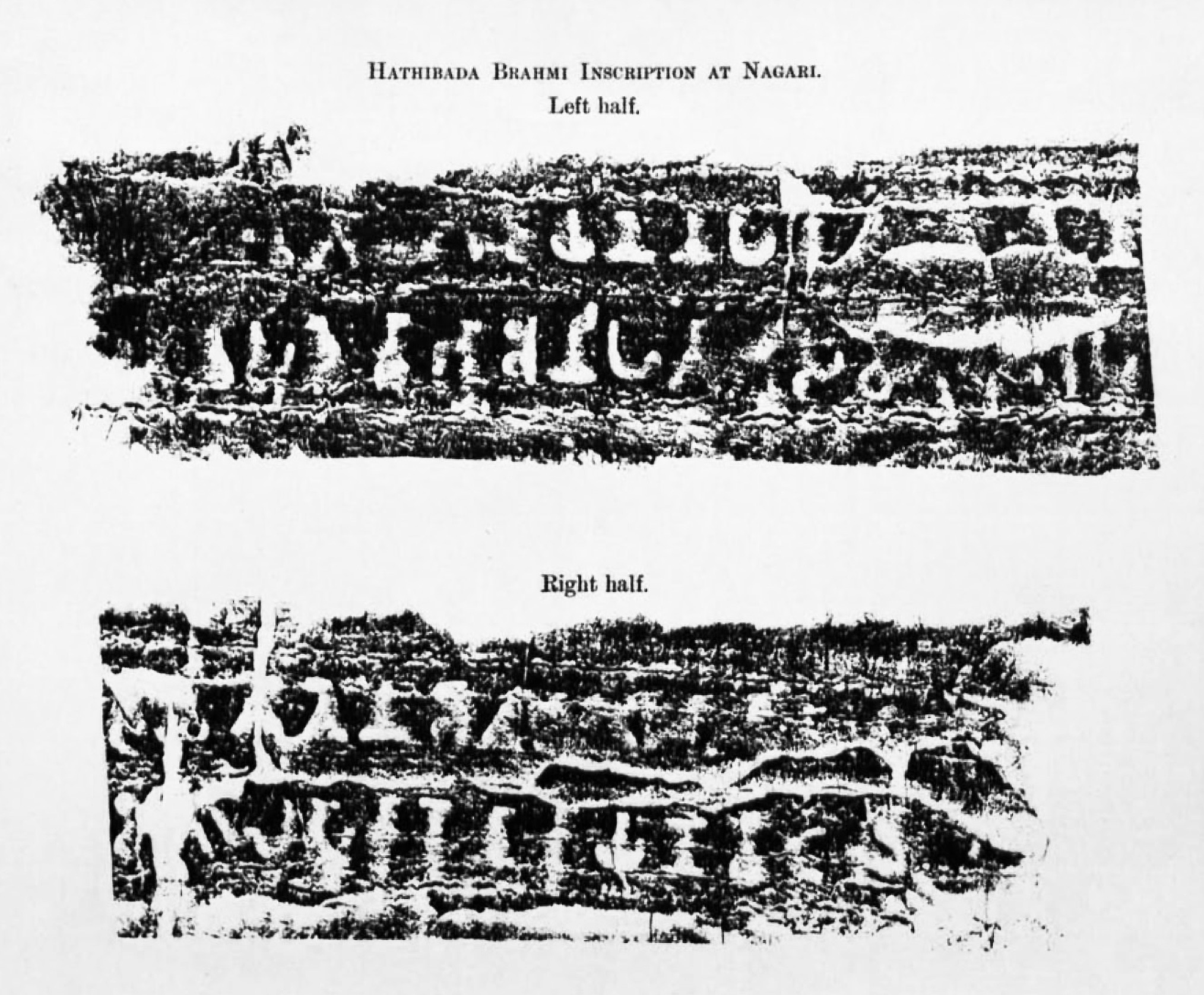
- Fragment C of the Hathibada Ghosundi Inscriptions, in Sanskrit. 2nd-1st century BCE.
- Material: Stone
- Writing: Sanskrit
- Created: 2nd-1st Century BCE
- Discovered: 24.967°N 74.683°E
- Place: Nagari (Chittorgarh), Rajasthan
- Present location: Government Museum, Udaipur

Location
- Nagari (India)

The Hathibada Ghosundi Inscriptions, sometimes referred simply as the Ghosundi Inscription or the Hathibada Inscription, are the oldest Sanskrit inscriptions in the Brahmi script, and dated to the 2nd-1st century BCE. The Hathibada inscription were found near Nagari village, about 8 miles (13 km) north of Chittorgarh, Rajasthan, India, while the Ghosundi inscription was found in the village of Ghosundi, about 3 miles (4.8 km) southwest of Chittorgarh.

== Description ==
Dated to the 2nd or 1st-century BCE, the Hathibada Ghosundi Inscriptions ("HGI") are among the oldest known Sanskrit inscriptions in Brahmi script from an early Vaishnavism tradition of ancient India.

The HGI were found as incomplete fragments in three different locations. One fragment was discovered inside an ancient water well in Ghosundi, another at the boundary wall between Ghosundi and Bassi, and the third on a stone slab in the inner wall of Hathibada. They may have been displaced during the Mughal emperor Akbar's siege of Chittorgarh. He camped at Nagari and built some facilities by breaking and reusing old structures, a legacy that gave the location its name "Hathi-bada" or "elephant stable". The fragment discovered in the Hathibada wall has the same style, Brahmi script and partly same text as the Ghosundi fragment, thereby suggesting a link. The three fragments are often studied together.

=== Religious significance ===
The HGI are significant not only for their antiquity but as a source of information about ancient Indian scripts, society, history and religious beliefs. The inscriptions seem to provide evidence for an early worship of Balarama and Krishna), the existence of a stone temple dedicated to them in 1st-century BCE, the puja tradition, and a king who had completed the Vedic Asvamedha sacrifice. The inscription seems to associate Samkarshana and Vāsudeva with Narayana (Vishnu), possibly a step in their later incorporation as avatars into the Vaishnavite pantheon.

Taken together with evidence such as the Besnagar inscription found on the Heliodorus pillar, the Hathibada Ghosundi Inscriptions suggest that devotional Bhagavatism was developing in ancient India between the 2nd and 1st century BCE. The HGI are not the oldest known inscriptions; others such as the Ayodhya Inscription and Nanaghat Cave Inscription are generally accepted as old or older.

== Inscriptions ==
The inscriptions are incomplete, though an attempt at restoration (see below) has been based on Sanskrit prosody rules. The fragments read:

Fragment A

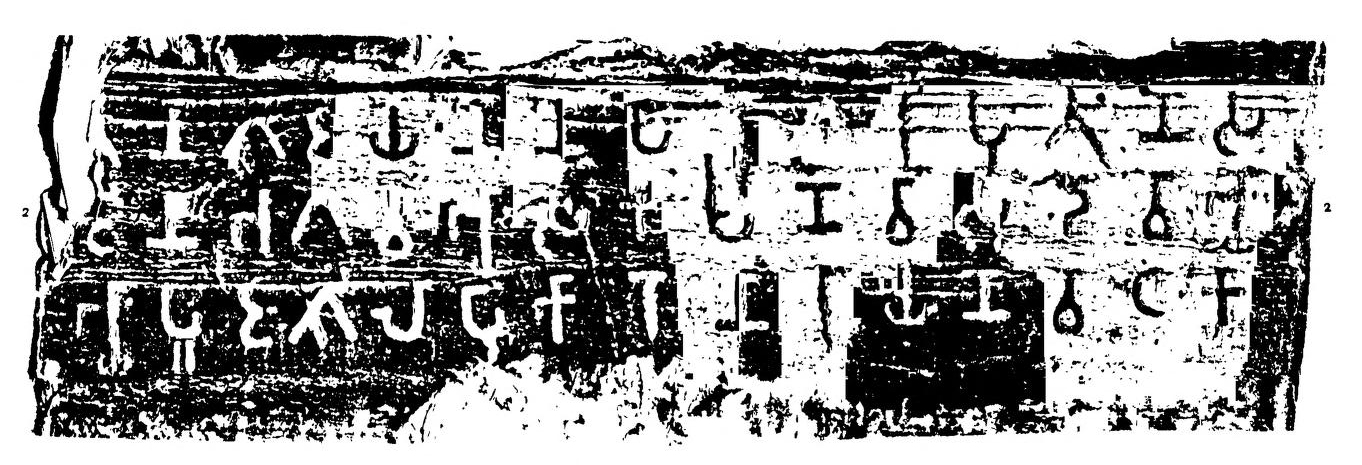
Fragment A (Ghosundi stone inscription).

1 .....𑀢𑀸𑀦 𑀕𑀚𑀬𑀦𑁂𑀦 𑀧𑀭𑀰𑀸𑀭𑀺𑀧𑀼𑀢𑁆𑀭𑁂𑀡 𑀲..
2.....𑀚𑀺𑀦𑀸 𑀪𑀕𑀯𑀪𑁆𑀬𑀁 𑀲𑀁𑀓𑀭𑁆𑀱𑀡 𑀯𑀸𑀲𑀼𑀤𑁂𑀯𑀸𑀪𑁆𑀬𑀁
3.....𑀪𑁆𑀬𑀁 𑀧𑀽𑀚𑀰𑀺𑀮𑀸 𑀧𑁆𑀭𑀓𑀸𑀭𑁄 𑀦𑀸𑀭𑀸𑀬𑀡 𑀯𑀸𑀝𑀺𑀓𑀸

1 ..... tēna Gājāyanēna P(ā)rāśarīputrēṇa Sa-
2 ..... [j]i[nā] bhagavabhyāṁ Saṁkarṣaṇa-V[ā]sudēvābhyā(ṁ)
3 ......bhyāṁ pūjāśilā-prākārō Nārāyaṇa-vāṭ(i)kā.

Fragment B

1 .....𑀢𑁆𑀭𑁂𑀡 𑀲𑀭𑁆𑀯𑀢𑀸𑀢𑁂𑀦 𑀅𑀰𑁆𑀯𑀫𑁂𑀥𑀸...
2.... 𑀲𑀭𑁆𑀯𑁂𑀲𑁆𑀯𑀸𑀭𑀪𑁆𑀬𑀁

1. ....[tr](ē)(ṇa) Sarvatātēna Aś[v]amēdha....
2 .....sarvēśvarābh(yāṁ).

Fragment C

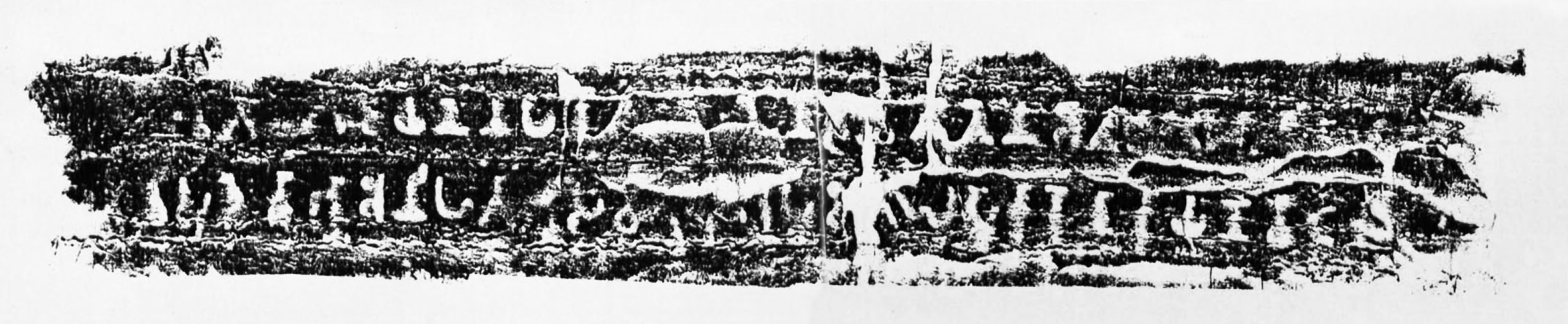
Fragment C (Hathibada stone inscription)

1....𑀯𑀸𑀢𑀸𑀦 𑀕𑀚𑀬𑀦𑁂𑀦 𑀧𑀭𑀰𑀸𑀭𑀺𑀧𑀼𑀢𑁆𑀭𑁂𑀡 𑀲𑀭𑁆𑀯𑀢𑀸𑀢𑁂𑀦 𑀅𑀰𑁆𑀯𑀫𑁂𑀥𑀸 𑀬𑀚𑀺𑀦
2....𑀡 𑀯𑀸𑀲𑀼𑀤𑁂𑀯𑀸𑀪𑁆𑀬𑀁 𑀅𑀦𑀺𑀳𑀸𑀢𑁂𑀪𑁆𑀬𑀁 𑀲𑀭𑁆𑀯𑁂𑀲𑁆𑀯𑀸𑀭𑀪𑁆𑀬𑀁 𑀧𑀽𑀚𑀰𑀺𑀮𑀸 𑀧𑁆𑀭𑀓𑀸𑀭𑁄 𑀦𑀸𑀭𑀸𑀬𑀡 𑀯𑀸𑀝𑀺𑀓𑀸

1 ....vat(ēna) [Gā]j(ā)yan[ē]na P(ā)r(āśarīpu)t(rē)ṇa [Sa](r)[vatā]tēna Aś(vamē)[dha](yā)- [j](inā)
2 ....(ṇa)-V(ā)sudēvābh[y]ā(ṁ) anihatā(bhyāṁ) sa(r)v(ē)[ś]va[r](ā)bh(yāṁ) p(ū)[j](ā)- [ś](i)l(ā)-p[r]ā[k]ārō Nār[ā]yaṇa-vāṭ(i)[k](ā).

Restoration

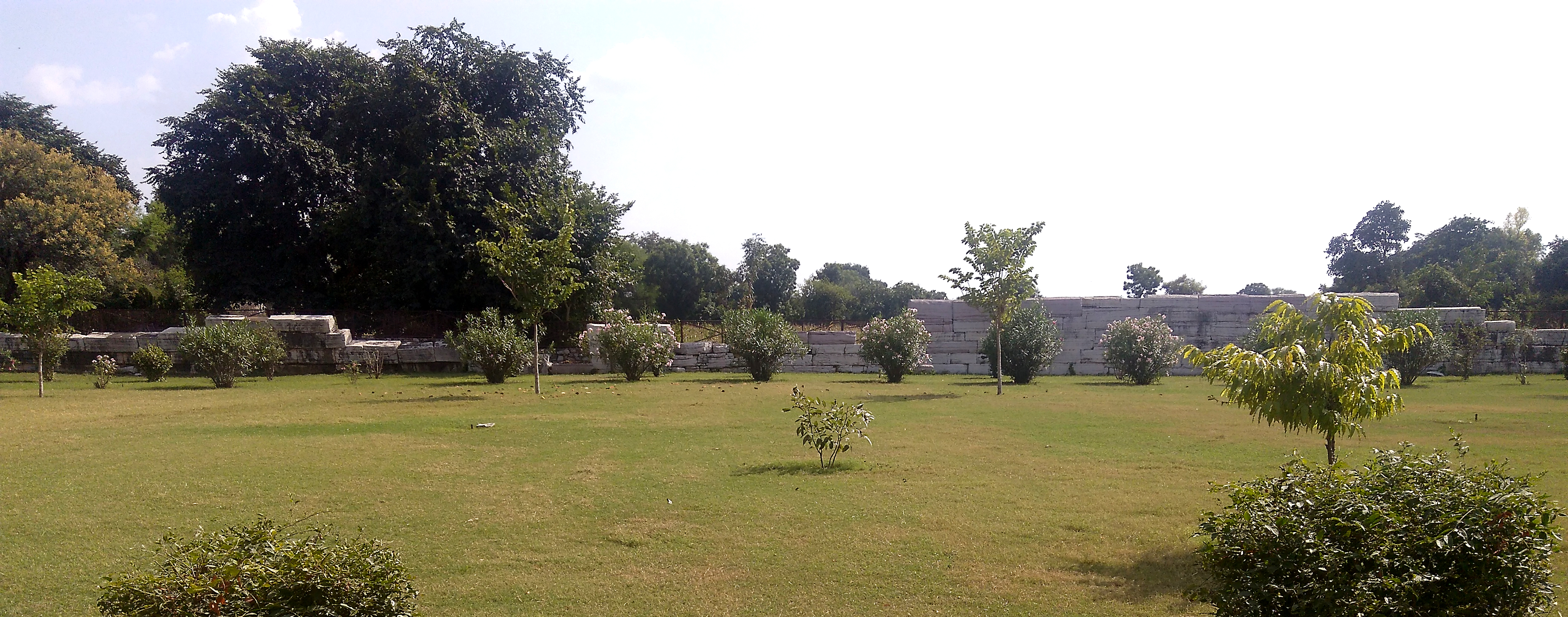
The Hathibada/Hathiwada enclosure in which was found one of the inscriptions.

Bhandarkar proposed that the three fragments suggest what the complete reading of fragment A might have been. His proposal was:

Fragment A (extrapolated)
1. (Karito=yam rajna Bhagava)tena Gajayanena Parasariputrena Sa-
2. (rvatatena Asvamedha-ya)jina bhagava[d*]bhyaih Samkarshana-Vasudevabhyam
3. (anihatabhyarh sarvesvara)bhyam pujasila-prakaro Narayana-vatika.

– D. R. Bhandarkar

=== Translations ===
Bhandarkar – an archaeologist, translates Fragment A as,

(This) enclosing wall round the stone (object) of worship, called Narayana-vatika (Compound) for the divinities Samkarshana-Vāsudeva who are unconquered and are lords of all (has been caused to be made) by (the king) Sarvatata, a Gajayana and son of (a lady) of the Parasaragotra, who is a devotee of Bhagavat (Vishnu or Samkarshana/Vāsudeva) and has performed an Asvamedha sacrifice.

– Hathibada Ghosundi Inscriptions, 1st-century BCE

Harry Falk – an Indologist, states that the king does not mention his father by name, only his mother, and in his dedicatory verse does not call himself raja (king). The king belonged to a Brahmin dynasty of Kanvas, that followed the Sungas dynasty. He translates one of the fragments as:

adherent of the Lord (bhagavat), belonging to the gotra of the Gajayanas, son of a mother from the Parasara gotra, performer of an Asvamedha.

Benjamín Preciado-Solís – an Indologist, translates it as:

[This] stone enclosure, called the Narayana Vatika, for the worship of Bhagavan Samkarsana and Bhagavan Vāsudeva, the invincible lords of all, [was erected] by [the Bhaga]vata king of the line of Gaja, Sarvatata, the victorious, who has performed an asvamedha, son of a Parasari.

== Sarvatata ==
Sarvatata

King of Madhyamika
- Reign: 3rd century BC
Regnal name
- 𑀲𑀭𑁆𑀯𑀢𑀸𑀢𑁂𑀦
- Religion: Hinduism

Within the inscriptions, a local king of Madhyamika (modern day Nagari, Rajasthan) named Sarvatata is mentioned. According to inscriptions, he performed the Ashvamedha yajna and also constructed a Narayana-vatika (vatika may mean "garden") compound dedicated to Saṃkarṣaṇa and Vāsudeva. The inscription also names Gajayana as Sarvatata's gotra or dynasty name, though this also is unclear. The same inscription names his mother's gotra as Parasari or Parāśara.
