= Vishnu nicolo seal =

4th-century agate seal

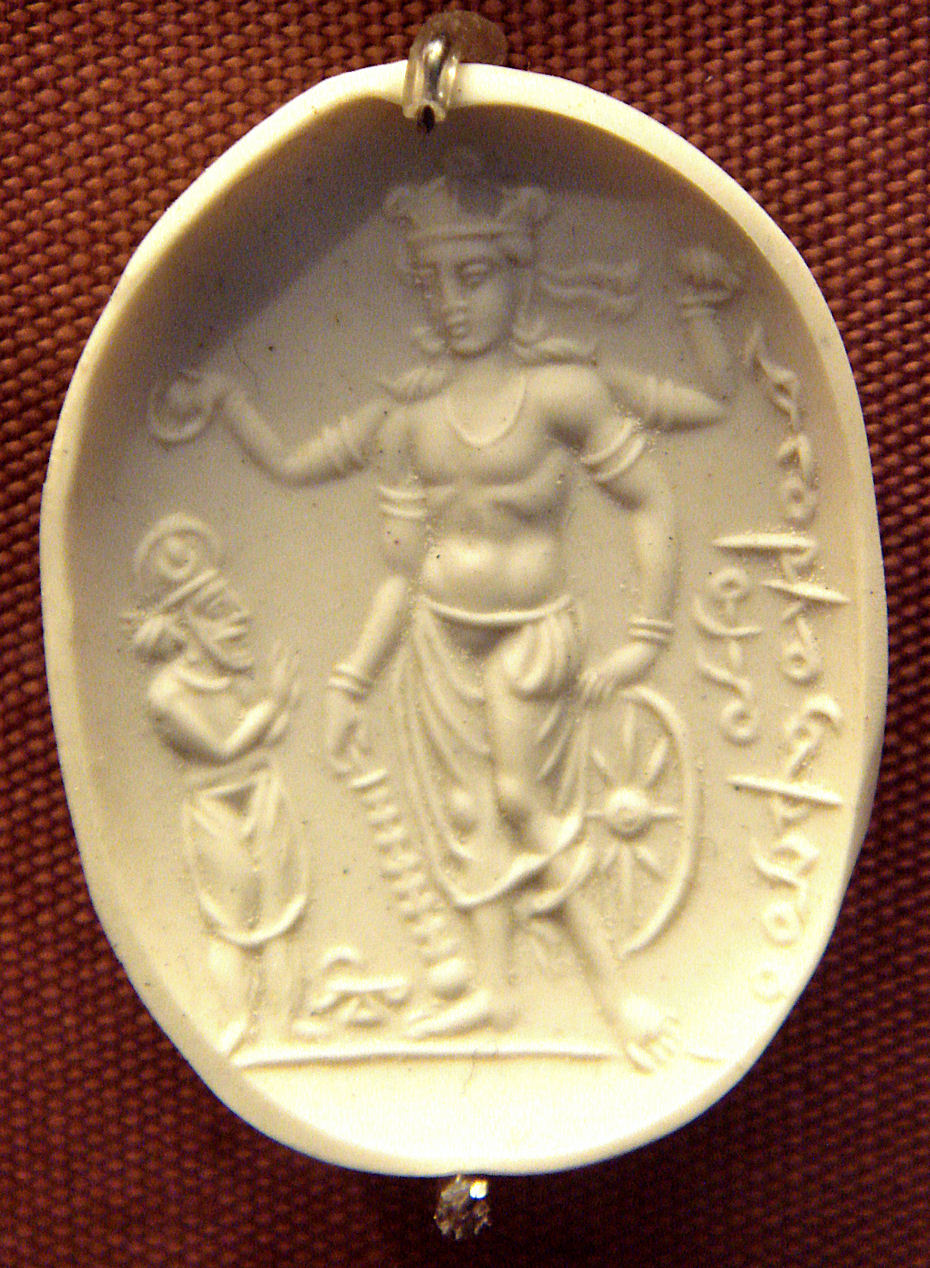
- Cast of the seal in the British Museum.
- Material: Agate (nicolo)
- Created: 4th century CE
- Discovered: Khyber Pakhtunkhwa, Pakistan; 34°N 71.32°E
- Present location: British Museum, London
- Registration: 1892,1103.98

Location
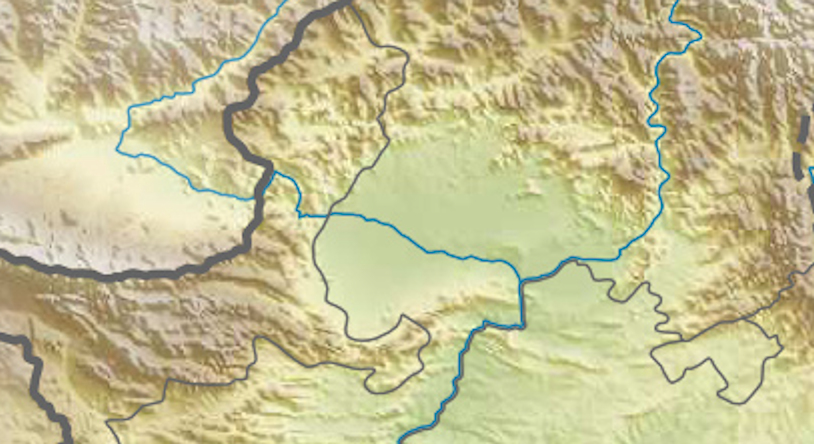

The Vishnu nicolo seal is a "finely engraved" oval agate seal (1.4 inches by 1.05 inch) from the Gandhara region, dated to the 4th century CE. Since 1892 it has been in the British Museum. Nicolo is an abbreviation of the Italian onicolo, meaning "little onyx", a type of stone with differently coloured layers into which the intaglio artist cuts to obtain an image in blue on black background.

The seal depicts a four-armed deity, probably Vishnu or Vāsudeva, being prayed by a royal devotee. The deity holds Vishnu's classical attributes: the gada club, the chakra discus, the wheel and the lotus. There is a two-line inscription and a monogram by the worshipper's feet.

The British Museum describes the inscription as "Bactrian", transliterating it: "(1) saso reo iastoo (2) algo", translated as: "Sas-re(w) the leader of worship (?)".

It was found in what was then the North-West Frontier Province of British India, now Khyber Pakhtunkhwa of Pakistan.

== Interpretations ==
The seal was first reported by Alexander Cunningham in The Numismatic Chronicle of 1893. Cunningham, saw in the devotee the Kushan emperor Huvishka, who reigned about 140-180 BC, based on the similarity of the headdress.

More recently Roman Ghirshman proposed that the text on the seal was in the Kushan script and mentions three major Hindu gods:

"Miarka Yasna Oezo" meaning:
"Mihira, Vishnu, Shiva"

— Text of the Nicolo seal.

A more recent interpretation suggests the divinity is Vāsudeva, an early deity whose attributes were later reused in the iconography of Vishnu with the addition of an aureole.

This recent research also identified the devotee, not with Huvishka, but with a Huna king. The devotee could also be a Kushano-Sasanian or a Kidarite prince.

The seal also suggest that a composite cult of the three deities Surya (another name for Mihira, meaning "Sun"), Vishnu and Shiva was current in India circa 500 CE. However, the British Museum in 2019 gives a different reading of the inscription.

Inscription of the Vishnu Nicolo Seal^{According to British Museum}
Line	Original (Greco-Bactrian script)	Transliteration	English translation
1	σασο ρηο ιαþτoo	saso reo iastoo	"Sas-re(w) the leader of worship (?)"
2	αλγo	algo	"Sas-re(w) the leader of worship (?)"

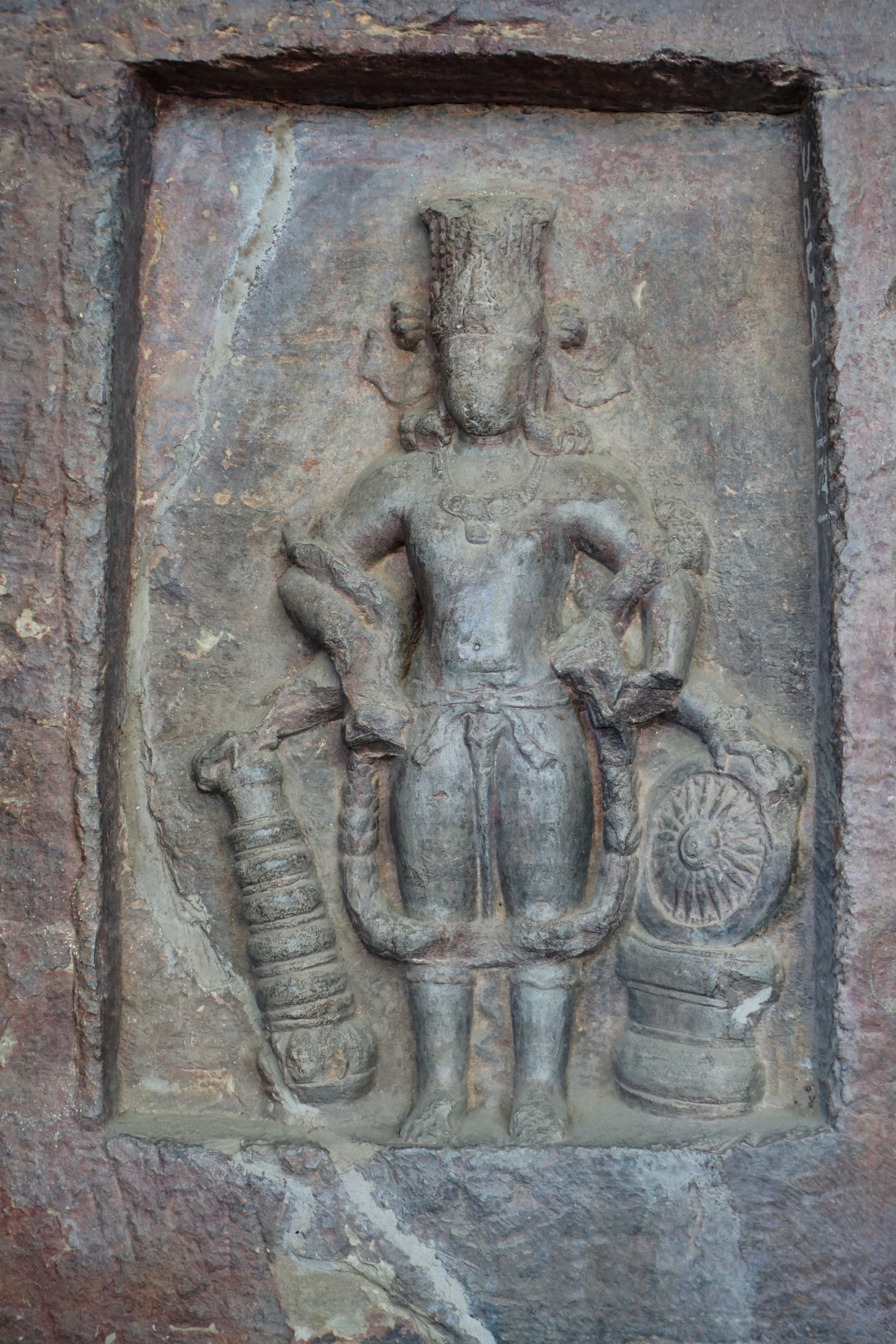
Vishnu, with similar attributes, Udayagiri Caves (c. 5th century).

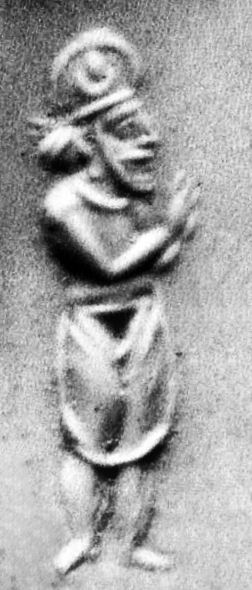
The devotee in the Vishnu Nicolo Seal (detail).

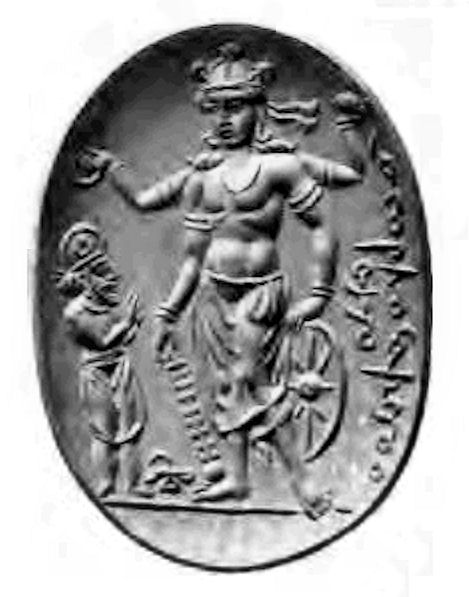
Vishnu Nicolo Seal, as first reported by Alexander Cunningham in 1893.
