= Purushottama =

Epithet of Hindu god Vishnu

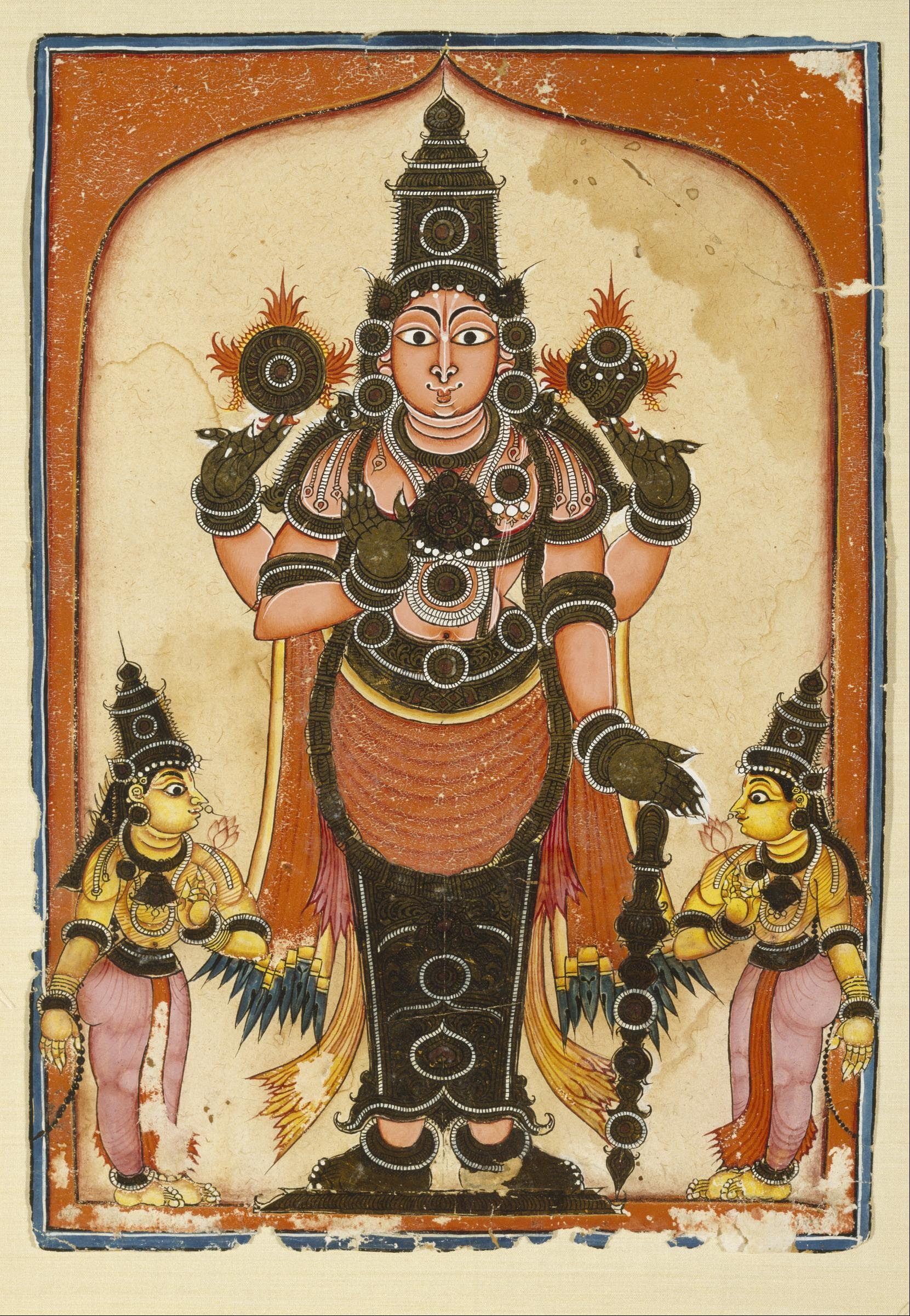
Vishnu accompanied by two aspects of Lakshmi, Sridevi and Bhudevi

Purushottama (Sanskrit: पुरुषोत्तम, from पुरुष, purusha, "person," "personal animating principle," or "soul," and उत्तम, uttama, "highest") is an epithet of the Hindu preserver deity, Vishnu. According to Vaishnavism, Vishnu is the source of moksha, the liberator of sins, the fount of knowledge, and the highest of all beings.

== Etymology ==
The epithet means the "Supreme Purusha", "Supreme Being," or "Supreme God".

It has alternatively also been put forth to mean: "One who is the Supreme Purusha, beyond the kshara (destructible — i.e., Prakṛti), and akshara (indestructible — i.e., Atman)".

== Literature ==
Purushottama is one of the names of Vishnu, and appears as the 24th name of the deity in the Vishnu Sahasranama of the Mahabharata. Rama as an avatara of Vishnu is called Maryada Purushottama, Krishna as an avatara of Vishnu is known as Leela Purushottama.

=== Bhagavad Gita ===
In Bhagavad Gita verse 10.15, Arjuna fully accepts Krishna's divine nature and acknowledges Him as source of all creation, including the gods.

The text invokes this epithet in its verses:

स्वयमेवात्मनात्मानं वेत्थ त्वं पुरुषोत्तम । भूतभावन भूतेश देवदेव जगत्पते ||१५||

swayam evātmanātmānaṁ vettha tvaṁ puruṣhottama | bhūta-bhāvana bhūteśha deva-deva jagat-pate ||15||

O Creator of beings, O Ruler of creatures, god of gods, the Lord of the universe, O supreme Purusa, You alone know what You are by Yourself.

— Bhagavad Gita, Verse 10.15

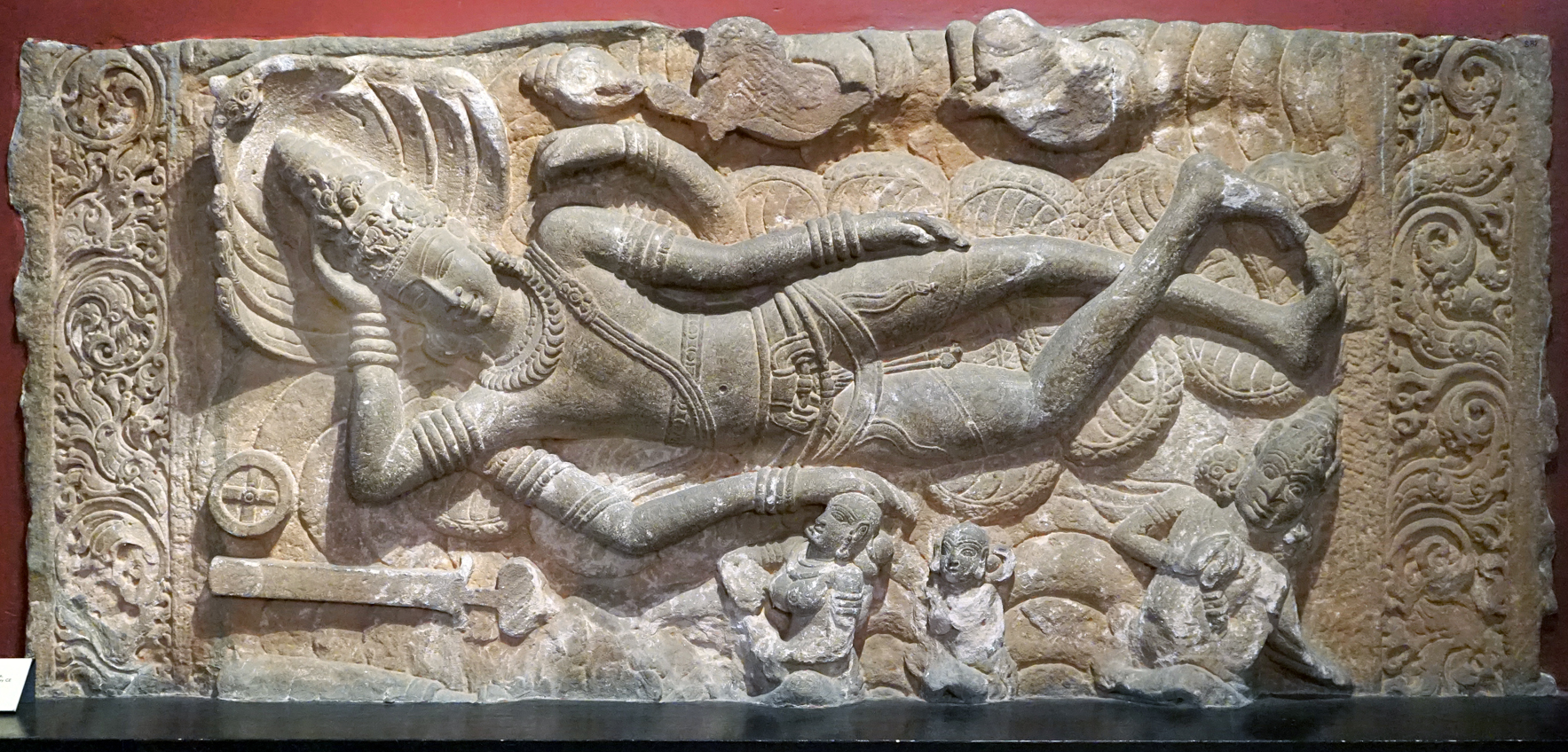
Sculpture of Vishnu, Mumbai

In verse 15.18, Krishna defines purushottama as a being superior to two purushas, kshara (perishable) and akshara (imperishable):

And because I am beyond the kshara and superior to the akshara as well, I am therefore celebrated in both general speech and in the Veda as "Purushottama".

— Bhagavad Gita, Verse 15.18

=== Harivamsha ===
In the Harivamsha, Brahma refers to Vishnu by this epithet before the events of the Samudra Manthana:

Brahma said:—O you highly powerful gods, I have learnt the object of your arrival here. O leading Suras, your object will be accomplished. That lord of the universe, who will vanquish Bali the foremost of Danavas, is not only the victor of the Daityas but is the conqueror of three worlds and is worshipful unto the gods. That eternal origin of the universe is the ordainer of the worlds. People call him omniscient and Hemagarbha. The great Lord, who will destroy the world and the Asura-chief Bali, is the origin of all and is our first born. That Yogin, that soul of the universe is above the reach of thought. Even the Devas do not know that great one: but that Purusottama knows the gods, ourselves and the whole universe. By His grace we fare well. And establishing communion with Him people practise hard austerities in this world.

— Harivamsha, Book 3, Chapter 43

=== Garuda Purana ===
The epithet is featured in the Vishnu Panjaram, a mantra to the deity:

Salutation unto thee, O Purusottama. Taking up thy plough-share Sunanda, protect me in the east, O Vishnu, I have taken refuge with thee. Taking up thy mace Shatana, O thou having lotus eyes, protect me in the north, O lord of the universe, I have taken refuge with thee.

— Garuda Purana, Chapter 13

Purushottama was explained by the philosopher Haridas Chaudhuri (1913–1975) as representing that ineffable phenomenon that lies even beyond the undifferentiated Godhead.

== See also ==
- Vishnu
- Swami Narayan
- Para Vasudeva
- Parameshvara
- Mahadevi

== Sources ==
- Sutton, Dr Nicholas (2017), Bhagavad Gita: The Oxford Centre for Hindu Studies Guide, CreateSpace Independent Publishing Platform, ISBN 978-1-5030-5291-8
