= Nagari, Rajasthan =

Nagari
- village
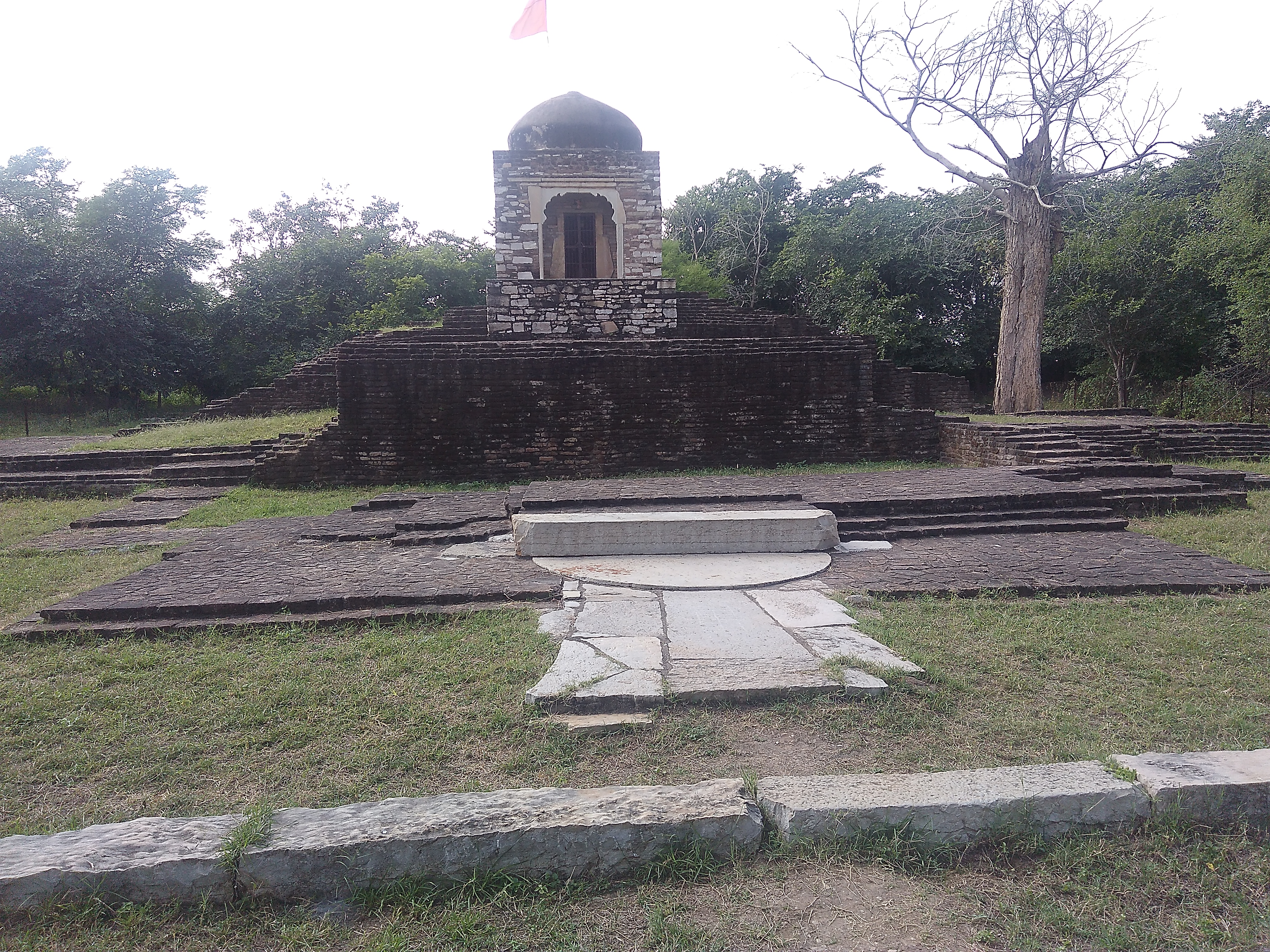
- Dewria balaji in Nagari

- Location in Rajasthan, India Nagari (Rajasthan)
- Coordinates: 24.9757°N 74.6825°E
- Country: India
- State: Rajasthan

Languages
  - Official: Hindi
- Time zone: UTC+5:30 (IST)
- ISO 3166 code: RJ-IN
- Vehicle registration: RJ-

Nagari, also Nagri, is a village situated 12 km north of Chittorgarh in Rajasthan state in India. Its ancient name was Madhyamika. It was a flourishing town from the Mauryan period up to Gupta period. The excavations here have shown some ancient archaeological structure with few believed to be religious in nature. The excavated Nagari temple too has been dated to the second half of the 1st-millennium BCE. A large number of punch marked and other old coins have been discovered here.

In the 2nd century BC Nagari was probably attacked by the Indo-Greeks who were ruling North-Western of India. As per Patanjali (150 BC) the great grammarian, Madhyamika was besieged by a Yavana king in 150 BC. Patanjali describes in the Mahābhāsya, the invasion in two examples using the imperfect tense of Sanskrit, denoting a recent event:

- "Arunad Yavanah Sāketam" ("The Yavanas (Greeks) were besieging Saketa")
- "Arunad Yavano Madhyamikām" ("The Yavanas were besieging Madhyamika" (the "Middle country").

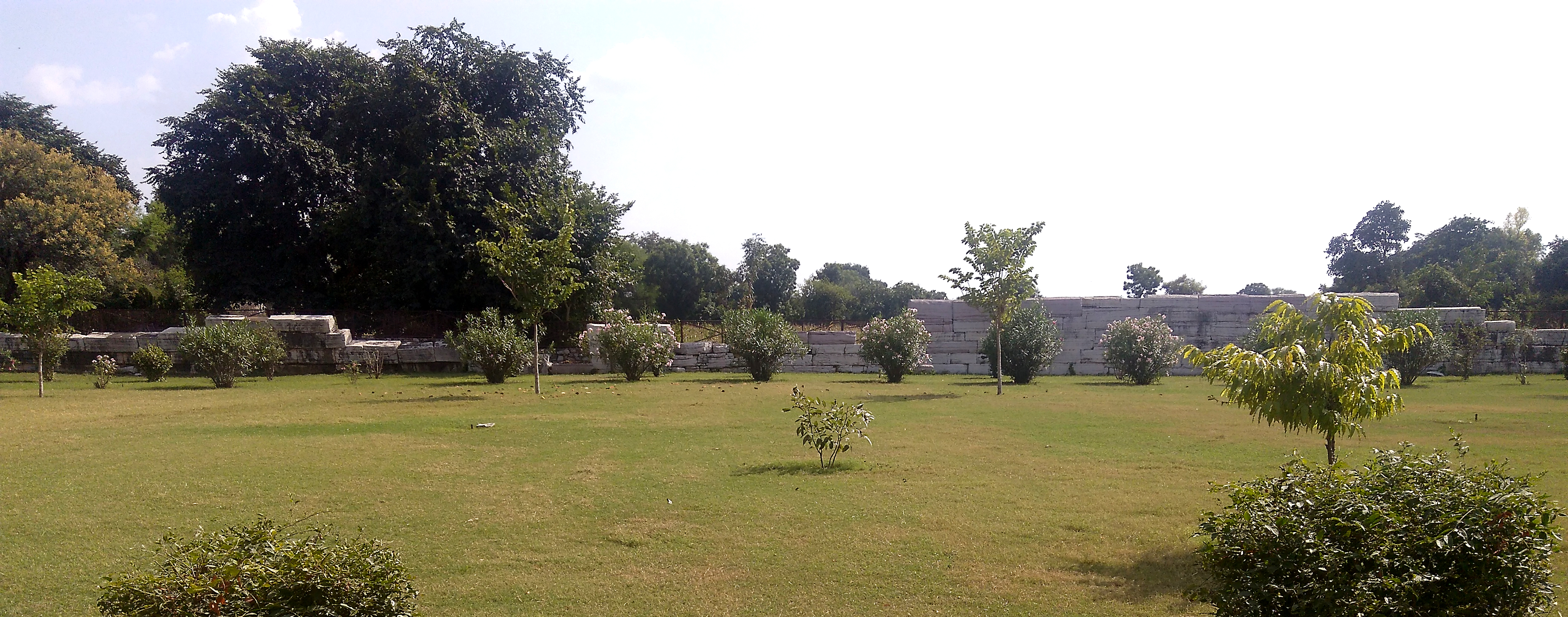
The Hathibada/Hathiwada enclosure in which was found one of the Hathibada Ghosundi Inscriptions.

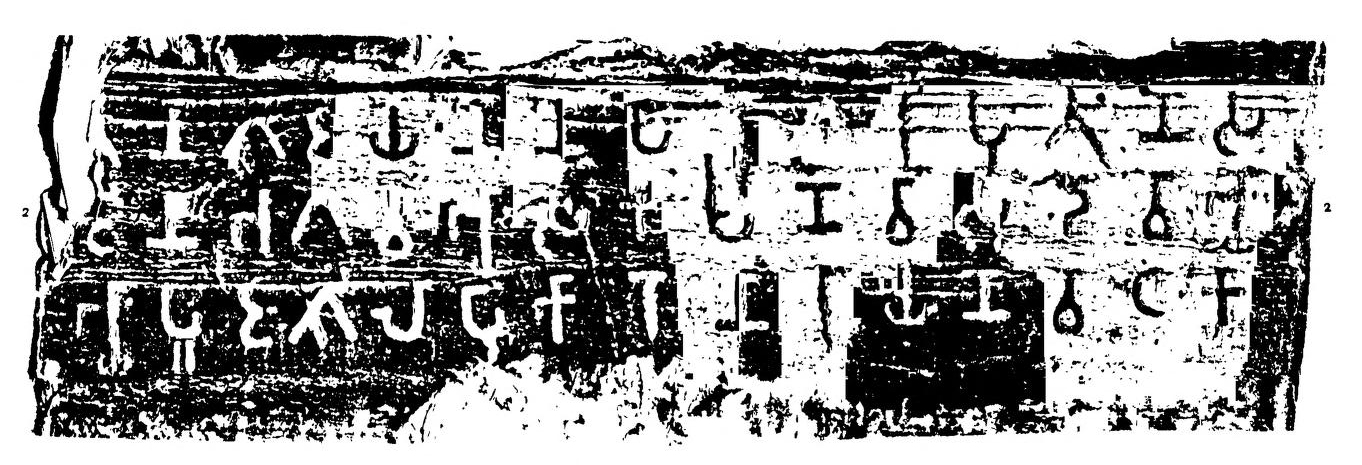
The 1st century BC Hathibada Ghosundi Inscriptions, some of the earliest inscriptions in Sanskrit, were found near Nagari.
