= Vāsudeva =

Vrishni hero

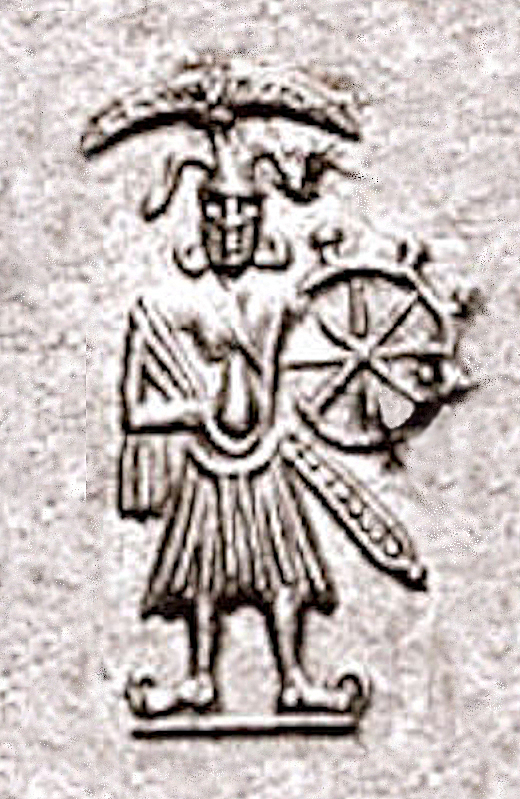
- Vāsudeva on a coin of Agathocles of Bactria, circa 190–180 BCE. This is "the earliest unambiguous image" of the deity.
- Weapon: Sudarshana Chakra; Kaumodaki

Genealogy
- Born: Mathura, Surasena (present-day Uttar Pradesh, India)
- Parents: Devaki (mother); Vasudeva Anakadundubhi (father)
- Siblings: Saṃkarṣaṇa (brother); Subhadra (sister)
- Consort: Rukmini
- Children: Pradyumna, Samba

Vāsudeva (/ˌvɑːsuˈdeɪvə/; Sanskrit: वासुदेव [ʋɑːsudéːʋɐ]), also known as Vāsudeva-Krishna (Vāsudeva-Kṛṣṇa) or Krishna-Vāsudeva, was a deified Vrishni hero of the Vrishni-clan, and may well have been a historical ruler in the region of Mathura. (Note: Rosenfield 1967, p. 151–152 and Fig.51: "Vāsudeva and Krishna "may well have been kings of this dynasty as well.") The movement of Vāsudeva was one of the major independent religious movements alongside those of Narayana, Shri and Lakshmi, which later coalesced to form Vaishnavism.

His religious following developed after the Vedic period, and was the first expression of what was to become Vaishnavism. (Note: Eliade & Adams 1987, p. 168: "...the theistic religious movement centered on bhakti for the deified Vṛṣṇi hero Vāsudeva, who is not mentioned in any early text. With the decline of Vedism, the movement emerged as a significant force. Strangely, the available evidence shows that the worship of Vāsudeva, and not that of Viṣṇu, marks the beginning of what we today understand by Vaiṣṇavism.") It was one of the earliest forms of personal deity worship in India, and is attested from around the 4th century BCE, when he was already considered as a deity, as he appears in Pāṇini's writings in conjunction with Arjuna as an object of worship. (Note: The affix vun comes in the sense of "this is his object of veneration" after the words 'Vâsudeva' and 'Arjuna'", giving Vâsudevaka and Arjunaka.) By the end of the 2nd century BCE, Vāsudeva was considered as Devadeva, the "God of Gods", the Supreme Deity, whose emblem was the mythical bird Garuda, as known from the Heliodorus pillar inscription.

After the movement of Vāsudeva had been established, the tribe of the Vrishnis fused with the tribe of the Yadavas, who had their own hero-god named Krishna. Vāsudeva was fused with Krishna, becoming Vāsudeva-Krishna (Vāsudeva-Kṛṣṇa), or Krishna-Vāsudeva. It is unknown at what point of time precisely Vāsudeva came to be associated with "Krishna," but the association between the names "Vāsudeva" and "Krishna" starts to appear with the Mahabharata and the Harivamsa, both completed in the 3rd century CE, where Krishna is called "Vāsudeva," a patronymic referring to his father Vasudeva Anakadundubhi.

The fused religious movement of Vāsudeva-Krishna became a major component of the amalgamated worship of Krishna, who was incorporated into Vaishnavism as the 8th incarnation of Vishnu. According to the Vaishnava doctrine of the avatars, Vishnu takes various forms to rescue the world, with Vāsudeva-Krishna understood as one of the most popular ones.

== Historical development ==
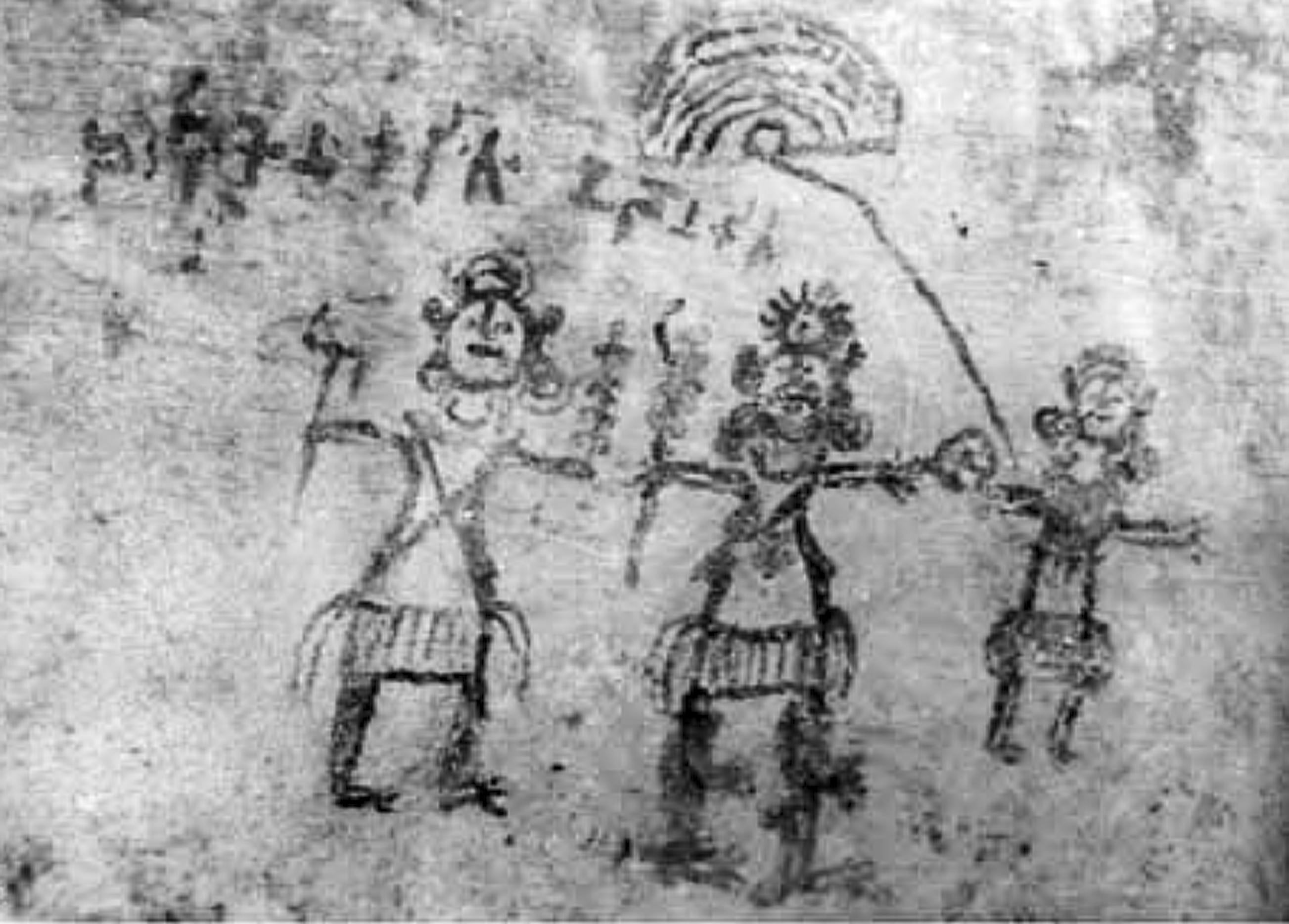
Samkarshana, Vāsudeva and the female Goddess Ekanamsha shown in a rock painting at Tikla, 3rd–2nd century BCE

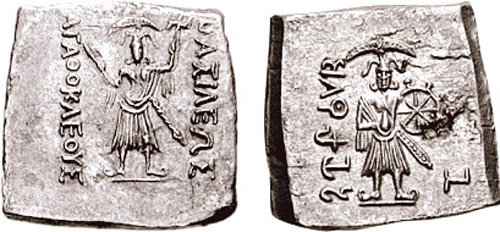
Coin of Agathocles of Bactria (190–180 BCE), with Samkarsana on the obverse and Vāsudeva on the reverse

The object of the Vāsudeva worship was initially the warrior hero Vāsudeva of the Vrishni clan. Vāsudeva eventually fused with Krishna and became known as Vāsudeva-krishna and incorporated into Vaishnavism. According to Srinivasan, the hero deity Vāsudeva may have evolved into a Vaishnavite deity through a step-by-step process:

1. deification of the Vrishni heroes, of whom Vāsudeva was the leader
2. association with the God Narayana-Vishnu
3. incorporation into the Vyuha concept of successive emanations of the God.

This process lasted from the 4th century BCE when Vāsudeva was an independent deity, to the 4th century CE, when Vishnu became much more prominent as the central deity of an integrated Vaishnava movement, with Vāsudeva-Krishna regarded as one of his manifestations.

Overall, "Vaishnavite Hinduism is believed to have originated in the 4th century BC in the cult of Vāsudeva-Krishna, which was then grafted in the 2nd century AD onto the cult of Narayana. By the 4th century, Vishnu's prominence increased considerably. He was now regarded as a member of the Trimurti, the cosmic triad of Gods, Brahma, Vishnu and Shiva".

=== Vāsudeva-cult ===
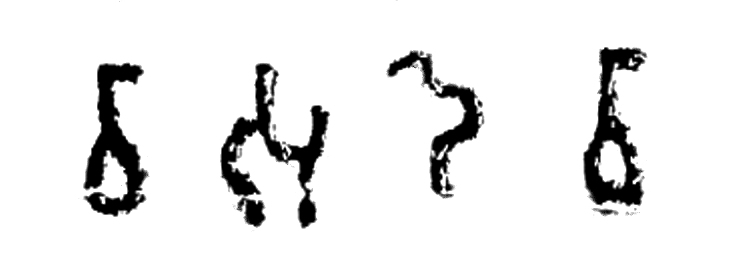
The name Vāsudevā (𑀯𑀸𑀲𑀼𑀤𑁂𑀯𑀸) in the Brahmi script, in the Ghosundi inscription, 1st century BCE

"Vāsudeva" is the first name of a deity to appear in the epigraphical record and in the earliest literary sources such as the writings of Pāṇini. The movement of Vāsudeva was one of the major independent religious movements alongside those of Narayana, Shri and Lakshmi, which later coalesced to form Vaishnavism.

The cult of Vāsudeva developed after the Vedic period, and was the first expression of what was to become Vaishnavism. The cult of Vāsudeva may have evolved from the worship of a historical figure belonging to the Vrishni clan in the region of Mathura. It was one of the earliest forms of personal deity worship in India, and is attested from around the 4th century BCE, when he was already considered as a deity, as he appears in Pāṇini's writings in conjunction with Arjuna as an object of worship, Pāṇini explaining that a vāsudevaka is a devotee (bhakta) of Vāsudeva. (Note: SINGH, R.R. (2007). Bhakti And Philosophy. Lexington Books. ISBN 978-0-7391-1424-7. :p. 10: "[Panini's] term Vāsudevaka, explained by the second century B.C commentator Patanjali, as referring to 'the follower of Vāsudeva, God of gods.'" The affix vun comes in the sense of "this is his object of veneration" after the words 'Vâsudeva' and 'Arjuna'", giving Vâsudevaka and Arjunaka. Source: Aṣṭādhyāyī 2.0 Panini 4-3-98) Some early scholars equate it with Bhagavatism.

By the end of the 2nd century BCE, Vāsudeva was considered as Devadeva, the "God of Gods", the Supreme Deity, whose emblem was the mythical bird Garuda, as known from the Heliodorus pillar inscription.

Vāsudeva was one of the five "Vrishni heroes." In literature, the Vrishni heroes and Vāsudeva are mentioned by Pāṇini in Astadhyayi verse 6.2.34 around the 4th century BCE, while Krishna is referred to as Krishna Varshneya in verse 3.187.51 of the Mahabharata. Epigraphically, the deified status of Vāsudeva is confirmed by his appearance on the coinage of Agathocles of Bactria (190–180 BCE) and by the devotional character of the Heliodorus pillar inscription.

The Buddhist Pali work Niddesa contains a list of religious sects, including the followers of the Vāsudeva and Baladeva.

=== Vāsudeva-Krishna ===
After the movement of Vāsudeva had been established, the tribe of the Vrishnis fused with the tribe of the Yadavas, who had their own hero-god named Krishna. Vāsudeva was fused with Krishna, becoming Vāsudeva-Krishna (Vāsudeva-Kṛṣṇa), or Krishna-Vāsudeva. It is unknown at what point of time precisely Vāsudeva came to be associated with "Krishna," but the association between the names "Vāsudeva" and "Krishna" starts to appear with the Mahabharata and the Harivamsa, both completed in the 3rd century CE, where Krishna is called "Vāsudeva," a patronymic referring to his father Vasudeva Anakadundubhi. The early Krishna is described in the Mahabharata as the chief of the Yadavas kingdom of Dvārakā (modern Dwarka in Gujarat).

To this day, a group of religious mendicants known as Vasudevs are people believed to be incarnation of Krishna.

"The Vasudevs, the village mendicants, also live on the alms they get from the villagers. The religious cult from which this art form originated was that of Vasudev-Krishna which was in existence in the fourth century B.C. It gained popularity only after the first century B.C., and in subsequent centuries it was absorbed into the wider religious framework of Vaisnavism"

— Narayana Menon

=== Amalgation into Vaishnavism ===
The cult of Krishna-Vāsudeva ultimately merged with various traditions such as Bhagavatism, the cult of Gopala-Krishna and the cult of Bala-Krishna, to form the basis of the current tradition of monotheistic religion of Krishna:

"Present day Krishna worship is an amalgam of various elements. According to historical testimonies Krishna-Vāsudeva worship already flourished in and around Mathura several centuries before Christ. A second important element is the cult of Krishna Govinda. Still later is the worship of Bala-Krishna, the Divine Child Krishna – a quite prominent feature of modern Krishnaism. The last element seems to have been Krishna Gopijanavallabha, Krishna the lover of the Gopis, among whom Radha occupies a special position. In some books Krishna is presented as the founder and first teacher of the Bhagavata religion."

— Klaus Klostermaier, A Survey of Hinduism

Over centuries, the cult of Vāsudeva transformed into Vaishnavism.

From the 4–5th century, Vāsudeva-Krsna is identified with Vishnu and Narayana, and fuses with Gopala-Krishna:

In the Kavyas of Kalidasa we find not only Vāsudeva-Krsna identified with Vishnu and Narayana, but Krsna is also called Gopala-Krsna. He has obtained the Kaustubha jewel from the serpent Kaliya of the Jamuna, "wears the peacock feathers resembling the cloud adorned with rainbow", and his wife is Rukmini and his brother Balarama.

— Radhakamal Mukerjee

The fused religious movement of Vāsudeva-Krishna became a major component of the amalgamated worship of Krishna, who was incorporated into Vaishnavism as the 8th incarnation of Vishnu. According to the Vaishnava doctrine of the avatars, Vishnu takes various forms to rescue the world, with Vāsudeva-Krishna understood as one of the most popular ones.

The association of Vāsudeva-Krishna with Narayana (Vishnu) is confirmed by the Hathibada Ghosundi Inscriptions of the 1st century BCE. It is generally thought that "by the beginning of the Christian era, the cult of Vāsudeva, Vishnu and Narayana amalgamated". By the 2nd century CE, the "avatara concept was in its infancy", and the depiction of the four emanations of Vishnu (the Chatur-vyūha), consisting in the Vrishni heroes including Vāsudeva and minus Samba, starts to become visible in the art of Mathura at the end of the Kushan period.

The Harivamsa describes intricate relationships between Krishna Vāsudeva, Sankarsana, Pradyumna and Aniruddha that would later form a Vaishnava concept of primary quadrupled expansion, or chatur vyuha.

Vāsudeva is also associated with the qualities of gentleness and strength.

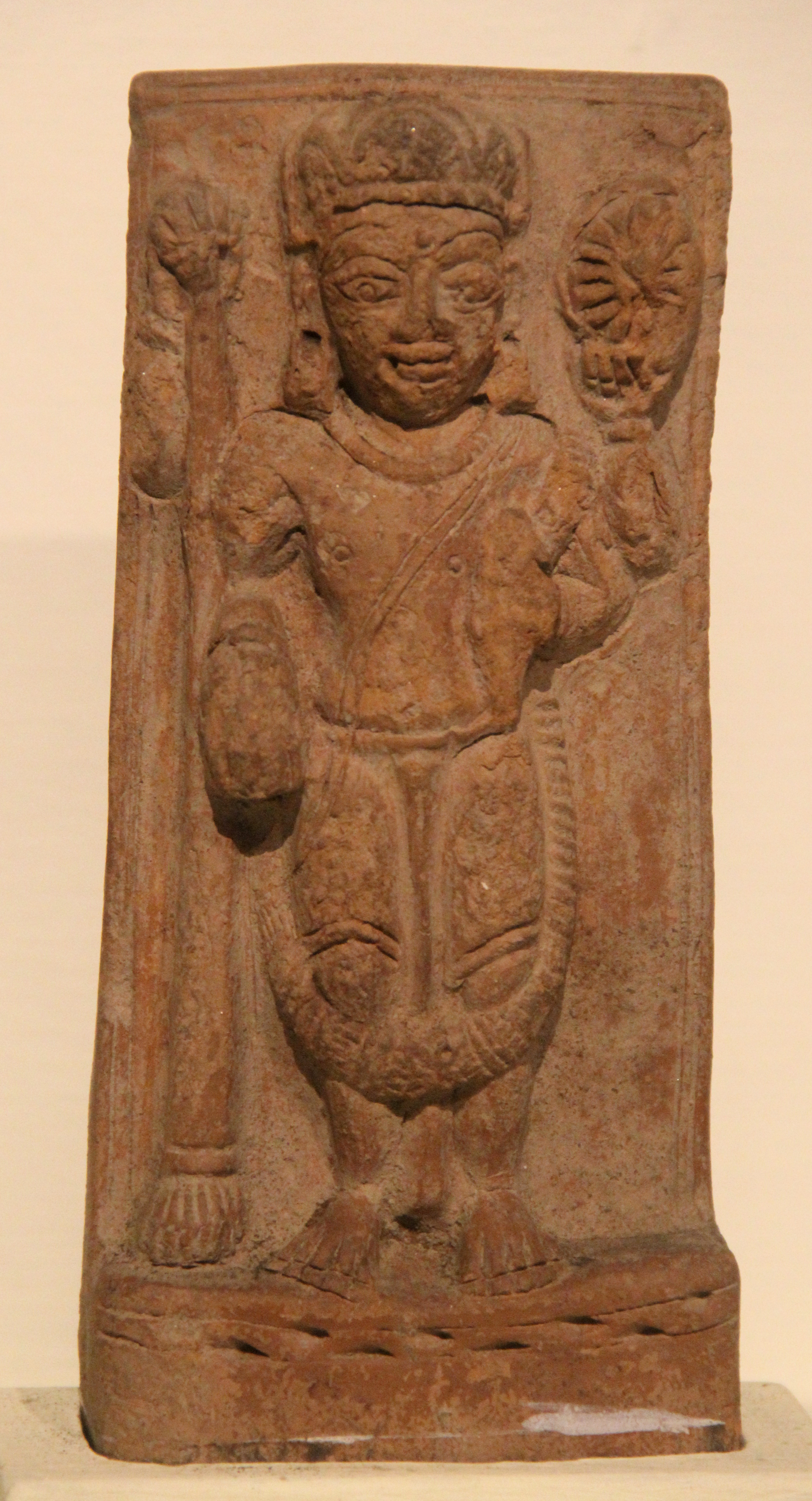
Vāsudeva with four attributes and without an aureole, terracotta

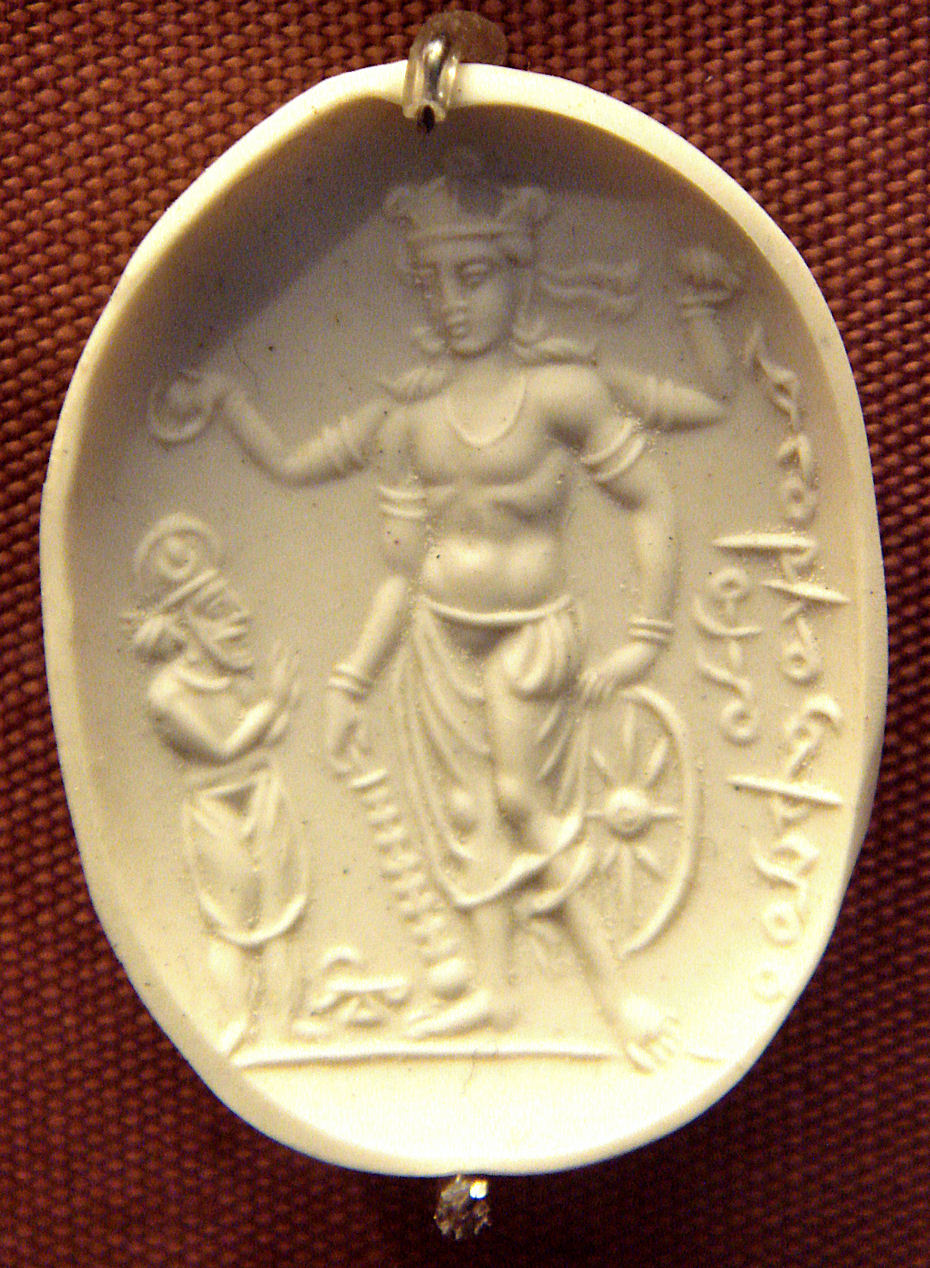
The Vishnu Nicolo Seal, 4th century CE, Gandhara, may depict Vāsudeva holding the gada club, the chakra discus, the wheel and the lotus, rather than Vishnu. (Note: "A much better known «syncretistic» image is the one depicted on a well-known «nicolo» seal (....) Ghirshman thought of a composite deity (Mihira-Visnu-Siva, Ibidem: 55-58), although an identification with the god Vāsudeva is perhaps more likely (Mitterwallner 1986: 10)")

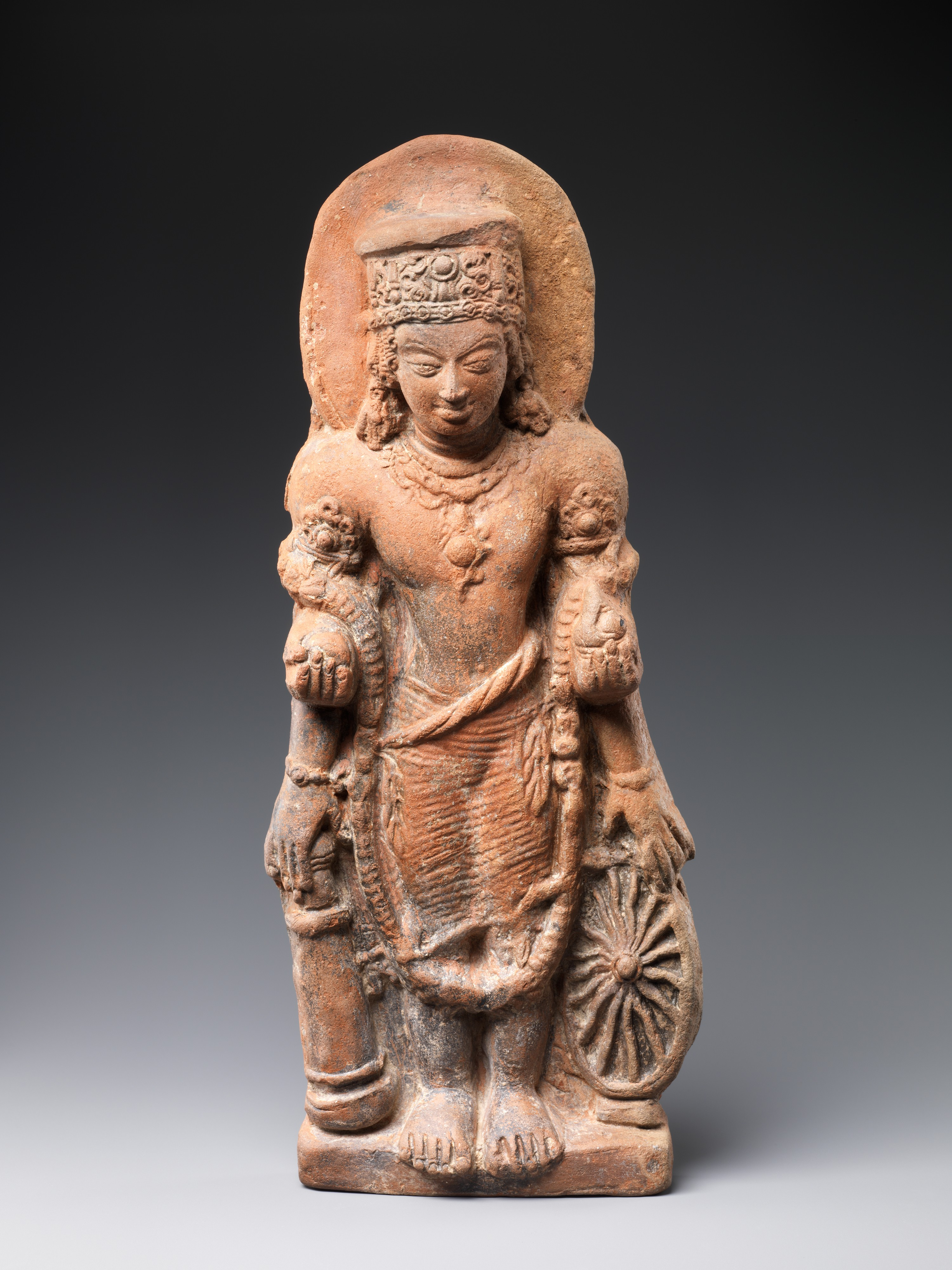
A statue of Vishnu Caturanana ("Four-Armed"), using the attributes of Vāsudeva, with the addition of an aureole around the head (5th century CE)

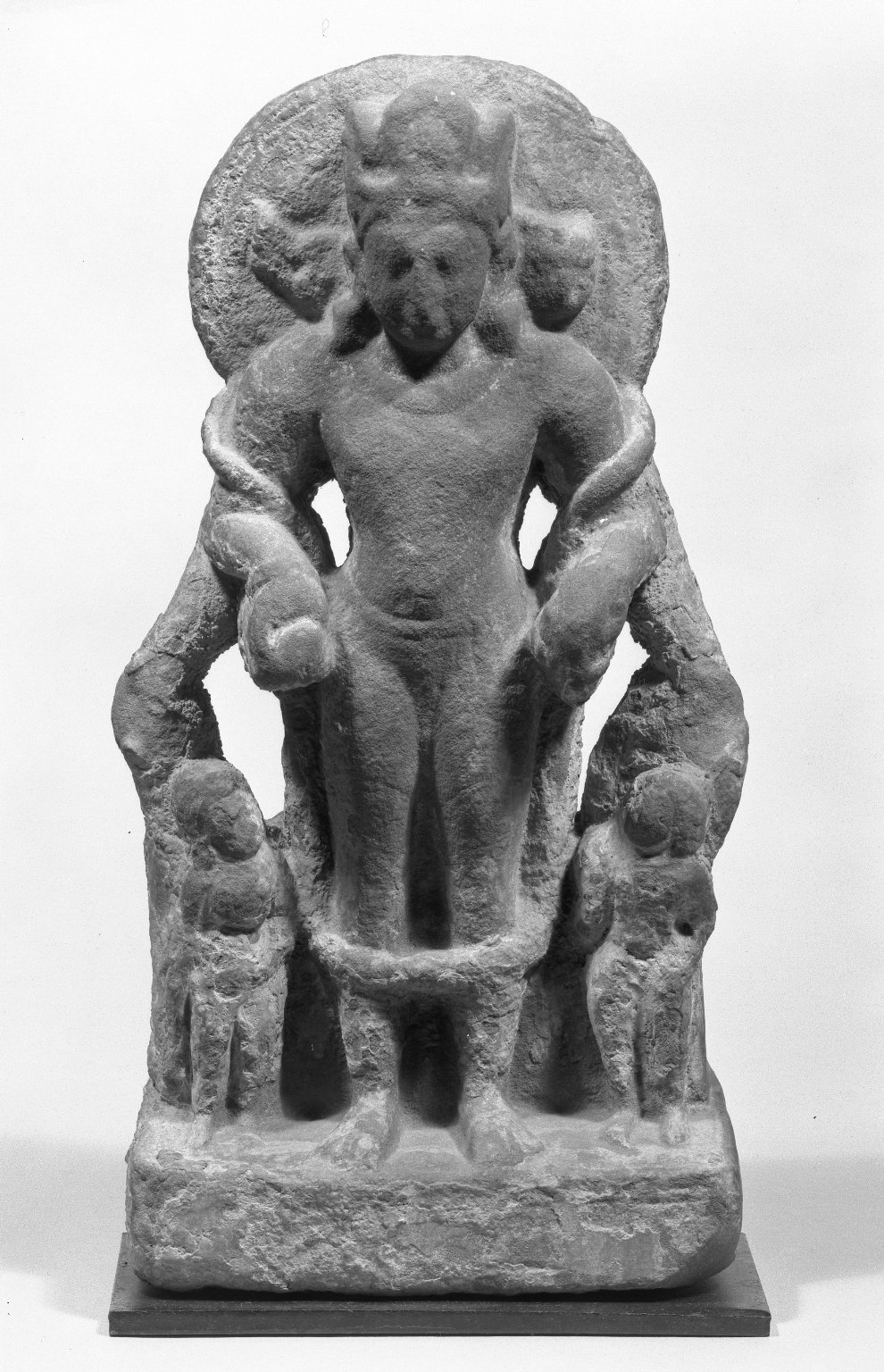
Four-faced four-armed Vishnu Vaikuntha Chaturmurti, still showing Vāsudeva Krishna as the central human figure, 4th–5th century, Mathura

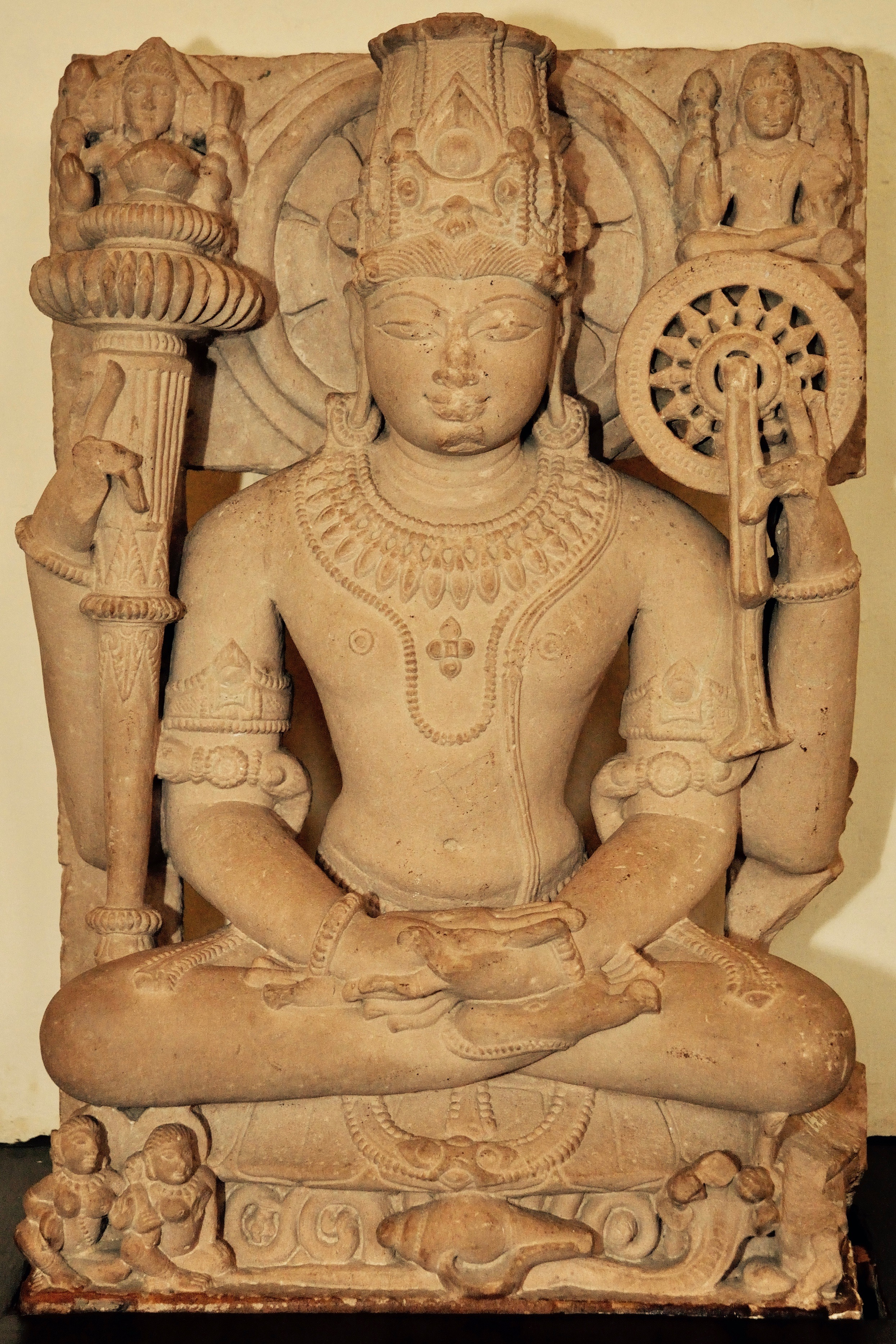
Four-armed Seated Vishnu (with the aureole) in meditation, Medieval Period

=== Iconographic transition ===
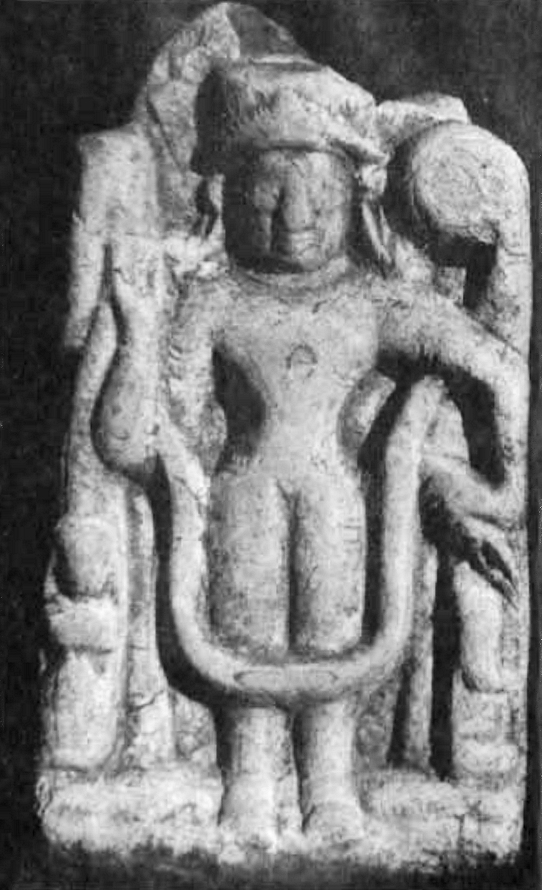
Type of statuette now reattributed to Vāsudeva, with three attributes, hand in abhaya mudra and without an aureole, 3rd–4th century.

Various early statues showing a deity with the attributes of Vāsudeva have long been attributed to Vishnu. But it is now thought that statues dedicated to the worship of Vishnu only started to appear from the 4th century CE during the Gupta Empire period, derived from, and using the attributes of Vāsudeva, but adding an aureole starting at the shoulders: the Vishnu Caturbhuja ("Four-Armed Vishnu") statues. The statues before the 4th century CE have been reattributed to Vāsudeva, a period during which Vāsudeva seems to have been much more important than Vishnu.

Other statues of Vishnu show him as three-headed (with an implied fourth head in the back), the Visnu Vaikuntha Chaturmurti or Chaturvyuha ("Four-Emanations") type, where Vishnu has a human head, flanked by the muzzle of a boar (his avatar Varaha) and the head of a lion (his avatar Narasimha), two of his most important and ancient avatars, laid out upon his aureole. Recent scholarship considers that these "Vishnu" statues still show the emanation Vāsudeva Krishna as the central human-shaped deity, rather than the Supreme God Vishnu himself.

== Devotion ==
A popular short prayer for worshipping Vāsudeva is Dvadasakshari ("the twelve-syllable mantra"), consisting in the recitation of the phrase "Om Namo Bhagavate Vāsudevāya" (in devanagari: ॐ नमो भगवते वासुदेवाय), which is one of the most popular Hindu mantras, and one of the most important mantras in Vaishnavism. It means "Om, I bow to Lord Vāsudeva", who is variously understood as Krishna or Vishnu.

== Epigraphy and sculptures ==
=== Vāsudeva ===
==== Identification with Herakles (3rd c. BCE) ====
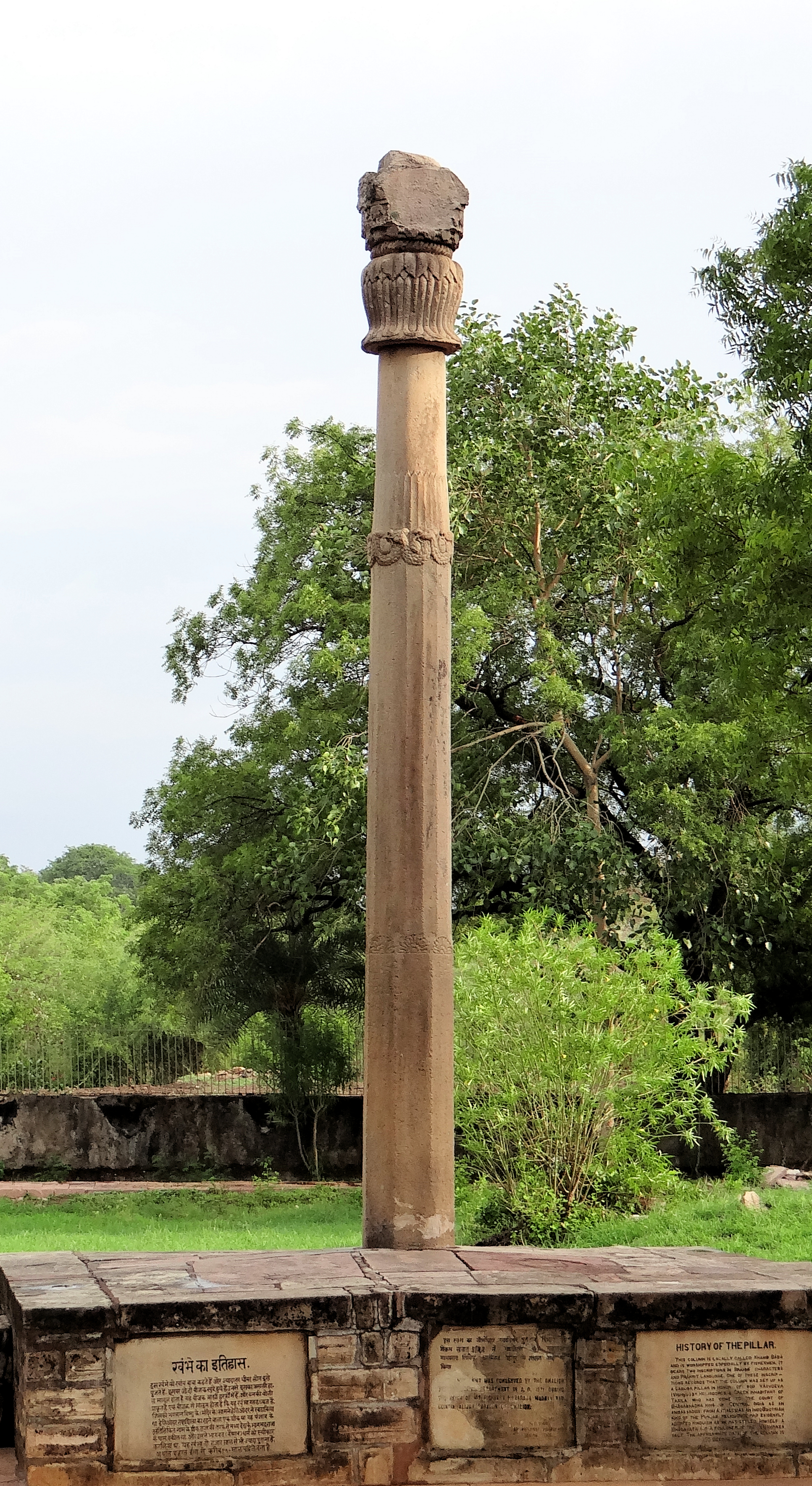
The Heliodorus pillar established in Vidisha in the name of Vāsudeva

Arrian in his work Indica (2nd c. CE), quotes the earlier work of the same name by Megasthenes (3rd c. BCE) which claims that Herakles, son of Zeus had come to India and was honoured by the locals as an 'indigenous' Indian deity. This reference is understood to be to Vāsudeva.

But Heracles, whom tradition states to have arrived as far as India, was called by the Indians themselves 'Indigenous.' This Heracles was chiefly honoured by the Surasenians, an Indian tribe, among whom are two great cities, Methora and Cleisobora, and the navigable river Iobares flows through their territory.

— Para VIII, Arrian's Indica

However Arrian himself does not consider the stories about Herakles credible, stating:

If anyone believes this, at least it must be some other Heracles, not he of Thebes, but either of Tyre or of Egypt, or some great king of the higher inhabited country near India.

— Para V, ibid

It has been proposed that Megasthenes misheard the words "Hari-Krishna" as "Herakles". According to Upinder Singh, "Vāsudeva-Krishna was the Indian God bearing the closest resemblance to the Greek God Herakles."

==== Heliodorus pillar and Temple of Vāsudeva (circa 115 BCE) ====
Temple of Vāsudeva

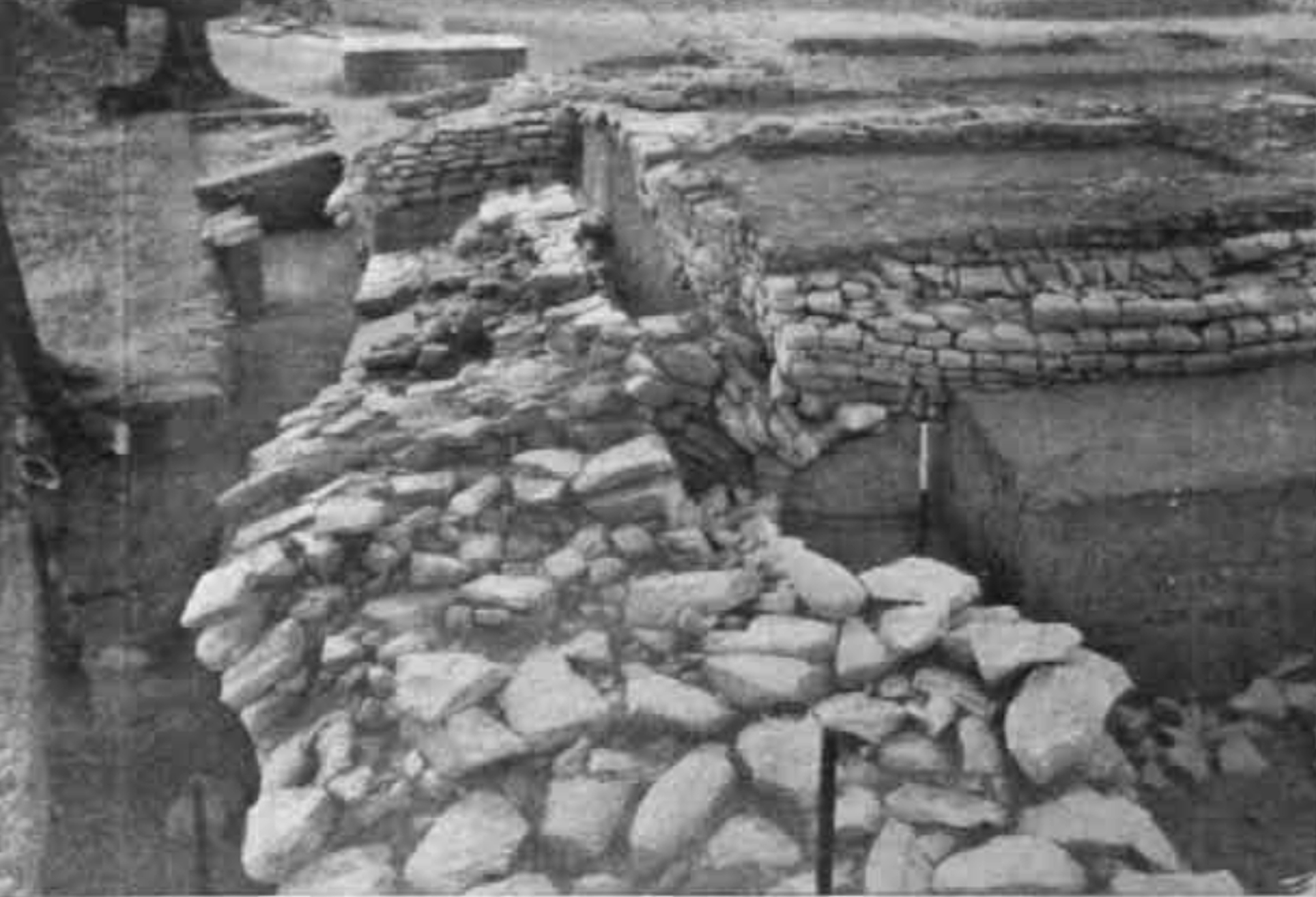
Initial excavations

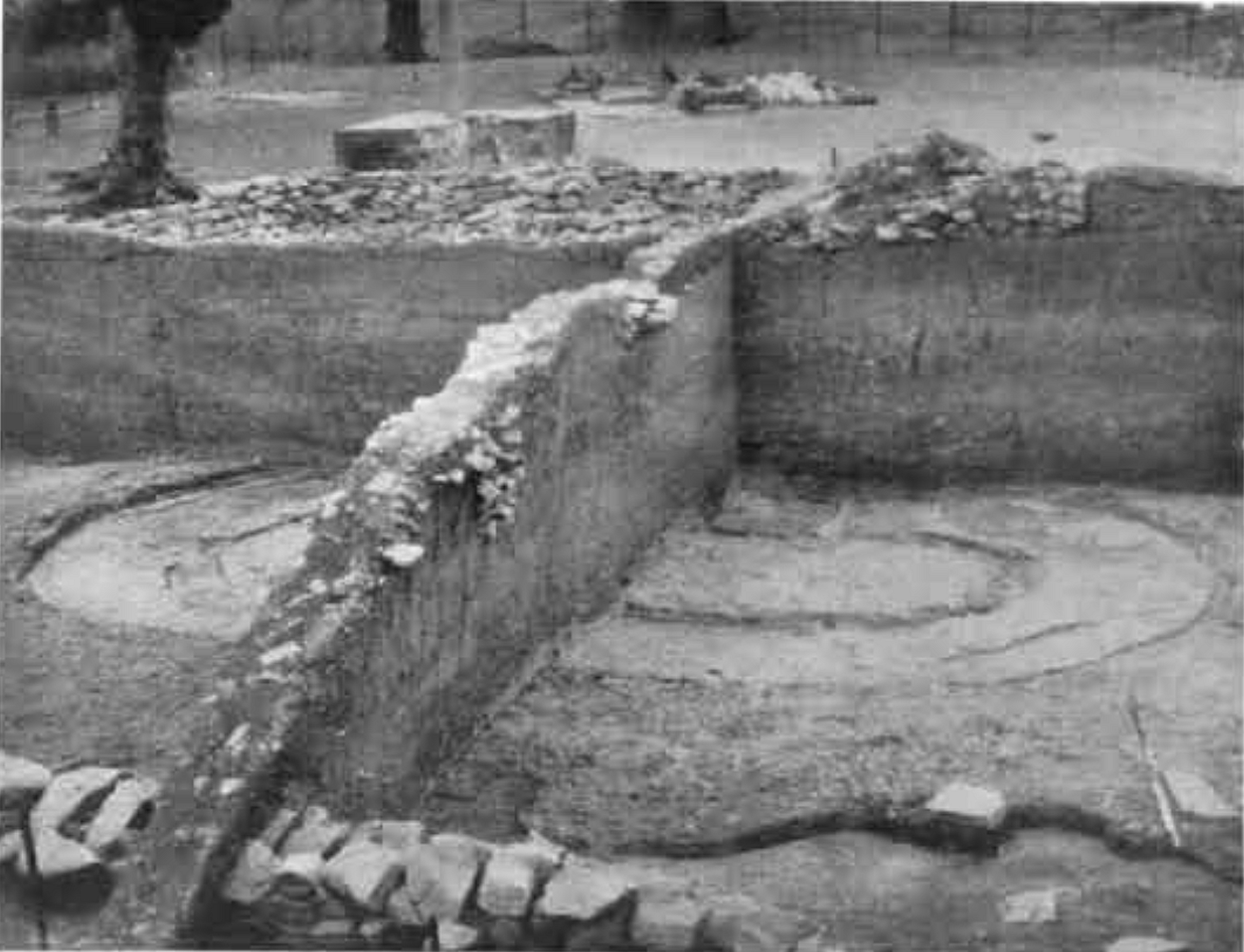
Elliptic plan of the Temple

Excavation of the huge Temple of Vāsudeva next to the Heliodorus pillar, dated to the 2nd century BCE, Vidisha. The Temple measured 30x30 meters, and the walls were 2.4 meters thick. An earlier and smaller elliptic temple structure underneath probably dates to the end of the 3rd century BCE.

The cult of Vāsudeva soon extended well beyond the area of Mathura, as shown by the Heliodorus pillar, established by an Indo-Greek ambassador to the court of an Indian king in Vidisha, in the name of Vāsudeva.

This pillar, offered by the Greek ambassador and devotee Heliodorus, also shows that Vāsudeva even received dedications from the Indo-Greeks, who also represented him on the coinage of Agathocles of Bactria (190–180 BCE). The Heliodorus pillar, joining earth, space and heaven, is thought to symbolize the "cosmic axis" and express the cosmic totality of the Deity. Next to the pillar, a large Temple of Vāsudeva was discovered, where he was celebrated together with his deified kinsmen, the Vrishni heroes.

In the Heliodorus pillar, Vāsudeva is described as Deva deva, the "God of Gods", the Supreme Deity. According to Harry Falk, making dedications to foreign gods was a logical practice for the Greeks, in order to appropriate their power: "Venerating Vāsudeva, as did Heliodor in the time of Antialkidas, should not be regarded as a "conversion" to Hinduism, but rather as the result of a search for the most helpful local powers, upholding own traditions in a foreign garb."

A large temple, probably dedicated to Vāsudeva or the Vrishni heroes, was also discovered next to the Heliodorus pillar at Vidisha. The Temple measured 30x30 meters, and the walls were 2.4 meters thick. Pottery finds confirmed that the Temple dated to the 2nd century BCE. An earlier and smaller elliptic temple structure underneath probably dates to the end of the 3rd century BCE.

==== Vāsudeva Temple in Mathura (1st c. CE) ====
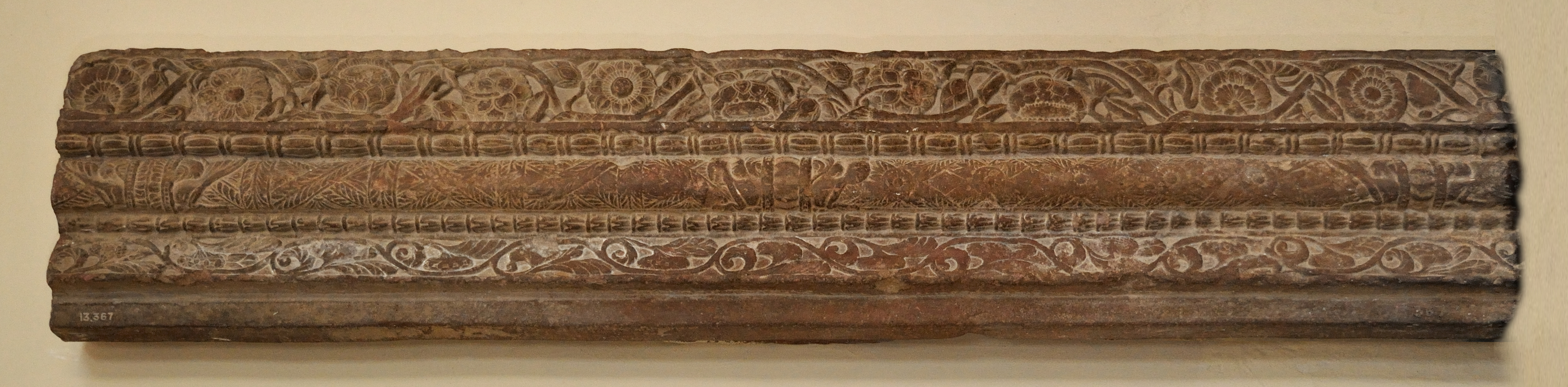
The Vasu doorjamb, dedicated to Vāsudeva, "in the reign of Sodasa", Mathura, c. 15 CE. Mathura Museum, GMM 13.367.

The Vasu Doorjamb Inscription is a significant early Sanskrit inscription from Mathura. The mention of Sodasa's time who, states Salomon, is "dated with reasonable certainty to the early early years of the first century AD". Its mention of Vasu, temple, Vedika and a torana (gateway) is significant as it confirms that the large temple building tradition was in vogue in the Mathura region by at least the start of the common era. Further, it also attests to the popularity of the Vāsudeva tradition in this period. The Vasu Doorjamb inscription of Sodasa in Uttar Pradesh viewed with other epigraphical evidence such as the Besnagar Heliodorus pillar in Madhya Pradesh, the Hathibada Ghosundi Inscriptions in Rajasthan, and the Naneghat inscriptions in Maharashtra suggest that the cult of Vāsudeva had spread over a wide region by the 1st-century BCE to the start of common era.

According to Quintanilla, the Vasu Doorjamb and the inscription is "one of the most important and most beautiful objects" from the time of Sodasa, likely from a "temple to Vāsudeva". The carvings on the doorjamb are three woven compositions. It has a leafy vine that runs along the length of the red sandstone jamb. Along the stem of the vine are curling leaves and blossoms, that wrap along as those found in nature, a rosette added in where the intertwining vines meet. The wider band has lotus rhizome carved in, with subtle naturalistic variations, wherein the lotus flowers are shown in all their stages of bloom, states Quintanilla.

=== Fusion into Vaishnavism ===
==== Naneghat inscription (1st century BCE) ====
The Naneghat inscription, dated to the 1st century BCE, mentions both Samkarshana and Vāsudeva, along with the Vedic deities of Indra, Chandra, and the four Lokapala guardians Yama, Varuna and Kubera and Vāsava. This provided the link between Vedic tradition and the Vaishnava tradition. Given it is inscribed in stone and dated to 1st-century BCE, it also linked the religious thought in the post-Vedic centuries in late 1st millennium BCE with those found in the unreliable highly variant texts such as the Puranas dated to later half of the 1st millennium CE. The inscription is a reliable historical record, providing a name and floruit to the Satavahana dynasty.

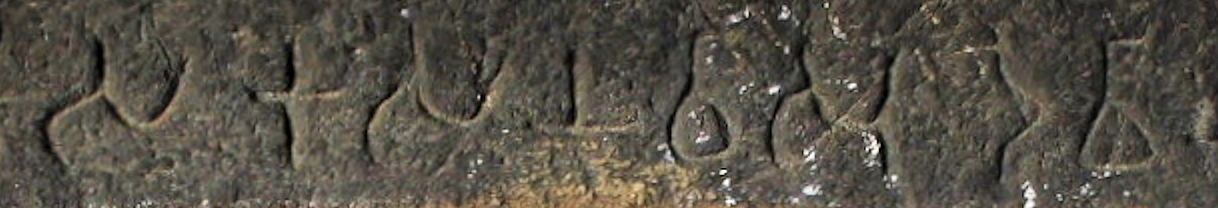
Samkarshana (𑀲𑀁𑀓𑀲𑀦) and Vāsudevā (𑀯𑀸𑀲𑀼𑀤𑁂𑀯𑀸) in the Naneghat cave inscription

The first dedicatory sentence in the inscription reads:

sidhaṃ ... no dhaṃmasa namo īdasa namo saṃkaṃsana-vāsudevānaṃ caṃda-sūtānaṃ mahimāvatānaṃ catuṃnaṃ caṃ lokapālānaṃ yama-varuna-kubera-vāsavānaṃ namo kumāravarasa vedisirisa raño

Praise (Sidham) to Dharma, adoration to Indra, adoration to Samkarshana and Vāsudeva the descendants of the Moon ("Chandra") endowed with majesty, and to the four guardians of the world ("Lokapalas"), Yama, Varuna, Kubera and Vasava; praise to Vedisri, the best of royal princes ("kumara")!

— First line of the Naneghat inscription

==== Gosundi inscription ====
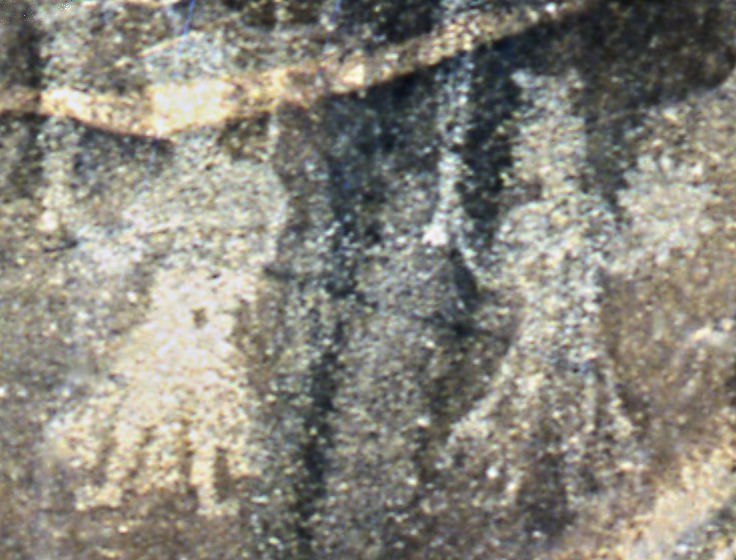
(Bala)rama and Krishna with their attributes at Chilas. The Kharoshthi inscription nearby reads Rama [kri]ṣa. 1st century CE.

Vāsudeva and Samkarshana are also mentioned in the 1st century BCE Hathibada Ghosundi Inscriptions:

(This) enclosing wall round the stone (object) of worship, called Narayana-vatika (Compound) for the divinities Samkarshana-Vāsudeva who are unconquered and are lords of all (has been caused to be made) by (the king) Sarvatata, a Gajayana and son of (a lady) of the Parasaragotra, who is a devotee of Bhagavat (Vishnu) and has performed an Asvamedha sacrifice.

– Ghosundi Hathibada Inscriptions, 1st-century BCE

==== Chilas petroglyphs ====
At Chilas II archeological site dated to the first half of 1st-century CE in northwest Pakistan, near the Afghanistan border, are engraved two males along with many Buddhist images nearby. The larger of the two males holds a plough and club in his two hands. The artwork also has an inscription with it in Kharosthi script, which has been deciphered by scholars as Rama-Krsna, and interpreted as an ancient depiction of the two brothers Balarama and Krishna.

==== Vāsudeva in 2nd century CE sculpture - ermegence of the avatar-concept ====
Vāsudeva in the Caturvyūha

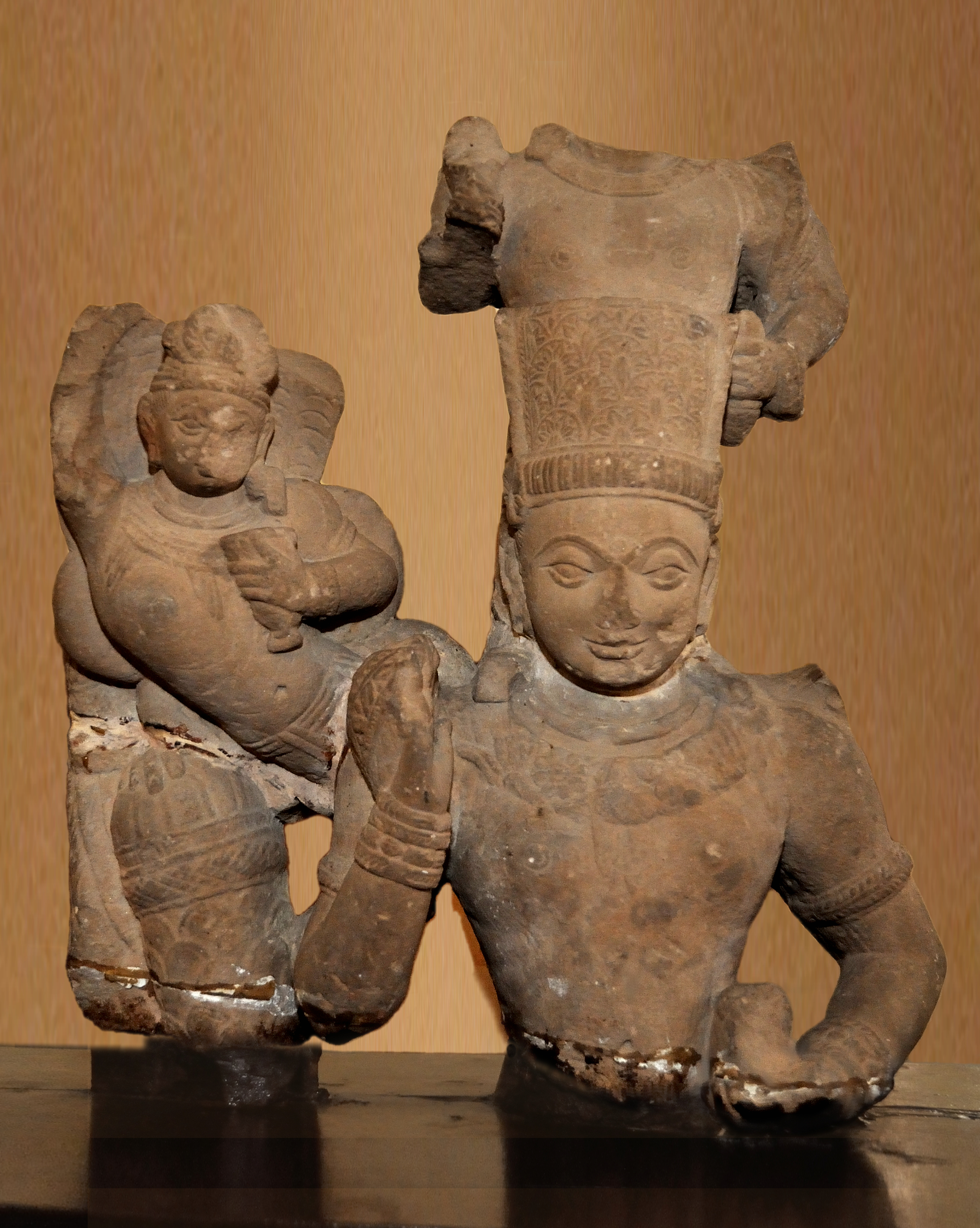
The "Four emanations"

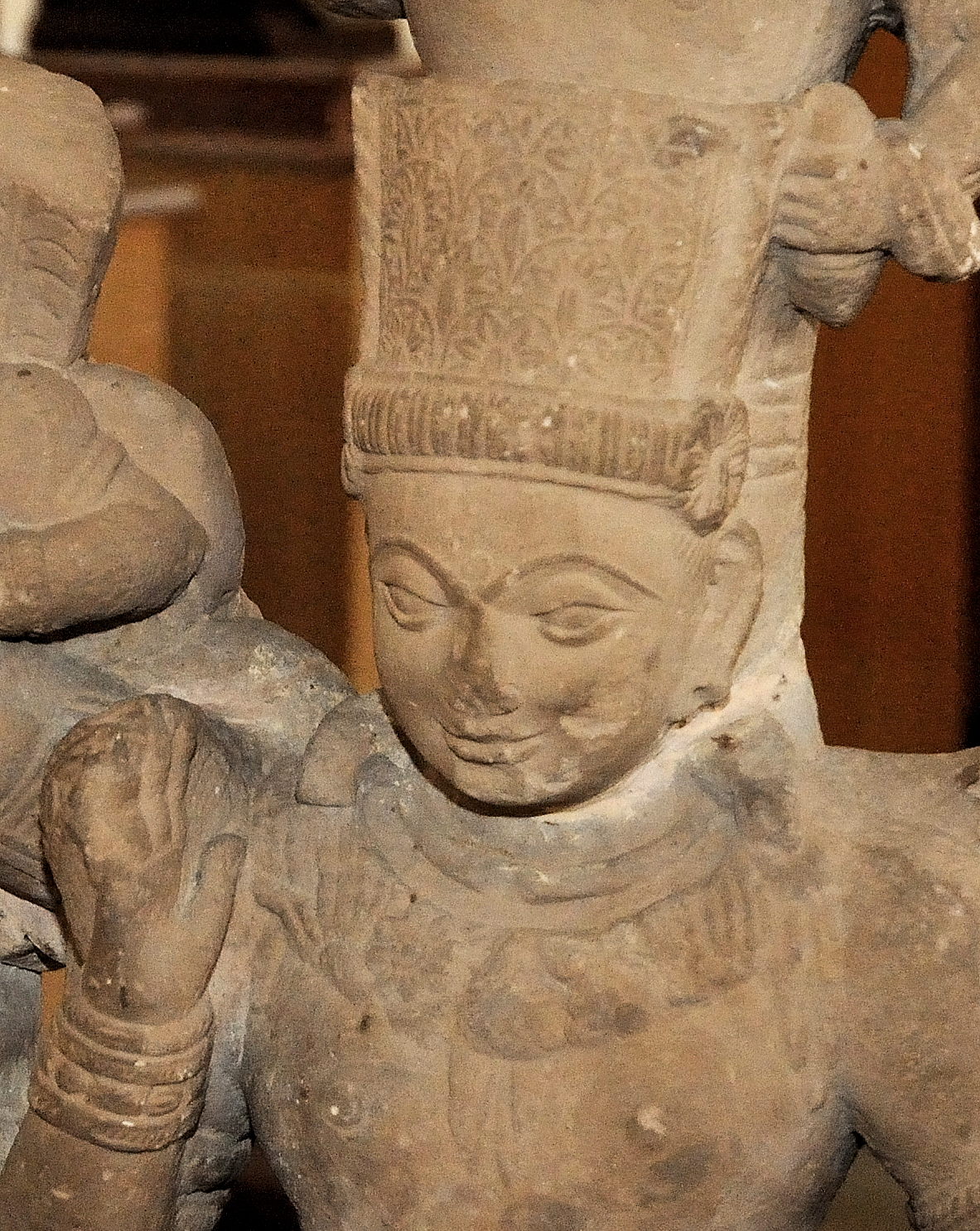
Detail of Vāsudeva

The Caturvyūha ("Four emanations"): Vāsudeva and other members of the Vrishni clan. Vāsudeva (avatar of Vishnu) is four-armed and is fittingly in the center with his heavy decorated mace on the side and holding a conch, his elder brother Balarama to his right under a serpent hood, his son Pradyumna to his left (lost), and his grandson Aniruddha on top. 2nd century CE, Mathura Museum.

Some sculptures during this period suggest that the concept of the avatars was starting to emerge, as images of "Chatur-vyūha" (the four emanations of Vishnu) are appearing. The famous "Caturvyūha Viṣṇu" statue in Mathura Museum is an attempt to show in one composition Vāsudeva (avatar of Vishnu) together with the other members of the Vrishni clan of the Pancharatra system: Samkarsana, Pradyumna and Aniruddha, with Samba missing, Vāsudeva being the central deity from whom the others emanate. The back of the relief is carved with the branches of a Kadamba tree, symbolically showing the relationship being the different deities. The depiction of Vishnu was stylistically derived from the type of the ornate Bodhisattvas, with rich jewelry and ornate headdress.

Two Kushan Empire emperors were named after Vāsudeva: Vāsudeva I (191–232 CE) and Vāsudeva II (275–300 CE).

==== Vāsudeva in the Kondamotu relief (4th century CE) ====
Vāsudeva appears prominently in a relief from Kondamotu, Guntur district in Andhra Pradesh, dating to the 4th century CE, which shows the Vrishni heroes standing in genealogical order around Narasimha. Vāsudeva follows Saṃkarṣaṇa, being second from the left in the place of seniority, with a hand in abhaya mudra and the other hand on the hip holding a conch shell. Vāsudeva also has a crown, which distinguishes him from the others. Then follow Pradyumna, holding a bow and an arrow, Samba, holding a wine goblet, and Aniruddha, holding a sword and a shield. The fact that they stand around Narasimha suggests a fusion of the Satvata cult with the Vrishni cult at this point.

Vāsudeva in the Kondamotu relief (4th century CE)

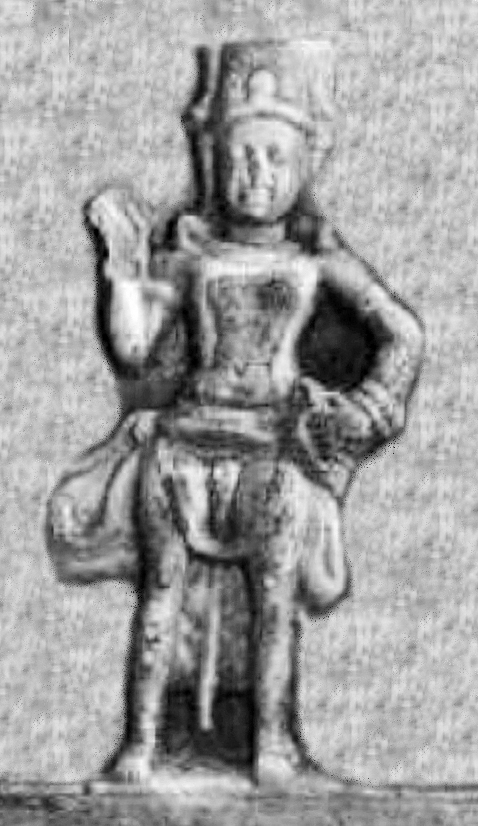
Vāsudeva

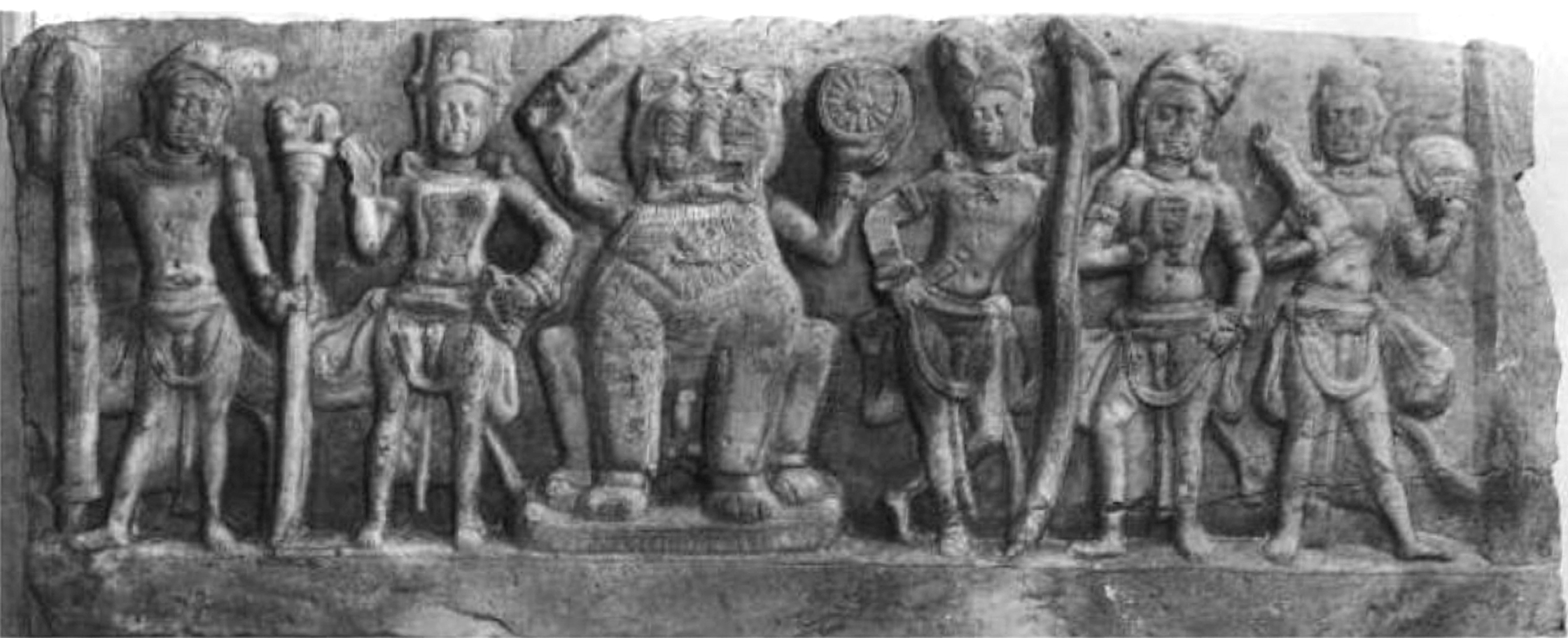
Kondamotu Vrishni heroes relief, 4th century CE, Hyderabad State Museum. Vāsudeva is second from the left.

==== Vāsudeva at Deogarh (6th century CE) ====
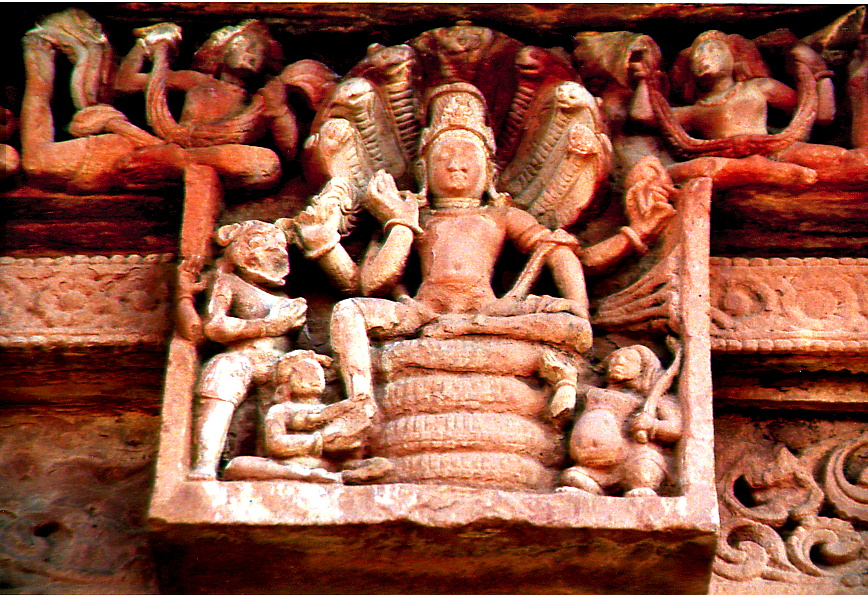
A depiction of Vāsudeva at Deogarh. He holds the wheel, the conch and salutes in Abhaya Mudra.

The Dashavatara Temple in Deogarh is closely related to the iconic architectural temple structure described in the Viṣṇudharmottara purāṇa, and can be interpreted as an architectural representation of the Caturvyuha concept and the Pancaratra doctrine, centering on the depictions of the four main emanations of Vishnu: Vāsudeva, Samkarshana, Pradyumna and Aniruddha. According to Lubotsky, it is likely that the entrance is dedicated to the Vāsudeva aspect of Vishnu; the Anantashayana side is his role as the creator (Aniruddha); the sage form of Nara-Narayana side symbolizes his preservation and maintainer role in cosmic existence (Pradyumna); and the Gajendramoksha side represents his role as the destroyer (Samkarsana).

== See also ==
- Radha Krishna
- Para Vasudeva
- Krishna in the Mahābhārata
- Bhagavad Gita
- Bhagavata Purana
- Historicity of the Mahabharata

== Sources ==
- Allchin, Raymond (1978). The Archaeology of Afghanistan from earliest times to the Timurid period. London; New York : Academic Press. ISBN 978-0-12-050440-4.
- Allen, Charles (2017). "Satavahanas and Roman gold". Coromandel: A Personal History of South India. Little Brown. ISBN 978-1-4087-0539-1.
- Austin, Christopher (2018). Diana Dimitrova and Tatiana Oranskaia (ed.). Divinizing in South Asian Traditions. Taylor & Francis. ISBN 978-1-351-12360-0.
- Austin, Christopher R. (2019). Pradyumna: Lover, Magician, and Son of the Avatara. Oxford University Press. ISBN 978-0-19-005411-3.
- Bopearachchi, Osmund (2016). Emergence of Viṣṇu and Śiva Images in India: Numismatic and Sculptural Evidence.
- Chanda, Ramaprasad (1920). Archaeology and Vaishnava Tradition in MASI, No. 5. Archaeological Survey of India. OCLC 715446015.
- Curta, Florin; Holt, Andrew (2016). Great Events in Religion: An Encyclopedia of Pivotal Events in Religious History [3 volumes]. ABC-CLIO. ISBN 978-1-61069-566-4.
- Eliade, Mircea; Adams, Charles J. (1987). The Encyclopedia of religion. Macmillan. p. 168. ISBN 978-0-02-909880-6.
- Flood, Gavin D. (1996). An Introduction to Hinduism. Cambridge University Press. ISBN 978-0-521-43878-0.
- Hastings, James Rodney (2003) [1908–26]. Encyclopedia of Religion and Ethics. Vol. 4. John A Selbie (2nd ed.). Edinburgh: Kessinger Publishing, LLC. ISBN 0-7661-3673-6.
- van Kooij, Karel Rijk (1986). "The concept of cosmic totality in the ancient art of India". In Kippenberg, Hans G. (ed.). Approaches to iconology. Visible religion: Annual for religious iconography. Vol. 4. Leiden: Brill. pp. 37–49. doi:10.1163/9789004668638_005. ISBN 978-90-04-07772-0. ISSN 0169-5606.
- Malpan, Varghese (1992). A Comparative Study of the Bhagavad-gītā and the Spiritual Exercises of Saint Ignatius of Loyola on the Process of Spiritual Liberation. Gregorian Biblical BookShop. ISBN 978-88-7652-648-0.
- Mirashi, Vasudev Vishnu (1981). "The history of the Sātavāhanas and the Western Kshatrapas: Religious condition". The history and inscriptions of the Sātavāhanas and the Western Kshatrapas. Bombay: Maharashtra State Board for Literature and Culture. pp. [131]-[149]. OCLC 24461407. ARK ark:/13960/s2qdzrhw1th.
- Paul, Pran Gopal; Paul, Debjani (1989). "Brahmanical Imagery in the Kuṣāṇa Art of Mathurā: Tradition and Innovations". East and West. 39 (1/4): 111–143. ISSN 0012-8376. JSTOR 29756891.
- Puskás, Ildikó (1990). "Magasthenes and the "Indian Gods" Herakles and Dionysos". Mediterranean Studies. 2: 43. ISSN 1074-164X. JSTOR 41163978.
- Quintanilla, Sonya Rhie (2007). History of Early Stone Sculpture at Mathura: ca. 150 BCE - 100 CE. BRILL Academic. ISBN 978-90-04-15537-4.
- Raychaudhuri, Hemchandra (1972) [1923]. Political History of Ancient India. Calcutta: University of Calcutta.
- Rosenfield, John M. (1967). The Dynastic Arts of the Kushans. University of California Press.
- Salomon, Richard (1998). Indian Epigraphy: A Guide to the Study of Inscriptions in Sanskrit, Prakrit, and the other Indo-Aryan Languages. Oxford University Press. ISBN 978-0-19-535666-3.
- Schmid, Charlotte (1997). "Les Vaikuṇṭha gupta de Mathura: Viṣṇu ou Kṛṣṇa?". Arts Asiatiques. 52: 60–88. doi:10.3406/arasi.1997.1401.
- Sharma, Ramesh Chandra (1994). The Splendour of Mathurā Art and Museum. DK Printworld. ISBN 978-81-246-0015-3.
- Singh, Upinder (2008). A History of Ancient and Early Medieval India: From the Stone Age to the 12th Century. Pearson Education India. ISBN 978-81-317-1120-0.
- Smagur, Emilia (2015). "Vaishnavite Influences in the Kushan Coinage". Notae Numismaticae- Zapiski Numizmatyczne. X.
- Srinivasan, Doris (1979). "Early Vaiṣṇava Imagery: Caturvyūha and Variant Forms". Archives of Asian Art. 32: 39–54. JSTOR 20111096.
- Srinivasan, Doris (1997). Many Heads, Arms, and Eyes: Origin, Meaning, and Form of Multiplicity in Indian Art. BRILL. ISBN 978-90-04-10758-8.
- Williams, Joanna Gottfried (1981). Kalādarśana: American Studies in the Art of India. BRILL. ISBN 978-90-04-06498-0.
