= Para-Vasudeva =

Supreme form of Krishna-Vishnu

Para-Vasudeva (Sanskrit: परवासुदेव, romanized: Paravāsudēva) is a term found in the Vaishnavism tradition of Hinduism. It refers to the supreme and transcendental form of God, from which all of his manifestations emerge. The shakti (divine energy) of this form of God is regarded to contribute to the avataras, the material appearances of the deity on earth.

== Description ==
The four vyuhas (emanations) of Vasudeva are regarded to have emerged from Para-Vasudeva, identified with Vishnu, of which Vāsudeva is described to possess the full measure of the six gunas (qualities) of jnana, aishvarya, shakti, bala, virya, and tejas, while Samkarshana, Pradyumna, and Aniruddha possessed only two of these qualities in turn. In the Puranic tradition, Vāsudeva is identified with Krishna, Samkarshana with Balarama, Pradyumna with the son of Krishna from his chief consort Rukmini, and Aniruddha as the son of Pradyumna.

Para-Vasudeva is described to will his consort, Sri-Lakshmi, in her aspects of bhuti (being) and kriya (doing) to produce the six qualities, which become the basis of all creation.

In the Gaudiya, the Vallabha, and the Nimbarka traditions, Para-Vasudeva refers to Krishna, the Svayam Bhagavan, the absolute representation of God. In the Sri tradition, the term refers to Vishnu.

== Literature ==
In the Bhagavata Purana, Krishna is described to be the Para-Vasudeva:

vāsudeva-parā vedā
vāsudeva-parā makhāḥ
vāsudeva-parā yogā
vāsudeva-parāḥ kriyāḥ
vāsudeva-paraṁ jñānaṁ
vāsudeva-paraṁ tapaḥ
vāsudeva-paro dharmo
vāsudeva-parā gatiḥ
In the revealed scriptures, the ultimate object of knowledge is Krishna, the Supreme God. The purpose of performing sacrifice is to please him. Yoga is for realising him. All fruitive activities are ultimately rewarded by only him. He is supreme knowledge, and all severe austerities are performed to know him. Religion is rendering loving service unto him. He is the supreme goal of life.

— Verse 1.2.28-29

== See also ==
- Mahavishnu
- Para Brahman
- Parameshvara
