= Bhandarkar =

Bhandarkar is common Konkani and Marathi surname. It can be found in the states of Karnataka, Kerala, Goa in India. Notable people with the surname include:

- D. R. Bhandarkar (1875–1950), Indian archaeologist and epigraphist
- Madhur Bhandarkar, Indian film director
- Ramakrishna Gopal Bhandarkar (1837–1925), social worker, Indologist

== See also ==
- Bhandarkar Oriental Research Institute
